= Ronnie Barker filmography =

2 Ronnie Barker was an English comedian who appeared in many films, radio and television shows, and advertisements.

"I have to tell you that all through my fifty years in the business, two words have always been in my thoughts – these two words are 'What luck'. What luck to have met, in the far-off days of weekly rep, a marvellous comedian called Glenn Melvyn, who gave me my first TV job and taught me how to stutter. What luck to have been in Oxford rep when a young Peter Hall arrived as director and brought me to London's West End. What luck that James Gilbert saw me do a radio show and put me in The Frost Report. What luck that the star of that show, David Frost, put me under contract, that resulted in Porridge and Open All Hours, and who paired me with the wonderful Ronnie Corbett. What luck to have had a wife for forty-five years, who throughout my television career, sat in the audience of every show and laughed louder than anyone else. And finally, standing here before you, with this most honoured award bestowed upon me by you, what luck, what wonderful luck, to be flanked on either side by my two best friends, Ronnie Corbett and David Jason. And I might cry, Gwyneth Paltrow, watch out."

— Excerpt from Barker's speech at Ronnie Barker: A BAFTA Tribute Corbett said the speech was "the first time there truly was no mask. Ronnie Barker spoke as himself, truthfully, simply and from the heart."

== Films ==
| Year | Film | Role | Notes |
|---|---|---|---|
| 1958 | Wonderful Things! | Head waiter | Uncredited |
| 1962 | Kill or Cure | Burton | |
| 1963 | The Cracksman | Yossle | |
| 1963 | Doctor in Distress | Man at railway station ticket counter | Uncredited |
| 1964 | Father Came Too! | Josh | |
| 1964 | The Bargee | Ronnie | |
| 1964 | A Home of Your Own | Cement mixer | |
| 1965 | Runaway Railway | Mr. Galore | |
| 1967 | The Man Outside | George Venaxas | |
| 1968 | A Ghost of a Chance | Mr. Prendergast | (Children's Film Foundation) |
| 1969 | Two Off the Cuff | | Voice |
| 1970 | Futtock's End | Sir Giles Futtock | |
| 1971 | The Magnificent Seven Deadly Sins | Unnamed character | (segment "Sloth") |
| 1976 | Robin and Marian | Friar Tuck | |
| 1979 | Porridge | Norman Stanley Fletcher | |
| 1982 | The Funny Side of Christmas | Albert Arkwright | |
| 1999 | The Comedy Trail: A Shaggy Dog Story | Albert Arkwright | |

== Television ==
| Year | Show | Role | Notes |
|---|---|---|---|
| 1956 | I'm Not Bothered | Bit Part | 2 episodes |
| 1960 | The Terrible Choice | 2nd Murderer | Episode 1.7: "Macbeth: Part 2" |
| 1960–1964 | It's a Square World | Various characters | 2 episodes |
| 1961 | Citizen James | Unknown | Episode: "Insurance" |
| 1961–1963 | Faces of Jim | Various characters | Series 1 named The Seven Faces of Jim; Series 2 named Six More Faces of Jim; Series 3 named More Faces of Jim; Barker appeared in several episodes in Series 1 and 2 and all six of Series 3 |
| 1962 | Benny Hill | Chef | Episode: "A Pair of Socks" |
| 1962 | The Rag Trade | Mr Goodwin | Episode: The Bank Manager |
| 1962 | ITV Play of the Week | Bundles | Episode: "The Second Chef" |
| 1962 | Drama 61-67 | Harrison | Episode: "The Frightened Sky" |
| 1962 | ITV Television Playhouse | Pickle's O'Toole | Episode: "The Pinkness of It All" |
| 1962, 1972 | Christmas Night with the Stars | Various Characters | 2 episodes |
| 1963 | BBC Sunday-Night Play | Henry Wallace | Episode: "The Holly Road Rig" |
| 1964 | How to be an Alien | Various voice roles | 6 episodes |
| 1964 | Sykes and A... | Tramp | Episode: "Sykes and a Log Cabin" |
| 1964 | Bold as Brass | Mr. Oakroyd | 4 episodes |
| 1965 | Armchair Theatre | Unknown | Episode: "The Keys of the Cafe" |
| 1965 | The Walrus and the Carpenter | Unknown | Episode: "Luther and the Golden Fleece" |
| 1965 | A Tale of Two Cities | Jerry Cruncher | 7 episodes |
| 1965 | Gaslight Theatre | Various characters | 6 episodes |
| 1965 | Theatre 625 | Crowther Rimington | Episode: "Portraits from the North: Bruno" |
| 1965 | Barney Is My Darling | | Episode: "The 2000 Pounds a Year Man" |
| 1966 | Foreign Affairs | Grischa Petrovich | |
| 1966 | The Saint | Alphonse | Episode 5.9: "The Better Mousetrap" |
| 1966–1967 | The Frost Report | Various characters | 28 episodes |
| 1967 | The Gamblers | Unknown | Episode: "The Glory of Llewellyn Smiley" |
| 1967 | The Avengers | Edwin Cheshire | Episode: "The Hidden Tiger" |
| 1967 | Before the Fringe | Various characters | 6 episodes |
| 1968 | The Ronnie Barker Playhouse | Various characters | 6 episodes |
| 1969 | The Coward Revue | | TV movie |
| 1969–1970 | Frost on Sunday | Various characters | |
| 1969–1970 | Hark at Barker | Lord Rustless | 15 episodes |
| 1969, 1971, 1975 | Play of the Month | Stephen Spettigue; Bottom; Henry Ormonroyd | Episode 5.2: "Charley's Aunt"; Episode 7.1: "A Midsummer Night's Dream"; Episode 11.4: "When We Are Married" |
| 1970 | Futtock's End | Sir Giles Futtock | TV film |
| 1970 | Not Only... But Also | Poets Cornered segment | Episode 3.5 |
| 1970 | 'Wiltons' – The Handsomest Hall in Town | Music Hall Performer | |
| 1971 | Six Dates with Barker | Various characters | 6 episodes |
| 1971 | The Ronnie Barker Yearbook | Various characters | |
| 1971 | Ronnie Corbett in Bed | Various characters | |
| 1971–1987 | The Two Ronnies | Various characters | 93 episodes |
| 1972 | His Lordship Entertains | Lord Rustless | 7 episodes |
| 1972 | Comedy Playhouse | George Idle/Johnnie Wetherby | 2 episodes |
| 1973 | Seven of One | Various characters | 7 separate pilots |
| 1974–1977 | Porridge | Norman Stanley Fletcher | 20 episodes |
| 1976 | The Picnic | The General | TV film |
| 1976–1985 | Open All Hours | Arkwright | 26 episodes |
| 1978 | Going Straight | Norman Stanley Fletcher | 6 episodes |
| 1979, 1988 | The Two Ronnies in Australia | Various characters | |
| 1980 | Rubbish Tips | Director of Rubbish | Short |
| 1982 | By the Sea | The General | TV film |
| 1984 | The Magnificent Evans | Plantagenet Evans | 6 episodes |
| 1988 | Clarence | Clarence Sale | 6 episodes |
| 1999 | The Nearly Complete and Utter History of Everything | Renaissance Man | |
| 2002 | The Gathering Storm | David Inches | TV film |
| 2003 | My House in Umbria | The General | TV film |
| 2003 | Life Beyond the Box: Norman Stanley Fletcher | Norman Stanley Fletcher | Mockumentary |
| 2005 | The Two Ronnies Sketchbook | Various characters | 7 episodes |

== Radio ==
| Year | Show | Role | Notes |
|---|---|---|---|
| 1956 | Floggit's | Lord Russett | |
| 1959–67 | The Navy Lark | Voiced 40 characters including Able Seaman (Fatso) Johnson, Lt.Cmdr (Archibald) Stanton, Lt. Queeg and a dimwitted member of Naval Intelligence and was in every episode up to November 1967 after which he left to concentrate on television | |
| 1963 | The TV Lark | Fatso | One series |
| 1963 | Crowther's Crowd | | One episode |
| 1964 | One Night of Jim | | Pilot episode appearing in the first series of Comedy Parade |
| | Variety Playhouse | Various Characters | Two episodes |
| 1971–1972 | Lines from My Grandfather's Forehead | Various Characters | Two series and Christmas special |
| 1973 | Frank Muir Goes Into | Himself | One episode |
| | Funny That Way | Himself | One episode |
| 1995 | The Comediennes | Himself | Betty Marsden |
| 1997 | The Monkhouse Archive | Himself | One episode |
| 2000 | The Hislop Vote | Himself | One episode |
| 2004 | Kington's Anatomy of Comedy | Himself | One episode |

== Self ==
| Year | Show | Notes |
|---|---|---|
| 1968 | One More with Felix | Episode 1.9 |
| 1968 | Tickertape | Episode 1.1 |
| 1968 | The Corbett Follies | Episode 1.8 |
| 1969 | The David Frost Show | Episode 1.3 |
| 1970 | It's Tommy Cooper | Episode 1.9 |
| 1970–77 | This Is Your Life | Four episodes |
| 1971 | The Harry Secombe Show | Episode 2.7 |
| 1973 | It's Lulu | Episode 3.10 |
| 1974 | Blue Peter | One episode |
| 1975, 1981 | Parkinson | Two episodes |
| 1976 | Festival of Entertainment | TV movie |
| 1978 | Looks Familiar | Episode dated 10 January 1978 |
| 1978 | BBC News | One episode |
| 1980 | The Big Show | One episode |
| 1983 | Wogan | Episode 2.1 |
| 1983 | The Bob Monkhouse Show | Episode 1.2 |
| 1983 | Children in Need | The fourth telethon |
| 1996 | Auntie's All-Time Greats | TV movie |
| 1997 | An Audience with Ronnie Corbett | TV movie |
| 1997 | Whatever Happened to... Clement and La Frenais? | TV series |
| 1999 | What a Performance! | Drag |
| 1999 | Two Ronnies Night | TV movie |
| 1999 | The Comedy Trail | TV movie |
| 2000 | The Unforgettable Richard Beckinsale | TV movie |
| 2000 | Funny Turns | Episode: "Richard Briers: A Good Life" |
| 2000 | A Tribute to the Two Ronnies | TV movie |
| 2000 | Night of a Thousand Shows | TV movie |
| 2000–2002 | Heroes of Comedy | Episode:" Ronnie Barker and Ronnie Corbett" |
| 2001 | Ronnie Barker Interview | Short |
| 2001 | The Sketch Show Story | Episode 1.2 |
| 2003 | Best of Barker | Three intros |
| 2003 | The BAFTA TV Awards 2003 | TV movie |
| 2003 | Comedy Connections | Episode: "Porridge" |
| 2003 | I'm Dreaming of a TV Christmas | TV movie |
| 2003 | Ronnie Barker: A BAFTA Tribute | TV movie |
| 2004 | Britain's Best Sitcom | Episode: "Porridge" |
| 2004 | Great Comedy Moments Introduction | Intro |

== Advertisements ==
| Year | Advert for | Notes |
|---|---|---|
| 1978 | Sekonda | Three adverts |
| 1978 | Hovis | One advert |
| 1979 | British Leyland | Two adverts |
| 1985 | Walkers Crisps | One advert |
| 1988 | Alpen | One advert |
| 1999 | Pizza Hut | One advert |
| 2003 | Marks and Spencer | One advert |

== Sources ==
- Corbett, Ronnie; Nobbs, David (2007) [2006]. And It's Goodnight From Him ...: The Autobiography of the Two Ronnies (Paperback ed.). Penguin. ISBN 978-0-14-102804-0.
- McCabe, Bob (2005) [1998]. The Authorized Biography of Ronnie Barker (Paperback edition) (4th ed.). BBC Books. ISBN 0-563-52246-1.
