= The Picnic (1976 film) =

- Created by: Dave Huggett; Larry Keith
- Starring: Ronnie Barker; Ronnie Corbett; Barbara New; Madge Hindle; Julie Crosthwait; Patricia Brake; Toby Page; Dennis Ramsden; Derek Ware
- Country of origin: United Kingdom
- Original language: English

Production
- Running time: 28 minutes
- Production company: BBC

Original release
- Network: BBC Two
- Release: 1 January 1976

Related
- Futtocks End (1970); The Two Ronnies (1971–1987); The Two Ronnies Present – By the Sea (1982); The Two Ronnies Sketchbook (2005); The One Ronnie (2010)

The Picnic (full title The Two Ronnies Present - The Picnic), is a 1976 BBC television film starring The Two Ronnies, and written by Ronnie Barker under the pseudonyms "Dave Huggett and Larry Keith".

== Introduction ==
The film followed the extended family of "The General", played by Barker, as they went on an eventful picnic in the Devon countryside. The film is notable for being completely free of speech, with the score by Ronnie Hazlehurst and various sound effects in their place. The humour is instead entirely visual, and relies on comic stereotypes (the old randy general, the busty girl, etc.) It had a sequel, By the Sea, featuring some of the same characters made in 1982. The 28-minute film was shown on BBC 2 on 1 January 1976, but has rarely been repeated, although in recent times it has been shown several times by ITV3, who currently hold the rights to the Two Ronnies library. A limited VHS release of By The Sea and The Picnic was available in 1990 and deleted in 1994. The Picnic and By The Sea, were both released on DVD on 24 September 2012 as part of The Two Ronnies: Complete Collection. . A standalone Australian individual release of both silent shorts was released on Region 4 DVD on 10 June 2015, titled: The Two Ronnies: The Picnic and By the Sea.
