= Barbara New =

British actress (1923–2010)

- Born: Barbara Helene New; 9 May 1923; Hammersmith, London, England
- Died: 24 May 2010 (aged 87); Paddington, London, England
- Occupation: Actress
- Spouse: Michael Barrington (m. 1956; died 1988)

Barbara Helene Barrington (9 May 1923 – 24 May 2010) better known by her stage and birth maiden name Barbara New was an English character actress, well known for playing Mabel the scullery maid in the David Croft sitcom You Rang, M'Lord?. Following this role, she appeared as Vera Plumtree in all twenty episodes of the BBC's final David Croft sitcom Oh, Doctor Beeching!. She had previously played smaller parts in Croft's sitcoms Dad's Army and Hi-de-Hi!.

New had a lengthy acting career, mainly in British television and played many other roles including appearances in Z-Cars, Emu's Broadcasting Company, Ripping Yarns and the silent Ronnie Barker comedy By the Sea. One of her last screen appearances was as Ali G's Nan in the 2002 film Ali G Indahouse.

New also appeared in television adverts for Vicks over a twenty-year period, initially as a mother and later as a grandmother.

She was married to the actor Michael Barrington until his death in 1988.

== Film and television roles ==
Year	Title	Role
1958	Pride and Prejudice	Charlotte Lucas
1958	The Diary of Samuel Pepys	Queen Katherine
1958	Emergency Ward 10	Mrs Clarke
1962	Maigret	Fernande Steuvals
1962	Z-Cars	Pet
1968	...And Mother Makes Five	Mrs James
1974	The Wednesday Play	Casualty sister
1975	The Picnic	The Aunt
1975	Porridge	Home Office Visitor
1975	Within These Walls	Prisoner
1977	The Black Panther	Woman in Post Office
1977	Ripping Yarns	Jehovah's Witness / Mrs Olthwaite
1973 to 1980	The Two Ronnies	Various
1981	Happy Since I Met You	Mum
1982	By the Sea	The Aunt
1982	Witness for the Prosecution	Miss O'Brien
1984	The Bill (TV series)	Kate Ferne
1986	Bread (TV series)	May's neighbour
1988 to 1993	You Rang, M'Lord?	Mabel Wheeler
1996	Casualty	May Davies
1995 to 1997	Oh, Doctor Beeching!	Vera Plumtree
2000	Beast	Mrs Wright
2002	Ali G Indahouse	Nan
