= Michael Redfern =

English actor (1943–2022)

- Born: Michael Ian Redfern; 30 March 1943; Isleworth, Middlesex, England
- Died: 29 July 2022 (aged 79); Ontinyent, Spain
- Occupation: Actor
- Spouse: Carol Redfern

Michael Ian Redfern (30 March 1943 – 29 July 2022) was an English actor, known for his appearances on television and stage.

== Early years ==
Redfern was born on 30 March 1943 in Isleworth, Middlesex, England.

== Career ==
Redfern is perhaps best known for his role on the long-running British "Oxo family" television commercials, running from 1983 to 1999, in which he played the on-screen husband of Lynda Bellingham.

He has appeared in numerous television dramas and comedies as policemen over the years, namely The Young Detectives, Crossroads, The Offence, And Mother Makes Five, George & Mildred, Robin's Nest, The Young Ones, Filthy, Rich and Catflap, Boon and Fool's Gold: The Story of the Brink's-Mat Robbery.

His other comedy appearances include roles in Man About the House with Richard O'Sullivan, Bless This House with Sid James and Some Mothers Do 'Ave 'Em with Michael Crawford. With Ronnie Barker in Open All Hours, Porridge and The Two Ronnies 1982 Christmas Special playing the barman in the famous drink-ordering sketch. The 1980s and 1990s saw him act in episodes of Hi-de-Hi!, Never the Twain, Three Up, Two Down, Terry & June, Sorry! with Ronnie Corbett, Girls on Top, The Nineteenth Hole, Bottom and The Detectives. He appeared in several soap operas: United! (59 episodes); The Newcomers (128 episodes); EastEnders (1 episode) and Doctors (1 episode).

After the Oxo adverts, he moved with his wife Carol to Spain, where he often worked as a compere for quiz nights. He died in Ontinyent, Spain on 29 July 2022, at the age of 79.

Redfern was a supporter of Fulham FC.
