= By the Sea (1982 film) =

- Created by: Ronnie Barker (as Dave Huggett and Larry Keith)
- Starring: Ronnie Barker; Ronnie Corbett; Barbara New; Madge Hindle; Debbi Blythe
- Country of origin: United Kingdom
- Original language: English

Production
- Running time: 55 minutes
- Production company: BBC

Original release
- Network: BBC1
- Release: 12 April 1982

Related
- Futtocks End (1970); The Two Ronnies (1971–1987); The Two Ronnies Present – The Picnic (1976); The Two Ronnies Sketchbook (2005); The One Ronnie (2010)

By the Sea (full title The Two Ronnies Present – By the Sea), is a 1982 BBC television film starring The Two Ronnies, and written by Ronnie Barker under the pseudonyms "Dave Huggett and Larry Keith". It was the follow-up to another Two Ronnies film, The Picnic, which featured several of the same characters.

The film follows the extended family of "The General", played by Barker, as they go on an eventful seaside holiday. It is set on the Dorset coast in "Tiddly Cove", actually the coast between Bournemouth and Swanage. The film is completely free of speech; there are various sound effects and vocalisations, and a score by Ronnie Hazlehurst, in their place.

== Production ==
Ronnie Barker was a keen collector of saucy seaside postcards, exemplified by the work of Donald McGill, and had published several collections about them. The humour of By the Sea was very much based on the colourful style of these, being based on comic stereotypes (an old randy general, a busty girlfriend, a cheeky schoolboy, etc.).

Ronnie Corbett notes in his Autobiography of the Two Ronnies that the work may have been Barker's "most personal work of all, and I think for this reasons he had probably been a bit self-indulgent". Corbett notes that the first cut of the film assembled by Barker and an editor ran to one hour and forty minutes. Jimmy Gilbert, BBC Head of Comedy, told Barker it was far too long and commissioned producer Alan J. W. Bell, the director of Last of the Summer Wine, to improve the film.

Bell was given a budget to re-shoot scenes if required, but did not go so far as to do so; he re-structured the film and cut it down to fifty-five minutes. He commissioned Ronnie Hazlehurst to write an original music score. To add comic effect and to replicate the feel of silent films, the film was also slightly undercranked to speed it up.

== Broadcast and release ==
The film was shown on BBC1 at Easter 1982, but has rarely been repeated, although in recent times it has been shown several times by ITV3, which currently holds the rights to the Two Ronnies library. A limited VHS release of By The Sea and The Picnic was available in 1990 and discontinued in 1994. By The Sea and The Picnic were both released on DVD on 24 September 2012 as part of The Two Ronnies: The Complete Collection. A standalone Australian individual release of both silent shorts was released on Region 4 DVD on 10 June 2015, titled The Two Ronnies: The Picnic and By the Sea.
