= The Two Ronnies 1987 Christmas Special =

1987 television special

The Two Ronnies 1987 Christmas Special, also known as Christmas Night with the Two Ronnies, was first broadcast on BBC1 on Christmas Day 1987 as part of the 12th series of the show starring Ronnie Barker and Ronnie Corbett. It was their last regular television appearance as Barker decided to retire from showbiz.

Elton John was the show's musical guest, singing Candle In the Wind before its general release. The show climaxed with the Pinocchio II: Killer Doll sketch, a parody of the slasher films popular at the time; this sketch alone featured Lynda Baron (Barker's Open All Hours co-star), Sandra Dickinson, Alfred Marks, Denis Quilley, Frank Finlay and a cameo from American movie star Charlton Heston.

At the time the special aired, no one except Corbett knew about Barker's decision to retire, mostly influenced by concerns over his own health: The deaths of fellow comedians Richard Beckinsale (with whom he starred in Porridge) in 1979 and Eric Morecambe in 1984 reportedly frightened him.
