= Michael Barrington =

British actor (1924–1988)

- Born: Michael John Barrington; 3 July 1924; Twickenham, Middlesex, England
- Died: 5 June 1988 (aged 63); London, England
- Education: Birmingham School of Speech and Drama
- Occupation: Actor
- Spouse: Barbara New (m. 1956)

Michael Barrington (3 July 1924 – 5 June 1988) was a British actor best known for his television work. His best remembered role is as the ineffectual Governor Venables in the BBC sitcom Porridge which featured Ronnie Barker in the lead role.

== Early life ==
Born in Twickenham, Middlesex, he was 16 when both his parents died. Educated at Haberdashers' Aske's Boys' School, his plans to train as a veterinarian were interrupted by Second World War service in a munitions factory and the Royal Engineers.

== Career ==
Barrington decided to become an actor after the war and trained at the Birmingham School of Drama.

He then appeared in repertory theatres and at the Vaudeville Theatre in a production of Salad Days.

In addition to Porridge, Barrington also appeared in Z-Cars, The Avengers, Private Schulz, Adam Adamant Lives!, and in the Doctor Who story The Seeds of Doom, as Sir Colin Thackeray. He was cast as Sir Robert Peel in the 1975 English miniseries Edward the Seventh. (In the USA this miniseries was renamed Edward the King.)

== Personal life and death ==
He was married to character actress Barbara New from 17 March 1956 until his death from a heart attack on 5 June 1988, aged 63 in London, following many years of ill health due to lung disease. He was buried in the East London Cemetery and Crematorium.

== Selected filmography ==
- Payroll (1961) – Hay (uncredited)
- The Hellfire Club (1961) – Footman (uncredited)
- Follow That Man (1961) – Hotel manager
- Privilege (1967) – The Bishop of Essex
- Up the Junction (1968) – Barrister
- The Rise and Rise of Michael Rimmer (1970) – Major Scott
- Follow Me! (1972) – Mr. Scrampton
- The Black Panther (1977)
- The Stud (1978) – Vicar (uncredited)
