= Madge Hindle =

English actress (born 1938)

- Born: Madge Railton; 19 May 1938 (age 88); Blackburn, Lancashire, England
- Occupation: Television actress
- Years active: 1966–2003
- Notable work: Lily Tattersall in Nearest and Dearest; Renee Bradshaw in Coronation Street
- Spouse: Michael J Hindle (m. 1962)
- Children: 2, including Charlotte Hindle

Madge Hindle (born 19 May 1938) is an English retired actress, known for her roles in British television shows.

== Career ==
Hindle was born in Blackburn, Lancashire. Her break came when her friend, playwright Alan Bennett, asked her to appear in his 1966 BBC comedy series On the Margin.

From 1968 to 1973, she played the role of Lily Tattersall on the series Nearest and Dearest. When the series' director, Bill Podmore, took over as producer of Coronation Street, he thought of her when he created the role of the feisty shopkeeper, Renee Bradshaw.

Hindle joined the cast as Renee Bradshaw in 1976. In 1978, Renee was married to the character Alf Roberts (Bryan Mosley). However, in 1980, Renee was killed when her car was struck by a lorry. Hindle remains philosophical about her character's death in Coronation Street, saying that if they had to write her out, at least they killed her.

She appeared in two of Alan Bennett's television plays: Sunset Across the Bay (1975) and Intensive Care (1982). She worked in several productions with Ronnie Barker, playing the governor's secretary Mrs Hesketh in the BBC sitcom Porridge and made two appearances in Open All Hours, another Barker sitcom. She co-starred with Barker in The Two Ronnies' 1976 TV film The Picnic and the 1982 sequel By the Sea.

Hindle later had a recurring role in the sitcom Barbara (1999-2003).

== Personal life ==
In addition to being an actress, Hindle was Mayoress of Blackburn when her mother became Mayor.

Hindle is the Honorary Vice-President of Blackburn Arts Club, an amateur dramatic society.

She lives with her husband Michael, near Settle in North Yorkshire.
