= The One... =

British comedy sketch television show

- Created by: Matt Lucas; David Walliams; Geoff Posner
- Starring: Ronnie Corbett; Lenny Henry; Jasper Carrott; Griff Rhys Jones

Production
- Production company: Little Britain Productions

Original release
- Release: 25 December 2010 – 16 January 2012

The One... is a comedy sketch television series starring Ronnie Corbett, of The Two Ronnies, Lenny Henry of The Lenny Henry Show, Jasper Carrott, comedian and former presenter of ITV game show Golden Balls and Welsh comedian and actor Griff Rhys Jones, also presenter of ITV clip series It'll Be Alright on the Night. It was devised by Matt Lucas, David Walliams and Geoff Posner for Little Britain Productions. Walliams departed the project by the time of the full series.

The show debuted in 2010 with Corbett, to celebrate his 80th birthday. In 2011, it was confirmed that more new episodes were to be produced for broadcast in early 2012.

A full series, containing three episodes, was broadcast from 6 January 2012 to 16 January 2012. Extended 40-minute versions of the episodes were also broadcast after the original 30-minute edit was shown.

== Ronnie Corbett (2010) ==
The One Ronnie is a one-off comedy television sketch show that aired on BBC One on Christmas Day 2010 to celebrate the 80th birthday of Ronnie Corbett. It featured sketches between Corbett and Lionel Blair, Rob Brydon, James Corden, Jon Culshaw, Harry Enfield, Jocelyn Jee Esien, Miranda Hart, Robert Lindsay, Matt Lucas, Catherine Tate, David Walliams, and Richard Wilson. Charlotte Church also appeared as herself. The title was a reference to Corbett's long-running sketch show The Two Ronnies which also featured Ronnie Barker, who had died in 2005. "The One Ronnie" was released onto DVD exclusively on 24 September 2012 in The Two Ronnies Complete Collection box set as an exclusive bonus extra.

Corbett's sketch with Harry Enfield, "My Blackberry is Not Working", was a homage to the famous "Four Candles" sketch with Ronnie Barker. It soon became one of his most popular sketches.

== Lenny Henry (2012) ==
Henry appeared in 2012 for The One Lenny Henry to reprise the role of DJ, Delbert Wilkins, as well as another character, Donovan Bogarde. New sketches included a Twilight spoof and a rendition of Cee Lo Green's "Fuck You". This episode featured guest appearances Ronni Ancona, Omid Djalili and Peter Serafinowicz. A 40-minute extended edition was also aired featuring extra material.

== Jasper Carrott (2012) ==
Jasper Carrott returned to stage for the first time since 1972 for The One Jasper Carrott, with some of his most popular sketches, with special guest Robert Powell. An extended 40-minute version was aired 2 days after containing extra material.

== Griff Rhys Jones (2012) ==
The One Griff Rhys Jones was a 30-minute special containing sketches with a guest appearances by Tom Hollander and Mel Smith. This was Smith's final public appearance before his death on 19 July 2013 from a heart attack. A 40-minute extended edition was also aired featuring extra material.
