= Foreign Affairs (1966 TV series) =

- Genre: Sitcom
- Created by: Leonard Samson
- Written by: Johnnie Mortimer; Brian Cooke; Leonard Samson
- Starring: Leslie Phillips; Richard O'Sullivan; Austin Trevor; Dorothy Frere; Ronnie Barker
- Country of origin: United Kingdom
- No. of series: 1
- No. of episodes: 6

Production
- Producer: John Street
- Running time: 30 minutes

Original release
- Network: BBC1
- Release: 16 September – 21 October 1966

Foreign Affairs is a British sitcom that aired on BBC1 in 1966. Starring Leslie Phillips in the lead role, it was set in the Foreign Office in Whitehall. The entire series was wiped and is no accessible in any format.

== Background ==
All six episodes were written by writing partners Johnny Mortimer and Brian Cooke, with creator Leonard Samson also co-writing one episode. Foreign Affairs introduced the writers to young actor Richard O'Sullivan and this would lead to his title role in the 1970s sitcom Man About the House.

== Cast ==
- Leslie Phillips as Dennis Proudfoot
- Richard O'Sullivan as Taplow
- Austin Trevor as Sir Hugh Marriot
- Dorothy Frere as Miss Jessup
- Ronnie Barker as Grischa Petrovitch
- Joe Melia as Serge Volchanivov
- Sonia Graham as Irinka

== Plot ==
Womaniser Dennis Proudfoot works in the Foreign Office in Whitehall as the personal assistant to Sir Hugh Marriot, the administrator of foreign relations. The programme focuses on the conflicts between the Foreign Office and the counterparts at the Soviet Embassy in London. Serge Volchanivov is the commissar for foreign relations and his assistant is Grischa Petrovitch. Taplow is the 20-year-old post-room boy.

== Episodes ==
Foreign Affairs aired on Fridays at 7.30pm. Due to the archival policies of the time, all six episodes were subsequently wiped and no longer exist.

No.	Title	Original release date
1	"The Foreign Body"	16 September 1966
2	"Can We Have Our Ball Back?"	23 September 1966
3	"The Leak"	30 September 1966
4	"Learning to Compromise"	7 October 1966
5	"One of Our Islands is Missing"	14 October 1966
6	"The Exterminator"	21 October 1966
