= A Tale of Two Cities (1965 TV series) =

Former BBC Series

- Genre: Historical drama
- Based on: A Tale of Two Cities by Charles Dickens
- Written by: Constance Cox
- Directed by: Joan Craft
- Starring: Patrick Troughton; Kika Markham; John Wood
- Composer: Alan Rawsthorne
- Country of origin: United Kingdom
- Original language: English
- No. of series: 1
- No. of episodes: 10 (8 missing)

Production
- Producer: Campbell Logan
- Editor: Pam Bosworth
- Running time: 25 minutes
- Production company: BBC

Original release
- Network: BBC1
- Release: 11 April – 13 June 1965

A Tale of Two Cities is a British television series that first aired on BBC1 in 1965. It is an adaptation of the novel A Tale of Two Cities by Charles Dickens. Out of the 10 episodes produced, 8 are believed to be lost. Episodes 2 and 3 survive, and various promotional photographs and productions stills featuring the actors in costume are available online.

== Cast ==
- Patrick Troughton as Dr Manette
- Nicholas Pennell as Charles Darnay
- Kika Markham as Lucie Manette
- Leslie French as Jarvis Lorry
- George Selway as Defarge
- John Wood as Sydney Carton
- Rosalie Crutchley as Madame Defarge
- Ronnie Barker as Jerry Cruncher
- Alison Leggatt as Miss Pross
- George Little as Jacques Three
- Jack May as Mr Stryver
- Peter Bayliss as Barsad
- Diana King as Vengeance
- Artro Morris as Jacques Two
- Stephen Dartnell as Jacques One
- Rolf Lefebvre as Gabelle
- Ralph Nossek as Road-mender
- Darryl Read as Jerry Cruncher Jr
- Nicholas Smith as Cly
- Jerome Willis as Marquis St Evrémonde
- Janet Henfrey as Mrs Cruncher
- Bernard Kay as President of Tribunal

== Bibliography ==
- Ellen Baskin. Serials on British Television, 1950-1994. Scolar Press, 1996.
