= The Two Ronnies =

British television comedy sketch show (1971–1987)

- The spectacles logo from the show's opening. Both performers wore glasses; Barker's are on top, Corbett's underneath.
- Created by: Bill Cotton
- Starring: Ronnie Barker; Ronnie Corbett
- Country of origin: United Kingdom
- Original language: English
- No. of series: 12
- No. of episodes: 93

Production
- Running time: 40–58 minutes
- Production company: BBC

Original release
- Network: BBC1 (Note: Series 1-2 repeated on BBC-2)
- Release: 10 April 1971 – 4 November 1972
- Network: BBC2 (Note: Series 3-4 repeated on BBC-1) (Note: The Picnic first shown on BBC-2, 01/01/1976)
- Release: 27 September 1973 – 1 January 1976
- Network: BBC1
- Release: 4 September 1976 – 25 December 1987

Related
- The Two Ronnies Present – The Picnic (1976); The Two Ronnies Present – By the Sea (1982); The Two Ronnies Sketchbook (2005); The One Ronnie (2010)

The Two Ronnies is a British television comedy sketch show starring Ronnie Barker and Ronnie Corbett. It was created by Bill Cotton and aired on BBC Television from 10 April 1971 to 25 December 1987.

The usual format included sketches, solo sections, serial stories, and musical finales. Their Four Candles sketch, first broadcast on 18 September 1976, was voted their funniest sketch in a television poll. In 2006, the British public ranked the duo number 6 in ITV's poll of TV's 50 Greatest Stars.

== Origins ==
Ronnie Barker and Ronnie Corbett met in 1963 at the Buckstone Club in Haymarket, London, where Corbett was serving drinks between acting jobs. At the time, Barker was beginning to establish himself as a character actor in the West End and on radio. They were invited by David Frost to appear in his new television show, The Frost Report, with John Cleese, but the pair's big break came when they filled in, unprepared and unscripted, for eleven minutes during a technical glitch at a British Academy of Film and Television Arts awards ceremony at the London Palladium in 1971. In the audience was Bill Cotton, the Head of Light Entertainment for the BBC, and Paul Fox, the Controller of BBC1. Cotton was so impressed by the duo that he turned to Fox and asked: "How would you like those two on your network?" Unknown to the pair, the renewal of their contract had just been declined by London Weekend Television of rival network ITV, freeing them to change channels. Barker and Corbett were given their own show by the BBC.

== Production ==
=== Writing ===
The show was based on the complementary personalities of Barker and Corbett, who never became an exclusive pairing, but continued to work independently in television outside of the editions of the Two Ronnies. The show was produced annually between 1971 and 1987. It had many notable writers including Ray Alan, John Cleese, Barry Cryer, Spike Milligan, David Nobbs, David Renwick, Terry Ravenscroft, Eric Idle, John Sullivan, Michael Palin, Bryan Blackburn, Terry Jones, and Laurie Rowley. In addition, Barker used the pseudonym Gerald Wiley when writing sketches. Barker and Corbett would often structure each show themselves, alongside scriptwriters Ian Davidson and Peter Vincent.

=== Theme music ===
The main theme music for the show was composed by Ronnie Hazlehurst. Although opening and closing credits appear to use different themes, they are respectively the first and third sections of a longer piece.

Another track associated with the show is the stock track The Detectives by Alan Tew (also known as the theme to 1975 Yorkshire TV series The Hanged Man). This was used for the Charlie Farley and Piggy Malone story Stop You're Killing Me.

== Format ==
=== Newsdesk ===
The Two Ronnies always opened and closed at the newsdesk, which featured the Ronnies as newsreaders, reading spoof news items. This gave rise to the famous catchphrase at the end of each show:

Corbett: That's all we've got time for, so it's "Good night" from me.
Barker: And it's "Good night" from him.
Both: Good night!

=== Sketches ===
The show featured comic sketches in which Barker and Corbett appeared both together and separately, with various additions giving the programme the feeling of a variety show. Barker liked to parody officialdom and establishment figures, as well as eccentrics. Corbett appeared quieter, more often acting as a foil for Barker, but remained an important part of the chemistry. Some of the jokes involved Corbett's height and Barker's weight:

Barker: And now, a sketch about an enormous embarrassment at a small party. Mr. Ronnie Corbett plays the small party.
Corbett (pause): And Mr. Ronnie Barker plays the enormous embarrassment!

Other jokes could be playfully risqué, as found on seaside postcards, for example:

Man (sotto voce): Tickle your botty with a feather tonight?
Woman (outraged): I beg your pardon?
Man: Particular grotty weather tonight.

Some of the show's material contained elements of surreal or left-field humour, in the vein of Monty Python. This wasn't surprising, because in the early years of the show many sketches were written by members of the Python troupe themselves (John Cleese, Eric Idle, Michael Palin, and Terry Jones) and featured eccentric people being comically violent.

Corbett and Barker joined forces some time after their peers, by which time the comedy world had moved toward satire, absurdist surrealism, and the beginnings of alternative humour. This left the field for more traditional comedy open to Corbett and Barker, who freely indulged in puns, wordplay, misunderstandings, and ridiculous situations.

==== Notable sketches ====
- Swedish Made Simple (1974) – A Swedish waiter simplifies his customer's orders using subtitles where each word is translated to a letter. ("Have you any tea?" becomes "F. U. N. E. T.?")
- Four Candles (1976) – A hardware shopkeeper becomes increasingly frustrated while misunderstanding what a farmhand is requesting.
- Mastermind (1980) – A contestant on the quiz show Mastermind answers each question before last.
- The Sweet Shop (1980) – A sweet-shop owner whose motto is "nothing is too much trouble" has to deal with a very fussy customer.
- Crossword (1980) – On a train, a slow-witted commuter struggles aloud with his easy crossword while a serious man tries to complete his own intellectual crossword.
- Inventors' Convention (1980) – Two inventors sharing a hotel room show their invention to each other before the convention: a hair-growing lotion and an aerosol that makes invisible.
- Crossed Lines (1981) – Two men next to each other at supermarket payphones have their conversations unintentionally answering each other.
- Courtroom Quiz (1984) – Patrick Troughton plays a judge overhearing a cross-examination that takes the form of quiz-show questions.
- The Sheikh in the Grocery Store (1985) – An Arab man struggles to convey his shopping list to the vendor in a grocery store.

=== Solo sections ===
Both Barker and Corbett had their own solo sections on each show. Barker would have his own heavily wordplay-based sketch, often as the head of a ridiculous-sounding organisation (for example, the "Anti-Shoddy Goods Committee"). Likewise, Corbett always had a discursive solo monologue in each show, when he sat in a chair, facing the camera, attempting to tell a simple joke, but constantly distracting himself into relating other humorous incidents. The joke itself was normally deliberately corny; the humour came from Corbett's wild tangents, as well as the anticlimax when he finally reached the punchline.

An example of Ronnie Corbett's humour is this short excerpt from a monologue:

I was lying in bed with my wife last Sunday morning when she called me by a special pet name she has for me, a loving and endearing term that only she uses. 'Hey, Shorty' she said, 'would you like to hear the patter of little feet?' Somewhat taken aback, I replied 'Yes, I would.' She said 'Good. Run down to the kitchen and get me a glass of water.'

=== Serial stories ===
It became a tradition of the shows to have a continuing serial story which progressed through the eight episodes of a series. These were often fairly bawdy tales with special guest stars. The Two Ronnies also starred in two spin-off silent films labelled The Two Ronnies Present..., The Picnic and By the Sea, written by Barker, mainly silent comedies featuring a squabbling upper-class family with a 1920s feel about them.

==== Hampton Wick (1971) ====
The very first serial of The Two Ronnies was written by Barker, and began as a pastiche of costume dramas about a governess called Henrietta Beckett, played by Madeline Smith. Barker played a sex-starved aristocrat called Sir Geoffrey, and Corbett played his son Edward, but further into the serial, the Ronnies portrayed a wide variety of other characters, including pick-pockets and royals. At the end it is revealed to be just a dream when she wakes up in Hampton Wick Cottage Hospital after having an accident.

==== Done to Death (1972) ====
Piggy Malone (Barker) and Charley Farley (Corbett) are private detectives who investigate a mystery about a murdered family, featuring Sue Lloyd as Blanche Brimstone. As soon as Piggy finds out about the murder in the newspaper, a decision's made that means a trip to the country, and there's a second murder during an unusual gathering. Also featuring are secretary Miss Whizzer and the rest of the Brimstone family, through which the detectives narrow down the culprit. The first seven episodes of Done to Death ended with the words "Only one thing was for certain. There would be very little sleep for anyone that night."

==== Death Can Be Fatal (1975) ====
Piggy and Charley's second serial begins when a frogman delivers a note, and the duo are sent in search of the formula for the Clumsy Drug, alongside Cyd Hayman as Madame Eloise Coqoutte. Corbett and Barker also play the two villains, the notorious Mr Greensleeves and his Japanese henchman Bobjob. In the end the mystery is solved as the formula is revealed on a pair of women's knickers. The endings for Death Can Be Fatal were based on more, as Corbett put it, 'exaggerated Dick Barton lines', such as "Is this the end for our two heroes? What of Madame Cocotte? Is she in some bedroom somewhere, lying in wait with a silencer? Or lying in silence with a waiter? Find out next week in another exciting episode, Villa of Villainy."

==== The Phantom Raspberry Blower of Old London Town (1976) ====
Written by Spike Milligan and Ronnie Barker but credited as "Spike Milligan and a Gentleman" (after the fashion of 19th-century composer James Lord Pierpont, who credited himself on occasion as "a gentleman"). Set in Victorian times, it is a Jack the Ripper parody in which a mysterious figure goes around blowing raspberries at members of the upper classes. The raspberries were done by Barker's friend David Jason. This entire section of sketches was included in Milligan's book "I Told You I Was Ill".

==== Stop! You're Killing Me (1977–78) ====
Piggy and Charley return as Devon's yokels are murdered and dumped in London, with support from Kate O'Mara as the gypsy temptress, Lucy Lee.

==== Sid and Lily, George and Edie (1978-79) ====
This is not so much a serial as a series of sketches with the same characters that spanned series 7. Sid and George enjoy pints while discussing their wives Lily and Edie.

==== The Worm That Turned (1980) ====
Diana Dors guest-starred as the Commander of the State Police in this spoof piece of dystopian fiction set in 2012 in which women rule England. Male and female gender roles are completely reversed, even down to men having women's names and vice versa. Men are housekeepers and wear women's clothes, and law and order is managed by female guards in boots and hot pants. Big Ben is renamed Big Brenda, the Tower of London is renamed Barbara Castle, and the Union Jack becomes the Union Jill. The watching of chauvinistic films is prohibited, so the Two Ronnies (as Janet and Betty) prepare to escape to Wales.

==== Band of Slaves (1981–82) ====
The last serial to include Piggy Malone and Charley Farley, in which an all-girl orchestra is sold into white slavery by a demented Chinaman. Elizabeth Larner plays Mrs Bumstead, who notices a mysterious blind man appearing on the cruise ship. Location filmed on board P&O SS Canberra cruise out of Southampton. This was the last of The Two Ronnies' serials.

=== Outside performers ===
Apart from Corbett and Barker, several actors from television appeared multiple times in the series, most notably John Owens and Claire Nielson, who appeared in twenty-one and seventeen episodes respectively throughout the series. Other frequent performers include April Walker, John Rutland, Michael Redfern, Jenny Logan, Alec Bregonzi, Carol Hawkins, Dilys Watling, Joyce Windsor, Julia McKenzie, Barbara New, Ian Gray, Johnnie Wade, Patricia Brake (who starred with Barker in the sitcom Porridge, which aired at the same time as the series), Josephine Tewson (who would go on to co-star in Barker's TV series Clarence), Noel Dyson and Vicki Michelle. The Fred Tomlinson Singers appeared as background singers in twenty-five episodes. Also appearing as part of a dance group was Corbett's wife Anne.

As the series gathered more popularity, the sketches began to feature more famous and well-known British actors, including John Cleese, Patrick Troughton, Stratford Johns, Joan Sims, Patricia Routledge, Jenny Agutter, Lynda Baron (Ronnie Barker's co-star in Open All Hours) and Peter Wyngarde.

Before achieving fame in the sitcom Hi-de-Hi!, Barry Howard appeared in several early episodes as an uncredited extra. Other actors who appeared as extras before their rise to fame include Andrée Bernard and John Scott Martin.

=== Music ===
Another regular feature of the shows was an elaborate musical finale in which Barker and Corbett – sometimes with one or both in drag – and company would sing a medley of songs in character, in barbershop, music hall, Gilbert and Sullivan, George Formby, or other styles, with the original words altered to suit whatever comic situation they were portraying. Some of the finales had Barker and Corbett imitating other performers, like Charles Aznavour, Nana Mouskouri, Dolly Parton, Richard Burton and Elizabeth Taylor, and Hinge and Bracket.

In the middle of the show, there would also be a cabaret musician or group appearing as a special guest, including The Mamas & The Papas, New World, Tina Charles, Georgie Fame and Alan Price, Samantha Jones, Dana, Elkie Brooks, Manhattan Transfer, Pan's People, Michel Legrand, Barbara Dickson, the Nolan Sisters, Elton John, Marti Webb, Clodagh Rogers, Elaine Paige, and Phil Collins, the last of whom also took part in a few sketches. The programme's earliest episodes also featured specialty acts, usually in pantomime, by international vaudevillians like Chaz Chase and Jo, Jac and Joni.

== Popularity ==
The Two Ronnies became one of the most successful and long-running light entertainment shows on British television, broadcast in the prime-time slot of 8 p.m. on a Saturday night, and at its peak was watched by 18.5 million viewers a show. Following the departure of Morecambe and Wise from the BBC in 1978, The Two Ronnies became the BBC's flagship light-entertainment programme, regularly gaining the top viewing figures in the critical Christmas Day audience battle. A memorable Radio Times cover for the extended Christmas issue in 1973 had both double acts appearing side by side.

=== Spin-offs and compilation series ===
In 1986, a multi-part compilation series titled Twenty Years of the Two Ronnies was aired, which featured the pair picking some of their classic sketches. It was followed by Twenty-One Years of the Two Ronnies in 1987 and Twenty-Two Years of the Two Ronnies in 1988.

The pair made no new shows after Christmas 1987, following Barker's decision to retire from show business. This was unknown to the audience and even the production team – the only person Barker told was Corbett, and they and their wives all went for a meal straight after the recording, keeping it a very low-key affair.

=== The Two Ronnies in Australia ===
The Two Ronnies was regularly screened in Australia on ABC Television, and was repeated several times. In 1986 the series was reported as being into its second or third airing, and being broadcast in a respectable time slot.

In 1979, a series was made for the Nine Network in Australia under the title of The Two Ronnies in Australia. It was followed by another series in 1986 with six episodes. These episodes contain many of the original sketches done for the BBC, but reworked for an Australian audience.

=== Parodies ===
The show was parodied twice by the Not the Nine O'Clock News team, with Mel Smith as Barker and Griff Rhys Jones as Corbett. The first sketch was in Series 3 (1980) called "The Three Ronnies", including footage of Ronald Reagan, at the time a major (and ultimately successful) candidate in the 1980 United States Presidential Election. The second sketch was in Series 4 (1982) and controversially parodied them as "The Two Ninnies", a pastiche of their opening routine and a musical routine, using exaggerated innuendo, e.g. "Oh vagina, oh vagina, over Chinatown!" Barker in particular was particularly offended by this sketch, while Corbett was reportedly amused by it. The latter sketch was written by John Lloyd and Nigel Planer, and the writer of the song was Peter Brewis, who also wrote songs for The Two Ronnies.

The show is also briefly parodied in The Fast Show during a segment of a 'chanel 9' sketch set during a BAFTA style award ceremony. One of the nominations are 'The Twelve Ronnies', and a camera pans across a group of men dressed up to look like Corbett and Barker as they utter their famous 'it's goodbye from me' line in Chanel 9's nonsense language.

=== Adverts ===
Barker and Corbett also made a number of advertisements that appeared on ITV, including for British Leyland (Austin/Morris) in 1979 where Corbett played a villain on the run and, "needing some wheels", gets salesman Barker to show him round the Austin Morris range. They did a second ad in 1981, for the "BL Double Bonus" campaign, which featured Corbett playing a tax inspector inquiring as to why Barker is running four cars. They also did a series of ads for Hertz car rentals in the 1980s.

== Revivals and comebacks ==
The show resurfaced in 1999 for a Two Ronnies Night. Ronnie Corbett also presented a Two Ronnies at the Movies special that same year. In 2000, A Tribute to the Two Ronnies was hosted by Ronnie Barker and Ronnie Corbett themselves.

In 2004, Barker announced that he and Corbett would return to make new episodes, entitled The Two Ronnies Sketchbook. This involved the two sitting at the newsdesk introducing their classic sketches. A Christmas special was recorded in July 2005 due to Barker's failing health.

Whilst the Sketchbook series was transmitted, The Two Ronnies was also the subject of an episode of the BBC documentary Comedy Connections. Ronnie Corbett, producers James Gilbert, Terry Hughes and Michael Hurll, as well as writers Ian Davidson, Peter Vincent, David Renwick and Barry Cryer, all spoke about the making of the series. Ronnie Barker did not appear, but excerpts from an interview he gave in 1997 were included.

In 2012, full shows of The Two Ronnies were repeated on ITV3 and Gold. Over Christmas 2006, the ITV3 channel devoted three days to the show, interspersed with Ronnie Corbett's reminiscences of the show and Ronnie Barker. On 28 May 2007 many more episodes new to ITV3 were broadcast as well a showing of The Picnic and By the Sea.

== Episodes ==
=== Series 1 (1971) ===
No. overall	No. in series	Title	Produced and Directed by	Original release date
1	1	"Episode 1"	Terry Hughes	10 April 1971
Guests: Madeline Smith, Tina Charles, The Ladybirds, New World, Ian Gray, Alfredo
2	2	"Episode 2"	Terry Hughes	17 April 1971
Guests: Madeline Smith, Tina Charles, The Ladybirds, New World, Jack & Joni Jo
3	3	"Episode 3"	Terry Hughes	24 April 1971
Guests: Madeline Smith, Johnnie Wade, Tina Charles, The Ladybirds, New World
4	4	"Episode 4"	Terry Hughes	1 May 1971
Guests: Madeline Smith, Tina Charles, Joe Andy, Johnnie Wade, The Ladybirds, Josephine Tewson, New World, Toke Townley
5	5	"Episode 5"	Terry Hughes	8 May 1971
Guests: Madeline Smith, Tina Charles, The Ladybirds, Josephine Tewson, New World, Michael Ward, Gilly Flower, Ian Gray, Chaz Chase
6	6	"Episode 6"	Terry Hughes	15 May 1971
Guests: Madeline Smith, Tina Charles, The Ladybirds, New World, John Cleese, Timothy Carlton, Ian Gray, Wasta, John Cazabon
7	7	"Episode 7"	Terry Hughes	22 May 1971
Guests: Madeline Smith, Tina Charles, The Ladybirds, New World, Trio Biarge, Christopher Timothy, Ian Gray
8	8	"Episode 8"	Terry Hughes	29 May 1971
Guests: Madeline Smith, Tina Charles, The Ladybirds, New World, Cheryl Kennedy

=== Series 2 (1972) ===
No. overall	No. in series	Title	Produced and Directed by	Original release date
9	1	"Episode 1"	Terry Hughes	16 September 1972
Guests: Dilys Watling, Jerold Wells, Sally James, Sue Lloyd, Diane Keen, Georgie Fame, Alan Price, Elaine Delmar, The Fred Tomlinson Singers
10	2	"Episode 2"	Terry Hughes	23 September 1972
Guests: Sue Lloyd, Jerold Wells, Claire Nielson, Ian Gray, Georgie Fame, Alan Price, Friday Brown, The Fred Tomlinson Singers
11	3	"Episode 3"	Terry Hughes	30 September 1972
Guests: Dilys Watling, Sue Lloyd, Jerold Wells, Georgie Fame, Alan Price, Chelsea Brown, Claire Nielson, The Fred Tomlinson Singers
12	4	"Episode 4"	Terry Hughes	7 October 1972
Guests: Sue Lloyd, Jerold Wells, Georgie Fame, Alan Price, Thelma Houston, The Fred Tomlinson Singers
13	5	"Episode 5"	Terry Hughes	14 October 1972
Guests: Diane Keen, Sue Lloyd, Georgie Fame, Alan Price, Lyndsey de Paul, Joyce Windsor, John Owens, The Fred Tomlinson Singers
14	6	"Episode 6"	Terry Hughes	21 October 1972
Guests: Sue Lloyd, Jerold Wells, Mary Merrall, John Owens, Ian Gray, John Rutland, Georgie Fame, Alan Price, Elaine Delmar, The Maggie Stredder Singers, The Fred Tomlinson Singers
15	7	"Episode 7"	Terry Hughes	28 October 1972
Guests: John Moore, John Owens, Ian Gray, Georgie Fame, Alan Price, Samantha Jones, The Maggie Stredder Singers
16	8	"Episode 8"	Terry Hughes	4 November 1972
Guests: Elizabeth Counsell, Frank Middlemass, Pete Murray, Sally James, Eric Flynn, Anne Hart, John Rutland, Georgie Fame, Alan Price, Salena Jones, The Rita Povey Formation Team

=== Series 3 (1973–74) ===
No. overall	No. in series	Title	Produced and Directed by	Original release date
17	1	"Episode 1"	Terry Hughes	27 September 1973
Guests: Nicholas Courtney, Claire Nielson, April Walker, Joyce Windsor, John Rutland, Dana, Pan's People
18	2	"Episode 2"	Terry Hughes	11 October 1973
Guests: April Walker, Sally James, John Rutland, Johnnie Wade, Design, Stuart Fell, Pan's People
19	3	"Episode 3"	Terry Hughes	25 October 1973
Guests: Julia McKenzie, Dilys Watling, Harry Fielder, Albert Moses, Johnnie Wade, April Walker, Elaine Delmar, Pan's People
20	4	"Episode 4"	Terry Hughes	8 November 1973
Guests: Fiona Gaunt, April Walker, Blue Mink, Pan's People
21	5	"Episode 5"	Terry Hughes	22 November 1973
Guests: Dilys Watling, Stuart Fell, David Prowse, The New Seekers, Pan's People
22	6	"Episode 6"	Terry Hughes	6 December 1973
Guests: Noel Dyson, Claire Nielson, Sally James, Finn Jon, Jo Peters, John Scott Martin
23	7	"Episode 7"	Terry Hughes	20 December 1973
Guests: Priscilla Morgan, Julia McKenzie, April Walker, Barbara New, Arnold Diamond, Tony Orlando and Dawn, Pan's People
24	8	"Episode 8"	Terry Hughes	3 January 1974
Guests: Fiona Gaunt, Sally James, Johnnie Wade, Clodagh Rodgers, Pan's People

=== Christmas Special (1973) ===
No. overall	No. in series	Title	Produced and Directed by	Original release date
25	1	"The Two Ronnies Old Fashioned Christmas Mystery"	Terry Hughes	26 December 1973
Guests: Cheryl Kennedy, Gabrielle Drake, Barbara New, April Walker, Sally James, Barrie Gosney, John Rutland, Tux

=== Series 4 (1975) ===
No. overall	No. in series	Title	Produced and Directed by	Original release date
26	1	"Episode 1"	Terry Hughes	2 January 1975
Guests: Stratford Johns, Derek Newark, Carol Hawkins, Frank Gatliff, Alec Bregonzi, Diana King, Johnnie Wade, Stuart Fell, John Rutland, The Swingles
27	2	"Episode 2"	Terry Hughes	9 January 1975
Guests: Robin Bailey, Carol Hawkins, Jacki Piper, Michael Redfern, April Walker, The Swingles
28	3	"Episode 3"	Terry Hughes	16 January 1975
Guests: Cyd Hayman, Julia McKenzie, Barbara New, Alec Bregonzi, Claire Nielson, George Ballantine, Penny Irving, Stuart Fell, Michael Redfern, John Owens, Ian Gray, The Swingles
29	4	"Episode 4"	Terry Hughes	23 January 1975
Guests: Cyd Hayman, Noel Dyson, Arnold Diamond, Julia McKenzie, Janet Mahoney, Michel Legrand, Jo Peters, George Ballantine, John Scott Martin
30	5	"Episode 5"	Terry Hughes	30 January 1975
Guests: Cyd Hayman, Arnold Diamond, Janet Mahoney, Jo Peters, Johnnie Wade, Lesley Hand, John Owens, The Swingles, The Aldershot Brass Ensemble, John Scott Martin
31	6	"Episode 6"	Terry Hughes	6 February 1975
Guests: Cyd Hayman, Barbara New, Josephine Tewson, Lesley Hand, Joyce Windsor, Carol Hawkins, Johnnie Wade, Soraya Ravensdale, John Owens, The Swingles
32	7	"Episode 7"	Terry Hughes	13 February 1975
Guests: Cyd Hayman, Yvonne Manners, Diane Greaves, Michel Legrand, John Owens, The Swingles, The Fred Tomlinson Singers
33	8	"Episode 8"	Terry Hughes	20 February 1975
Guests: Cyd Hayman, Jacki Piper, Frederick Treves, April Walker, Michel Legrand, Claire Nielson, Caroline Whittaker, Frank Bough, Percy Thrower, The Swingles

=== Series 5 (1976) ===
No. overall	No. in series	Title	Produced and Directed by	Original release date
34	1	"Episode 1"	Terry Hughes	4 September 1976
Guests: Jo Kendall, Vicki Michelle, Claire Nielson, Johnnie Wade, John Owens, Barbara Dickson, The Fred Tomlinson Singers
35	2	"Episode 2"	Terry Hughes	11 September 1976
Guests: Julia McKenzie, Claire Nielson, Janet Webb, Johnnie Wade, Joyce Windsor, John Owens, Barbara Dickson
36	3	"Episode 3"	Terry Hughes	18 September 1976
Guests: Joan Sims, Claire Nielson, John Owens, John Rutland, John Scott Martin, Barbara Dickson
37	4	"Episode 4"	Terry Hughes	25 September 1976
Guests: Derek Deadman, Carol Hawkins, Barbara New, Moray Watson, April Walker, Barbara Dickson, Fred Tomlinson
38	5	"Episode 5"	Terry Hughes	2 October 1976
Guests: Josephine Tewson, Norman Beaton, Alec Bregonzi, Johnnie Wade, Michael Redfern, John Owens, Barbara Dickson, The Frank & Peggy Spencer Dancers
39	6	"Episode 6"	Terry Hughes	9 October 1976
Guests: Carol Hawkins, Steve Plytas, Vicki Michelle, Moray Watson, John Owens, Barbara Dickson
40	7	"Episode 7"	Terry Hughes	16 October 1976
Guests: Stephen Calcutt, Julia McKenzie, Carol Hawkins, Jenny Hanley, Claire Nielson, April Walker, John Rutland, John Scott Martin, Barbara Dickson, The Fred Tomlinson Singers
41	8	"Episode 8"	Terry Hughes	23 October 1976
Guests: Barbara Dickson, The Caledonian Highlanders, The Metropolitan Police Band

=== Series 6 (1977–78) ===
No. overall	No. in series	Title	Produced and Directed by	Original release date
42	1	"Episode 1"	Peter Whitmore	12 November 1977
Guests: Beatrice Shaw, Paul McDowell, Willie Payne, The Nolans
43	2	"Episode 2"	Peter Whitmore	19 November 1977
Guests: Claire Nielson, Michael Ripper, Rikki Howard, Sydney Bromley, Janet Webb, The Nolans, The Fred Tomlinson Singers
44	3	"Episode 3"	Peter Whitmore	3 December 1977
Guests: Kate O'Mara, Janet Webb, The Nolans
45	4	"Episode 4"	Peter Whitmore	10 December 1977
Guests: Kate O'Mara, Dilys Watling, Sydney Bromley, Janet Webb, Joyce Windsor, The Nolans
46	5	"Episode 5"	Peter Whitmore	17 December 1977
Guests: Richard Caldicot, Sydney Bromley, Janet Webb, Derek Ware, Joyce Windsor, The Nolans, The New Sensations
47	6	"Episode 6"	Peter Whitmore	26 December 1977
Guests: Kate O'Mara, Rowena Cooper, Penny Irving, The Nolans, The Aldershot Brass Ensemble
48	7	"Episode 7"	Peter Whitmore	2 January 1978
Guests: Sam Kelly, Dilys Watling, Julia Breck, David Jackson, Michael Redfern, April Walker, John Owens, The Nolans
49	8	"Episode 8"	Peter Whitmore	9 January 1978
Guests: Michael Sharvell-Martin, Rowena Cooper, Vicki Michelle, Roberta Tovey, Michael Redfern, Rusty Goffe, The Nolans, The Finchettes

=== Series 7 (1978–79) ===
No. overall	No. in series	Title	Produced and Directed by	Original release date
50	1	"Episode 1"	Brian Penders	26 December 1978
Guests: Carol Hawkins, Julia Breck, Rikki Howard, Roberta Tovey, The Manhattan Transfer
51	2	"Episode 2"	Brian Penders	1 January 1979
Guests: Jacqui Randell, John Owens, The Manhattan Transfer
52	3	"Episode 3"	Brian Penders	6 January 1979
Guests: Michael Redfern, The Manhattan Transfer
53	4	"Episode 4"	Brian Penders	13 January 1979
Guests: Julia Breck, John Rudling, Violet Pusey, The Manhattan Transfer
54	5	"Episode 5"	Brian Penders	20 January 1979
Guests: Carol Hawkins, Michael Redfern, Richard Hampton, John Owens, Ian Gray, Vikki Michelle, Joyce Windsor, Raymond Mason, Robert La Bassier, The Manhattan Transfer
55	6	"Episode 6"	Brian Penders	27 January 1979
Guests: April Walker, The Manhattan Transfer
56	7	"Episode 7"	Brian Penders	3 February 1979
Guests: Julia McKenzie, John Garvey, Dilys Watling, Vic Flick, The Manhattan Transfer
57	8	"Episode 8"	Brian Penders	10 February 1979
Guests: The Manhattan Transfer

=== Series 8 (1980) ===
No. overall	No. in series	Title	Produced and Directed by	Original release date
58	1	"Episode 1"	Paul Jackson	1 November 1980
Guests: Diana Dors, Reginald Marsh, Michael Redfern, John Owens, Jenny Logan, Elkie Brooks
59	2	"Episode 2"	Paul Jackson	8 November 1980
Guests: Carol Gilles, Reginald Marsh, Michael Redfern, April Walker, John Owens, Jenny Logan, Barbara Dickson
60	3	"Episode 3"	Paul Jackson	15 November 1980
Guests: Diana Dors, Anna Cropper, Carol Gilles, Alec Bregonzi, Noel Dyson, Johnnie Wade Rikki Howard, Michael Redfern, John Owens, Elkie Brooks
61	4	"Episode 4"	Paul Jackson	22 November 1980
Guests: Diana Dors, Gilly Flower, Barbara Keogh, Neil McCarthy, Barbara Dickson
62	5	"Episode 5"	Paul Jackson	29 November 1980
Guests: Jenny Logan, Raymond Mason, Elkie Brooks
63	6	"Episode 6"	Paul Jackson	6 December 1980
Guests: Wanda Ventham, Michael Nightingale, Ron Pember, Jenny Logan, Vicki Michelle, Barbara Dickson
64	7	"Episode 7"	Paul Jackson	13 December 1980
Guests: Wanta Ventham, Michael Nightingale, Patsy Smart, Jenny Logan, Elkie Brooks
65	8	"Episode 8"	Paul Jackson	26 December 1980
Guests: Diana Dors, Michael Cochrane, Anthony Dawes, Michael Nightingale, Barbara Shelley, Rowena Cooper, Barbara New, Treorchy Male Choir, The Dingbats, Gerry Cottle's Cirus

=== Series 9 (1981–82) ===
No. overall	No. in series	Title	Produced and Directed by	Original release date
66	1	"Episode 1"	Paul Jackson	5 December 1981
Guests: Elizabeth Larner, Rosie Collins, Kiki Dee, The Fred Tomlinson Singers
67	2	"Episode 2"	Paul Jackson	12 December 1981
Guests: Elizabeth Larner, Jenny Logan, Liz Whiting, Randy Crawford, Ronnie Hazlehurst & His Orchestra
68	3	"Episode 3"	Paul Jackson	19 December 1981
Guests: Elizabeth Larner, Josephine Tewson, Jenny Logan, Wesley Pestano, Liz Whiting, Laura Frances Hart, Marti Webb, The Fred Tomlinson Singers
69	4	"Episode 4"	Paul Jackson	25 December 1981
Guests: Rowena Cooper, Derek Fincham, Arnold Lee, Ling Tai, Jenny Logan, Liz Whiting, Chas & Dave, Sheena Easton, The Irving Davies Dancers
70	5	"Episode 5"	Paul Jackson	2 January 1982
Guests: Patricia Brake, Doremy Vernon, Jenny Logan, Liz Whiting, Madeline Bell, The Fred Tomlinson Singers
71	6	"Episode 6"	Paul Jackson	9 January 1982
Guests: Patricia Brake, Eleanor McCready, Claire Nielson, Jenny Logan, Liz Whiting, Sophie Neville, Elkie Brooks, Ronnie Hazlehurst & His Orchestra
72	7	"Episode 7"	Paul Jackson	16 January 1982
Guests: Elizabeth Larner, Anthony Chinn, John Owens, John Rutland, Clodagh Rodgers
73	8	"Episode 8"	Paul Jackson	23 January 1982
Guests: Patricia Brake, Elizabeth Larner, Anthony Chinn, Jenny Logan, Liz Whiting, Paul Luty, John Owens, John Rutland, Elaine Paige

=== Christmas Special (1982) ===
No. overall	No. in series	Title	Produced by	Directed by	Original release date
74	1	"Christmas Special"	Paul Jackson; Marcus Plantin	Paul Jackson	25 December 1982
Guests: Brigit Forsyth, Michael Redfern, Alec Bregonzi, Ken Sedd, Derek Ware, David Esssex, The Lordship Ringers, The Fred Tomlinson Singers

=== Series 10 (1983–84) ===
No. overall	No. in series	Title	Produced and Directed by	Original release date
75	1	"Episode 1"	Marcus Plantin	10 December 1983
Guests: Robin Parkinson, Leslie Ash, Alec Bregonzi, Elaine Paige, The Fred Tomlinson Singers
76	2	"Episode 2"	Marcus Plantin	17 December 1983
Guests: Patricia Routledge, Robert Raglan, Claire Nielson, Hilda Braid, Candy Davis, Ann Michelle, Ian Gray, Stephanie Lawrence, The Fred Tomlinson Singers
77	3	"Episode 3"	Marcus Plantin	25 December 1983
Guests: Carol Hawkins, Ron Pember, Ann Michelle, Gerrie Raymond, John Rutland, Elton John, The Fred Tomlinson Singers
78	4	"Episode 4"	Marcus Plantin	1 January 1984
Guests: Patrick Troughton, Patricia Brake, John Owens, April Walker, Elaine Paige, His Majesty's Sagbutts and Cornetts
79	5	"Episode 5"	Marcus Plantin	7 January 1984
Guests: Madge Hindle, Stephanie Lawrence
80	6	"Episode 6"	Marcus Plantin	14 January 1984
Guests: Dilys Watling, Eleanor McCready, Roberta Tovey, Barbara Dickson

=== Christmas Special (1984) ===
No. overall	No. in series	Title	Produced and Directed by	Original release date
81	1	"Christmas Special"	Marcus Plantin	25 December 1984
Guests: Peter Wyngarde, Ron Pember, Patrick Troughton, Michael Cantwell, Derek Ware, John Owens, John Rutland, Elaine Paige, His Majesty's Sagbutts and Cornetts, The Fred Tomlinson Singers

=== Series 11 (1985) ===
No. overall	No. in series	Title	Produced and Directed by	Original release date
82	1	"Episode 1"	Marcus Plantin	13 February 1985
Guests: Sandra Dickinson, Kenny Whymark, Elaine Paige, The Fred Tomlinson Singers
83	2	"Episode 2"	Marcus Plantin	20 February 1985
Guests: Leslie Sands, Nosher Powell, Ann Hamilton, Alec Bregonzi, Elaine Paige, The Zac Herbert Steel Band
84	3	"Episode 3"	Marcus Plantin	6 March 1985
Guests: Noel Dyson, Steve Emerson, Candy Davis, Elaine Paige
85	4	"Episode 4"	Marcus Plantin	13 March 1985
Guests: Helen Fraser, Priscilla Morgan, Candy Davis, Patricia Brake, Elaine Paige, The Fred Tomlinson Singers
86	5	"Episode 5"	Marcus Plantin	20 March 1985
Guests: Frank Williams, Ann Michelle, William Lucas, Ann Hamilton, Steve Emerson, Stuart Fell, Elaine Paige

=== Series 12 (1985–86) ===
No. overall	No. in series	Title	Produced by	Directed by	Original release date
87	1	"Episode 1"	Marcus Mortimer	Michael Hurll	25 December 1985
Guests: John Blythe, Anna Carteret, Alan Starkey, Howard Lew Lewis, Phil Collins, The Fred Tomlinson Singers
88	2	"Episode 2"	Marcus Mortimer	Michael Hurll	4 January 1986
Guests: Susannah York, Koo Stark, Patricia Brake, Derek Ware, Barbara Dickson, The Santus Julien Troupe, The Fred Tomlinson Singers
89	3	"Episode 3"	Marcus Mortimer	Michael Hurll	11 January 1986
Guests: Joanna Lumley, Michael Redfern, Candy Davis, Claire Oberman, Phil Collins, The Fred Tomlinson Singers
90	4	"Episode 4"	Marcus Mortimer	Michael Hurll	18 January 1986
Guests: Debbie Arnold, Barbara Dickson
91	5	"Episode 5"	Marcus Mortimer	Michael Hurll	25 January 1986
Guests: Jenny Agutter, Ian Ogilvy, Derek Deadman, Vicki Scott, Phil Collins, The Fred Tomlinson Singers
92	6	"Episode 6"	Marcus Mortimer	Michael Hurll	1 February 1986
Guests: Eryl Maynard, Ann Michelle, Annabel Price, Roberta Tovey, Derek Ware, John Owens, Andrée Bernard, Barbara Dickson

=== Christmas Special (1987) ===
No. overall	No. in series	Title	Produced by	Directed by	Original release date
93	1	"Christmas Special"	Marcus Mortimer	Michael Hurll	25 December 1987
Guests: Lynda Baron, Sandra Dickinson, Frank Finlay, Charlton Heston, Alfred Marks, Denis Quilley, Maria Charles, Walter Sparrow, Ed Bishop, Alec Bregonzi, Derek Ware, Elton John, The Jeff Thacker Dancers, The Fred Tomlinson Singers

== DVD releases ==
The BBC Archives retains all episodes of The Two Ronnies in their entirety that were originally transmitted. In April 2007 (18 months after Barker's death), 2 Entertain began releasing The Two Ronnies on DVD in Britain. Series One and Two—including a definitive collection of their Christmas specials with segments from Christmas Night with the Stars, the Old-Fashioned Christmas Mystery, and three other Christmas shows—were released on 30 April, 2 July, and 29 October 2007, respectively.

As of 24 September 2012, with the release of The Picnic, By the Sea and The One Ronnie as part of The Complete Collection, every single episode has now been released on DVD.

The Two Ronnies were released in Region 4 (Australia) on the following dates: The Best of The Two Ronnies Volume 1 on 4 March 2002, The Best of The Two Ronnies Volume 2 on 17 March 2003, Series 1 on 4 July 2007, Series 2 (two discs) on 8 May 2008, Series 3 on 5 March 2009, Series 4 (two discs) on 4 August 2009, Series 5 on 4 March 2010, Series 6 on 5 August 2010, and Series 7 on 3 March 2011. The Two Ronnies in Australia was released on 28 June 2008 with all-region coding.

DVD Title	Discs	Year	No. of Ep.	DVD release	
DVD Title	Discs	Year	No. of Ep.	Region 2	Region 4
Complete Series 1	2	10 April – 29 May 1971	8	30 April 2007	4 July 2007
Complete Series 2	2	16 September – 4 November 1972	8	2 July 2007	8 May 2008
Complete Series 3	2	27 September 1973 – 3 January 1974 (BBC2)	8	17 March 2008	5 March 2009
Complete Series 4	2	2 January – 20 February 1975 (BBC2)	8	19 May 2008	6 August 2009
Complete Series 5	2	4 September – 23 October 1976	8	15 June 2009	4 March 2010
Complete Series 6	2	12 November 1977 – 7 January 1978	8	22 February 2010	5 August 2010
Complete Series 7	2	26 December 1978 – 10 February 1979	8	17 May 2010	3 March 2011
Complete Series 8	2	1 November – 26 December 1980	8	6 September 2010	2 June 2011
Complete Series 9	2	5 December 1981 – 23 January 1982	8	28 February 2011	1 March 2012
Complete Series 10	2	10 December 1983 – 14 January 1984	6	9 May 2011	5 September 2012
Complete Series 11	2	13 February – 20 March 1985	5	25 July 2011	3 April 2013
Complete Series 12	2	25 December 1985 – 1 February 1986	6	26 September 2011	7 August 2013
The Christmas Specials	2	26 December 1973, 25 December 1982, 25 December 1984, 25 December 1987	4	29 October 2007	6 November 2008
The Complete Collection	27	1971–1987, 2010	96	24 September 2012	19 July 2017
The Picnic and By the Sea	1	1 January 1976 (The Picnic), 12 April 1982 (By the Sea)	2	—	10 June 2015
Two Ronnies in Australia	2	1986	6	—	28 June 2008
The Best of...Volume 1	1	1971–1984	1 Compilation	1 October 2001	4 March 2002
The Best of...Volume 2	1	1971–1985	1 Compilation	29 September 2003	17 March 2003
