= Ronnie Hazlehurst =

English composer and conductor (1928–2007)

- Hazlehurst in 1961
- Born: Ronald Hazlehurst; 13 March 1928; Dukinfield, Cheshire, England
- Died: 1 October 2007 (aged 79); St Martin, Guernsey
- Occupations: Composer; conductor; musical director
- Years active: 1947–2006
- Known for: British television theme songs
- Spouse: Jean Fitzgerald
- Children: 2

Ronald Hazlehurst (13 March 1928 – 1 October 2007) was an English composer and conductor who, having joined the BBC in 1961, became its Light Entertainment Musical Director.

Hazlehurst composed the theme tunes for many well-known British sitcoms and game shows of the 1970s and the 1980s, including Yes Minister, Are You Being Served?, I Didn't Know You Cared and Last of the Summer Wine.

== Early life ==
Ronald Hazlehurst was born in Dukinfield, Cheshire in 1928 to a railway worker father and a piano teacher mother. Having attended Hyde County Grammar School, he left at the age of 14 and became a clerk in a cotton mill for £1 a week. From 1947 to 1949, he did his National Service as a bandsman in the 4th/7th Royal Dragoon Guards.

During his spare time, he played in a band and soon became a professional musician, earning £4 a week. The band appeared on the BBC Light Programme, but Hazlehurst left when he was refused a pay rise. Moving to Manchester, he became a freelance musician until he was offered a place in another band at a nightclub in London. Ronnie Hazlehurst worked at Granada for about a year in 1955 and (after he left there) worked on a market stall in Watford to make ends meet.

== BBC career ==
Hazlehurst joined the BBC in 1961 and became a staff arranger; his early works included the incidental music for The Likely Lads, The Liver Birds and It's a Knockout. In 1968, he became the Light Entertainment Musical Director and (during his tenure) he composed the theme tunes of many sitcoms, including Are You Being Served?, Some Mothers Do 'Ave 'Em, Last of the Summer Wine (where he also wrote all the instrumental music for the series), I Didn't Know You Cared, The Fall and Rise of Reginald Perrin, To the Manor Born, Yes, Minister, Yes, Prime Minister, Just Good Friends, and Three Up, Two Down. He also arranged the themes for Butterflies, Sorry! and the first series of Only Fools and Horses. In addition, he wrote the theme tunes for the sketch show The Two Ronnies, the game shows Blankety Blank, Odd One Out, Bruce Forsyth's The Generation Game, and the chat show Wogan. His theme tunes often included elements designed to fit the programmes, such as a cash till in Are You Being Served?, rises and falls in The Fall and Rise of Reginald Perrin and the Big Ben chimes for Yes Minister. For Some Mothers Do 'Ave 'Em, Hazlehurst used Morse code to spell out the programme's title. During his BBC career, he composed the music for the opening of the BBC's coverage of the 1976 Summer Olympics held in Montreal. He left the BBC in the 1990s.

== Other work ==
Hazlehurst was also involved with the Eurovision Song Contest and was the musical director when the event was hosted by the United Kingdom in 1974, 1977 and 1982. He also conducted the British entry on seven occasions, in 1977, 1982, 1987, 1988, 1989, 1991 and 1992. In 1977, as well as conducting the British entry, he also conducted the German entry. To conduct the British entry that year, Lynsey de Paul and Mike Moran, he used a closed umbrella instead of a baton and wore a bowler hat.

He also arranged and conducted two singers' performances of their voice-overs for opening credits, Clare Torry for Butterflies ("Love Is like a Butterfly") and Paul Nicholas for Just Good Friends.

He also recorded some LPs and CDs with his orchestra including a 2-CD box set of Laurel and Hardy film music; his orchestra also backed singer Marti Caine on an album that was released on CD.

== Selected credits ==
- The Likely Lads
- It's a Knockout
- Comedy Playhouse
- The Illustrated Weekly Hudd
- Beggar My Neighbour
- Cilla
- The Gnomes of Dulwich
- Harry Worth (series 4 only)
- Me Mammy
- The Roy Castle Show
- That's Your Funeral
- The Liver Birds (Series 1-5)
- The Two Ronnies
- Now Look Here
- Are You Being Served?
- Tarbuck's Luck
- The Generation Game
- Last of the Summer Wine
- Look Mike Yarwood!
- Some Mothers Do 'Ave 'Em
- Whatever Happened to the Likely Lads?
- The Tarbuck Follies
- Frost's Weekly
- Eurovision Song Contest
- Happy Ever After
- It's Cliff and Friends
- Seaside Special
- I Didn't Know You Cared
- The Fall and Rise of Reginald Perrin
- The Other One
- Are You Being Served? (Film)
- Citizen Smith
- Rosie
- The Boys and Mrs B (TV Movie)
- The Val Doonican Show
- Wodehouse Playhouse
- Mike Yarwood in Persons
- Butterflies
- Blankety Blank
- To the Manor Born
- The Paul Daniels Magic Show
- Sink or Swim
- Yes Minister
- The Marti Cane Show
- Coming Home
- Only Fools and Horses
- Sorry!
- Roger Doesn't Live Here Anymore
- Three of a Kind
- The Little and Large Show
- L for Lester
- Solo
- Goodbye, Mr Kent
- The Keith Harris Show
- Then Churchill Said to Me
- Odd One Out
- By the Sea (TV film)
- Wogan
- Top of the Pops
- Jack of Diamonds
- Pinkerton's Progress
- Sweet Sixteen
- No Place Like Home
- Potter (series 3 only)
- Just Good Friends
- The Magnificent Evans
- Leaving
- The Hello Goodbye Man
- Comrade Dad
- Lame Ducks
- The District Nurse
- Yes Prime Minister
- The Les Dawson Show
- Three Up, Two Down
- All in Good Faith
- Dear John
- The Ritz
- Wyatt's Watchdogs
- Luv
- The Legacy of Reginald Perrin

== Later years ==
Hazlehurst moved from Hendon, North London to Guernsey in about 1997. In 1999, he was awarded a Gold Badge from the British Academy of Composers and Songwriters.

Music was Hazlehurst's life and passion (as well as his work) and he continued to work right up to his heart bypass operation in October 2006. On 27 September 2007, he suffered a stroke and, without regaining consciousness, died on 1 October at Princess Elizabeth Hospital in St Martin, Guernsey. Having been married twice (with two sons from his second marriage) at the time of his death, his partner was Jean Fitzgerald.

== Legacy ==
Hazlehurst is commemorated by a blue plaque on the front of the house of his birth on Lodge Lane, Dukinfield, which was unveiled in 2009.

=== In popular culture ===
By the early 1980s, Hazlehurst's work had become sufficiently well-known to the general public that he was lampooned in a Spitting Image sketch (voiced by Harry Enfield and written by Ian Hislop and Nick Newman, with music by Keith Strachan) in which his career and music (including a fictional 15-second Requiem mass, in the style of one of his TV themes) was covered by The South Bank Show. The sketch was also included on the CD 'Spit in Your Ear', released in 1992.

Preceded by (Luxembourg) Pierre Cao	Eurovision Song Contest conductor 1974	Succeeded by (Sweden) Mats Olsson
Preceded by (Netherlands) Jan Stulen	Eurovision Song Contest conductor 1977	Succeeded by (France) François Rauber
Preceded by (Republic of Ireland) Noel Kelehan	Eurovision Song Contest conductor 1982	Succeeded by (Germany) Dieter Reith
