= James Gilbert (producer) =

TV producer and director (1923–2016)

- Born: Cecil James Gilbert; 15 May 1923; Edinburgh, Scotland
- Died: 7 July 2016 (aged 93); Rodborough, Gloucestershire, England
- Occupations: Television executive; producer; director
- Television: The Two Ronnies; Whatever Happened to the Likely Lads? Last of the Summer Wine; French Fields
- Spouse: Fiona Clyne (m. 1951)
- Children: 3

Cecil James Gilbert (15 May 1923 – 7 July 2016) was a Scottish television producer, director and executive for the BBC, who was its head of comedy from 1973 to 1977 and head of light entertainment from 1977 to 1982.

== Early life ==
Gilbert was born in Edinburgh on 15 May 1923. His father had moved to Scotland from Ireland. Gilbert was educated at Edinburgh Academy and the University of Edinburgh, though his studies at the latter ended after a year, when he joined the RAF Coastal Command during World War II, flying Handley Page Halifax and Boeing B-17 Flying Fortress aircraft from RAF Wick, Scotland.

== Career ==
After the war, Gilbert enrolled at the Royal Academy of Dramatic Art, and he initially aspired to direct films. However, he also acted and wrote for theatre, and it was through this that he began a collaboration with Julian More; their 1956 show Grab Me a Gondola was a success, and led to Gilbert being offered a trainee position at the BBC. He began his career there in music before transitioning his focus to comedy.

As the co-devisor of The Frost Report, with David Frost, it was Gilbert who brought together Ronnie Barker and Ronnie Corbett, as well as most of the members of Monty Python. With the first director of The Two Ronnies, Terry Hughes, Gilbert created the format of the series which began in 1971. According to the Daily Telegraph obituary of Gilbert, the two men "were largely responsible for establishing the pattern of the show with its quick-fire verbal gags, double entendres and cavalcade of naive caricatures of British life: bumbling colonels, half-witted yokels and bosomy barmaids". The series ran until 1986. In addition to The Two Ronnies, Gilbert was an early producer of Last of the Summer Wine (1973), plus the first series of Whatever Happened to the Likely Lads? (also 1973). For the last series, Gilbert won a BAFTA in 1974 for Best Comedy, and was also nominated that year for Last of the Summer Wine in the category.

He succeeded Michael Mills as the BBC's Head of Comedy from 1973 to 1977. Gilbert was appointed as the BBC's Head of Light Entertainment in 1977, in succession to Bill Cotton, remaining in the post and with the BBC until 1982. Subsequently, he worked freelance with Thames Television, until retiring at age 75.

In 2003, Gilbert appeared on the documentary special 30 Years of Last of the Summer Wine to discuss his role in helping to create the series.

== Personal life and death ==
In 1951, Gilbert married Fiona Clyne, and they had three children.

In retirement, Gilbert lived in Rodborough, Gloucestershire, and died from bronchopneumonia and "frailty of old age" at his home on 7 July 2016, at the age of 93.
