= Porridge (1974 TV series) =

British TV sitcom (1974–1977)

- Seres' title shot, showing the entrance to the fictional Slade prison.
- Created by: Dick Clement; Ian La Frenais
- Written by: Dick Clement; Ian La Frenais
- Directed by: Sydney Lotterby
- Starring: Ronnie Barker; Richard Beckinsale; Brian Wilde; Patricia Brake; Peter Vaughan; Brian Glover; Christopher Biggins; Tony Osoba; Sam Kelly; Fulton Mackay; Ronald Lacey; Ken Jones; David Jason
- Country of origin: United Kingdom
- Original language: English
- No. of series: 3
- No. of episodes: 21 (list of episodes)

Production
- Producer: Sydney Lotterby
- Production location: BBC Television Centre
- Running time: 30–45 minutes
- Production company: BBC

Original release
- Network: BBC1
- Release: 1 April 1973 (pilot); 5 September 1974 (series); – 25 March 1977

Related
- Going Straight (1978)

Porridge is a British sitcom, starring Ronnie Barker and Richard Beckinsale, written by Dick Clement and Ian La Frenais, and broadcast on BBC1 from 1974 to 1977, after a pilot episode in 1973. The programme ran for three series and two Christmas specials. A feature film of the same name based on the series was released in 1979, after Beckinsale's death in March of that year.

The sitcom focuses on two prison inmates, Norman Fletcher (played by Barker) and Lennie Godber (played by Beckinsale), who are serving time at the fictional HMP Slade in Cumberland. The show's title comes from a 1950s British slang term for a prison sentence, derived from the traditional breakfast that used to be served in British prisons.

Porridge was critically acclaimed and is widely considered to be one of the greatest British sitcoms of all time. It is ranked No. 35 on the 100 Greatest British Television Programmes compiled by the British Film Institute in 2000. In 2004, Porridge placed seventh in a poll to find Britain's Best Sitcom.

The series was followed by a 1978 sequel, Going Straight, which saw Barker reprise his character as he tries to avoid going back to prison. Porridge was revived in 2016 under the same name, with Fletcher's grandson beginning a prison sentence.

== Premise ==
The main storylines of the sitcom focus on its central character, Norman Stanley Fletcher, a man from Muswell Hill, London. Fletcher, described as "an habitual criminal" by the judge who sentences him (and whose words, voiced by Barker, are repeated in the show's opening titles), is sent to HMP Slade, a fictional Category C prison in Cumberland, to serve a prison sentence for his latest crime. The sitcom also follows his cellmate Lennie Godber, a naïve inmate from Birmingham serving his first sentence, whom Fletcher takes under his wing. Each episode's story focuses on their time in prison and the various issues they endure while serving their prison sentences.

While both Fletcher and Godber are the show's main characters, the series features two major supporting characters, both prison officers. The first is Mr Mackay, a tough and austere Scotsman with a clear dislike of Fletcher, with whom he often comes into conflict (and by whom he is often surreptitiously mocked). The other is Mr Barrowclough, Mackay's empathetic, progressive-minded subordinate, who is prone to manipulation by his charges because of his well-meaning character and principles. In a typical episode plot, Fletcher takes advantage of the naive Barrowclough to outsmart Mackay in his endeavours to enforce discipline or catch Fletcher or his friends in their misadventures. Whilst Mackay occasionally scores the odd minor victory, Fletcher nearly always comes out on top.

== Cast ==
=== Main cast ===
- Ronnie Barker as Norman Stanley "Fletch" Fletcher
- Fulton Mackay as Principal officer Mr MacKay
- Richard Beckinsale as Leonard Arthur "Lennie" Godber
- Brian Wilde as Prison officer Mr Henry Barrowclough
- Peter Vaughan as "Genial" Harry Grout
- Sam Kelly as "Bunny" Warren
- Tony Osoba as Jim McLaren
- Michael Barrington as Geoffrey Venables (the Governor)
- Christopher Biggins as Lukewarm

=== Recurring cast ===
- David Jason as Blanco Webb
- Ken Jones as Bernard "Horrible" Ives
- Patricia Brake as Ingrid Fletcher
- Maurice Denham as the Honourable Mr Justice Stephen Rawley
- Brian Glover as Cyril Heslop
- Ronald Lacey as Harris
- Paul McDowell as Mr Collinson
- Ray Dunbobbin as Evans
- Dudley Sutton as Reg Urwin
- Philip Madoc as Williams
- Alun Armstrong as Spraggon
- David Daker as Jarvis
- Eric Dodson as Banyard
- Peter Jeffrey as Napper Wainwright
- John Dair as Crusher
- Paul Angelis as Navy Rum
- Philip Jackson as Melvin "Dylan" Bottomley
- Jane Wenham as Mrs Dorothy Jamieson
- Madge Hindle as Mrs Hesketh
- Cyril Shaps as Jackdaw

The programme's scriptwriters appear, uncredited, outside Fletch and Godber's cell in the episode "No Peace for the Wicked". Ronnie Barker had suggested the part of Lennie Godber for Paul Henry, but the decision to cast Richard Beckinsale was taken by the production team.

== Production ==
=== Development ===
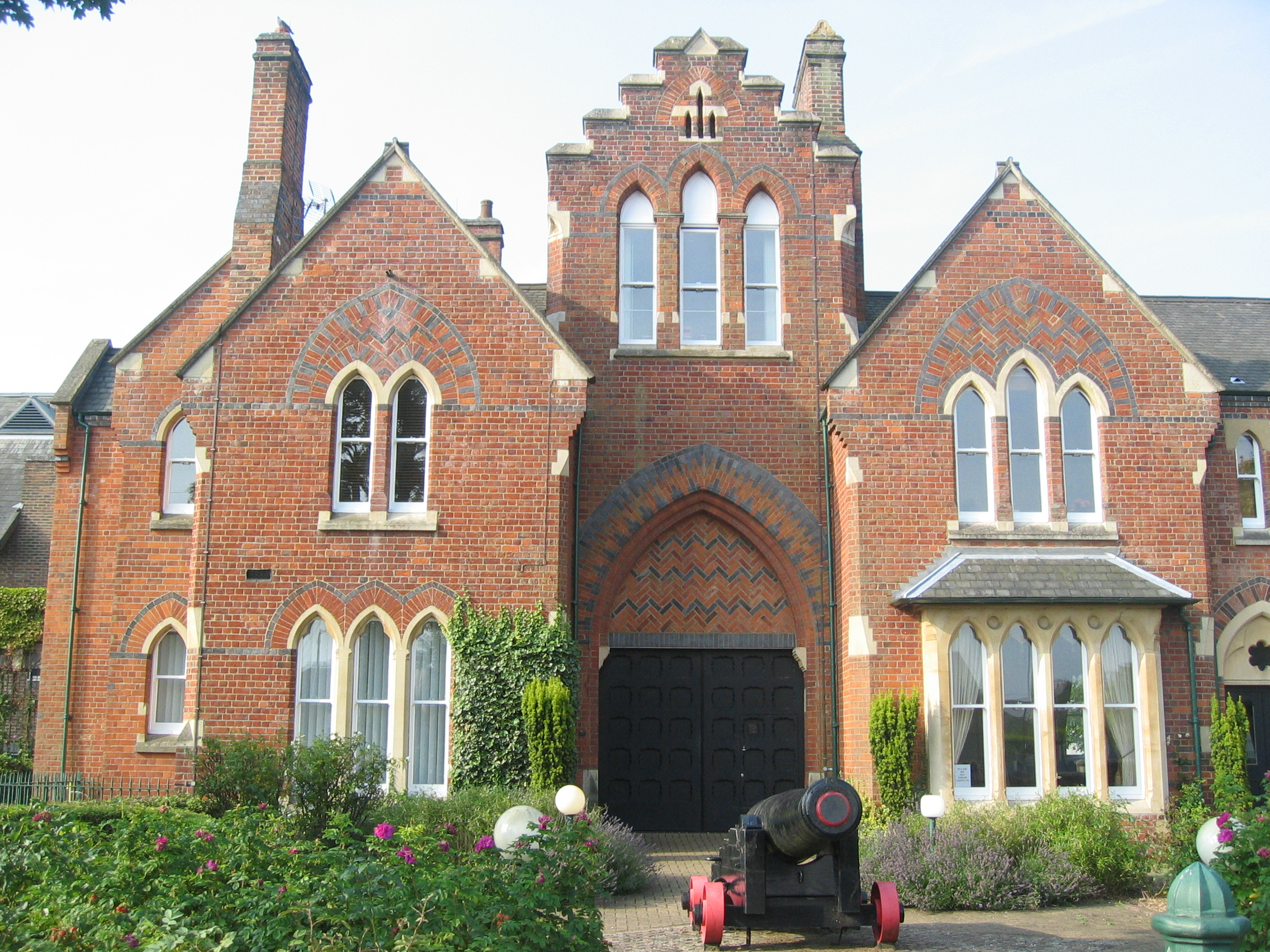
The frontage of the former St Albans Prison was used as the fictitious H.M. Prison Slade in Cumberland. The building is now a register office.

Porridge originated with the BBC's 1973 project Seven of One, which would see Ronnie Barker star in seven different situation comedy pilot episodes. The most successful would then be made into a full series. One of the episodes was "Prisoner and Escort", written by Dick Clement and Ian La Frenais about a newly sentenced habitual criminal, Norman Stanley Fletcher (Barker), being escorted to prison by two warders: the timid Barrowclough (Brian Wilde) and the stern Mackay (Fulton Mackay). It was broadcast on 1 April 1973 on BBC2. Despite Barker's initial preference for another of the pilots, a sitcom about a Welsh gambling addict, "Prisoner and Escort", was selected. It was renamed Porridge, a British slang term for a prison sentence from the 1950s; Barker, Clement and La Frenais actually came up with the same title independently of each other.

In their research, Clement and La Frenais spoke to Jonathan Marshall, a former prisoner who had written a book called How to Survive in the Nick (Allison and Busby, 1973), and he advised them about prison slang, dress, and routines. Struggling to think up plots and humour for such a downbeat and confined environment, a particular phrase used by Marshall – "little victories" – struck a chord and convinced them to base the series on an inmate who made his daily life in prison more bearable by beating the system, even in trivial ways.

The BBC was forced to look around for locations because the Home Office refused permission for any production filming inside or outside a real prison. Instead, the main gatehouse of the disused prison in Victoria Street, St Albans, was used in the opening credits. Exteriors were first filmed at Leavesden Hospital near Watford. However, after the completion of the second series, the hospital withdrew permission for more filming following complaints from patients' families. Another institution near Ealing was then used for the third series. Scenes within cells and offices were filmed at the BBC's London studios, but for shots of the wider prison interior, series production designer Tim Gleeson converted an old water tank, used at Ealing Studios for underwater filming, into a multi-storey set.

The first episode, "New Faces, Old Hands", was aired on BBC1 on 5 September 1974, attracting a television audience of more than 16 million, and receiving positive reviews from critics. Two further series were commissioned, as well as two Christmas special episodes. The final episode of Porridge, "Final Stretch", was broadcast on 25 March 1977. The producers and the writers were keen to make more episodes, but Barker was wary of being "stuck with a character" and also wanted to move on to other projects, so the series came to a close. Barker did, however, reprise his role as Fletcher in a sequel, Going Straight, which ran for one series in 1978. A feature-length version of the show was made in 1979, and in 2003 a follow-up mockumentary entitled Life Beyond the Box: Norman Stanley Fletcher was aired.

=== Locations ===
The prison exterior in the title sequence is the old St Albans prison gatehouse and HM Prison Maidstone, which was also featured in the BBC comedy series Birds of a Feather (HMP Slade is referred to in Birds of a Feather when the protagonists' husbands are imprisoned there after reoffending in Series 7). The interior shots of doors being locked were filmed in Shepherd's Bush police station as the BBC had a good relationship with officers there. In the episode "Pardon Me", Fletcher speaks to Blanco (David Jason) in the prison gardens: this was filmed in the grounds of an old brewery outside Baldock on the A505 to Royston. The barred windows approximated a prison. The building has since been demolished.

The 1974 episode "A Day Out", which features a prison work party, was filmed in and around the Welsh village of Penderyn, the prisoners' ditch being excavated by a JCB. Loftus Road, the home of Queens Park Rangers Football Club, was briefly featured in "Happy Release", standing in for Elland Road in Leeds.

In the episode "No Way Out", Fletcher tries to get MacKay to fall into a tunnel in the prison yard. These outside shots were filmed at St Bernard's Hospital in West London, the barred windows in this case being those of the hospital pharmacy. The interior shots for the 1979 film were shot entirely at HM Prison Chelmsford, Essex.

=== Titles and music ===
The opening credits consist of outside shots of Slade prison and of several doors and gates being closed and locked, which was intended to set the scene. In the first series, there were also shots of St Pancras railway station, which was changed in subsequent series to shots of Fletcher walking around Slade prison. Title music was thought unsuitable for a show set in prison, so instead there is a booming narration (voiced by Barker himself) given by the presiding judge passing sentence on Fletcher:

Norman Stanley Fletcher, you have pleaded guilty to the charges brought by this court, and it is now my duty to pass sentence. You are an habitual criminal, who accepts arrest as an occupational hazard, and presumably accepts imprisonment in the same casual manner. We therefore feel constrained to commit you to the maximum term allowed for these offences; you will go to prison for five years.

For series 1, the narration is "clean" (i.e. no effects) and plays in one complete piece. For series 2 and 3, it is broken down by sentence into three sections and has an echo effect added to increase the gravity of the "judge's" words, with each of the three sentences followed by shots of locking various doors around the "prison" with key locking sound effects.

Subsequently, Barker is reported to have said that he regretted recording himself as the judge, a role subsequently played by Maurice Denham in two episodes of the third series.

The theme music for the closing credits was written by Max Harris, who had also written the theme music for numerous other TV shows, including The Strange World of Gurney Slade, The Gold Robbers and Doomwatch, and would go on to arrange the theme for Open All Hours (which was written by Joseph Ascher), another of the Seven of One pilots. The cheery theme was "deliberately at variance with the dour comedy" and given a music hall feel by Harris because of the lead character's Cockney origins.

== Episodes ==
Following the pilot episode broadcast on 1 April 1973, the sitcom ran for three series between 5 September 1974 and 25 March 1977, with 20 episodes in total. Each episode was 30 minutes long, except for the two Christmas specials in 1975 and 1976, which were 40 and 45 minutes long respectively.

== Sequels ==
=== Going Straight ===
A sequel to Porridge, Going Straight, was aired between 24 February and 7 April 1978. Beginning with Fletcher's release from prison on parole, it follows his attempts to "go straight" and readjust to a law-abiding life. Richard Beckinsale reprised his role as Godber, now the fiancé of Fletcher's daughter Ingrid (Patricia Brake), and the couple married in the final episode. Nicholas Lyndhurst also featured as Fletcher's gormless son, Raymond. The series lasted six episodes, and generally was not as well received as its predecessor, although it did win two BAFTAs, for Best Situation Comedy and Best Light Entertainment Performance (jointly with The Two Ronnies) for Ronnie Barker.

=== Life Beyond the Box: Norman Stanley Fletcher ===
On Friday 26 December 2003, a mockumentary follow-up to Porridge was broadcast on BBC Two. It looked back on Fletcher's life and how the various inmates of Slade had fared 25 years after Fletcher's release from prison. Warren is now a sign painter, Lukewarm is in a civil partnership with Trevor, McLaren is an MSP, Grouty has become a celebrity gangster, Horrible Ives collects money for non-existent charities, Godber is still a lorry driver and still happily married to Ingrid, and Fletcher runs a pub with his childhood sweetheart, Gloria.

=== Porridge (2016) ===
On Sunday 28 August 2016, a one-off sequel to the original series, also titled Porridge, was broadcast on BBC One. It starred Kevin Bishop as Nigel Norman Fletcher, Norman Stanley Fletcher's grandson, serving five years in prison for computer hacking.

The special was written by the original creators and writers of Porridge, Dick Clement and Ian La Frenais. It gained praise from both viewers and TV critics, with many calling for a full series to be made. The overnight ratings showed an estimated 4.4 million people had watched it. Following the success of the initial episode, in October 2016 the BBC announced that a full series of six episodes had been commissioned, with production to start in January 2017. The full series was released online on 6 October 2017 on the BBC iPlayer as well as starting a six-week run on prime-time BBC One on Fridays.

== International adaptations ==
An American version entitled On the Rocks (1975–76) ran for a season, while a Dutch version Laat maar zitten (a pun: the title has several meanings, like "Don't mention it" and "Let it be", but in this case it can also be interpreted as "Let them do time") ran from 1988 to 1991; later episodes of the Netherlands version were original scripts, the series also had a very successful Portuguese remake entitled Camilo na Prisão ("Camilo in Prison").

== In other media ==
=== Film adaptation ===
Following the example of other sitcom crossovers, such as Dad's Army, Steptoe and Son and The Likely Lads, a feature-length version of Porridge was made in 1979. Barker again starred as Fletcher, and most of the supporting cast also returned. Unlike the television series, it was actually filmed at a real prison as HMP Chelmsford was temporarily vacant following a fire.

=== Novelisations and audio ===
Novelisations of the three series of Porridge were issued by BBC Books: Porridge by Jonathan Marshall (1975), Another Stretch of Porridge by Paul Victor (1976), and A Further Stir of Porridge by Paul Victor (1977). Going Straight was novelised under that title by Paul Victor in 1978. The film of Porridge was novelised as Porridge: The Inside Story by Paul Ableman, published by Pan Books in 1979.

The three BBC Porridge novelisations were published as the collected volume Three Helpings of Porridge (1984), republished as The Complete Porridge (1990).

BBC Enterprises released an LP record featuring two Porridge episodes, "A Night In" and "Heartbreak Hotel" in 1977.(REB 270) Two volumes of audio cassette releases ('Porridge' and 'More Porridge') comprising four episodes each, including the two episodes from the vinyl release, were issued in the mid-1990s, and later re-released on CD. A third volume of four episodes ('A Third Helping') was released on cassette in 2002.

=== Stage show ===
In 2009 Porridge was adapted into a stage show, also written by Clement and La Frenais, starring former EastEnders actor Shaun Williamson as Fletcher and Daniel West as Godber. Peter Kay, a fan of the show, was previously offered the role but turned it down. It opened in September 2009 to positive reviews.

=== Related publications ===
Ronnie Barker was the author of Fletcher's Book of Rhyming Slang (Pan, 1979), which includes an introduction by 'Fletch'.

The 2001 book Porridge: The Inside Story (not to be confused with the 1979 film novelisation of the same name) contains a series guide by Richard Webber and the scripts of the three seasons and the Christmas specials by Dick Clement and Ian La Frenais. The book was republished in 2005 under the title Porridge: The Complete Scripts and Series Guide.

=== Comedy Classics: Porridge ===
On 16 December 2023, Channel 5 aired a 66-minute special retrospective for their "Comedy Classics" series. Actors and celebrities, including two former cast members Christopher Biggins and Philip Jackson take a look back, discuss and pay tribute to the show.

== Home releases ==
Title	Year	Release date	
Title	Year	Region 2	Region 4
Complete Series 1	1974	1 October 2001	27 February 2003
Complete Series 2	1975	30 September 2002	9 March 2004
Porridge: Film	1979	14 April 2003	13 May 2002
Complete Series 3	1977	29 September 2003	8 July 2004
Complete Specials	1975–1976	4 October 2004	10 November 2004
Complete Series	1974–1977	19 October 2009	5 March 2008
The Complete Collection (HMV Exclusive)	1974–1977	4 November 2013	N/A

== Stamps ==
A set of special stamps celebrating the 50th anniversary of the TV show was issued by Royal Mail on 3 September 2024.

== Reception ==
=== Popularity with prisoners ===
Porridge was immensely popular with British prisoners. Erwin James, an ex-prisoner who wrote a bi-weekly column for The Guardian newspaper, stated that:

What fans could never know, however, unless they had been subjected to a stint of Her Majesty's Pleasure, was that the conflict between Fletcher and Officer Mackay was about the most authentic depiction ever of the true relationship that exists between prisoners and prison officers in British jails up and down the country. I'm not sure how, but writers Dick Clement and Ian La Frenais ... grasped the notion that it is the minor victories against the naturally oppressive prison system that makes prison life bearable.

He also noted:

When I was inside, Porridge was a staple of our TV diet. In one high-security prison, a video orderly would be dispatched to tape the programme each week. If they missed it, they were in trouble.

=== Contributions to the English language ===
The script allowed the prisoners to swear without offending viewers by using the word "naff" in place of ruder words ("Naff off!", "Darn your own naffing socks", "Doing next to naff all"), thereby popularising a word that had been virtually unknown and the first recorded use of which was in 1966. Ronnie Barker did not claim to have invented it and in a television interview in 2003 it was explained to him on camera what the word meant, as he did not have a clue. The word is used in another Clement and La Frenais penned series, Auf Wiedersehen Pet, by the character of Oz who, after nearly being hit by falling scaffolding, calls one of the other workers a "naffing arsehole".

A genuine neologism was "nerk", which was used in place of the more offensive "berk". "Berk" has changed meaning since its inception and is generally used now to mean "fool" while the original rhyming slang meaning refers to female genitalia (via "Berkeley Hunt"). Another term was "scrote" (presumably derived from scrotum), meaning a nasty, unpleasant person.

== See also ==
- British sitcom
- Birds of a Feather (TV series) (1989)
- Women in Prison (TV series) (1987)

== Bibliography ==
- Webber, Richard (2005). Porridge: The Complete Scripts and Series Guide. London: Headline Book Publishing. ISBN 0-7553-1535-9
