= The Two Ronnies Sketchbook =

- Written by: Bryan Blackburn; Ronnie Barker
- Starring: Ronnie Barker; Ronnie Corbett
- Country of origin: United Kingdom
- Original language: English
- No. of series: 1
- No. of episodes: 7 (inc. Christmas Special)

Production
- Running time: 60 mins / 30 mins (edit repeats only)

Original release
- Network: BBC One
- Release: 18 March – 25 December 2005

Related
- The Two Ronnies

The Two Ronnies Sketchbook is a collection of sketches from the BBC comedy series The Two Ronnies, with newly filmed introductions by the stars, Ronnie Barker and Ronnie Corbett. It was first broadcast 34 years after the first episode of The Two Ronnies was aired and 18 years after the final episode aired.

The show came about following the BBC's broadcast of Ronnie Barker: A Bafta Tribute in February 2004, a show which gained a large audience (7.2 million), demonstrating interest remained in Barker's work in comedy. The BAFTA lifetime achievement award was presented to Barker by Ronnie Corbett. The chemistry between the two men was shown to still exist.

Six hour-long episodes of The Two Ronnies Sketchbook aired on BBC One in March and April 2005. It saw the Two Ronnies return behind their news desk, introducing some of their favourite sketches and re-reading some of the comic news items that began and ended every episode of The Two Ronnies. Much was made of the fact that the sketches chosen were shown in their entirety. Each week an episode of the Spike Milligan-scripted serial The Phantom Raspberry Blower of Old London Town was shown, and each episode featured a new performance by a popular singer.

The sketches chosen were considered true classics – the short-sighted optician, 'Your nuts, m'lord', the Mastermind spoof (Specialist subject: Answering the Question Before Last), and, the sketch voted the nation's favourite, Four Candles (this last sketch was kept until the very end of the sixth episode, pretending they had forgotten about it). The newly recorded introductions provided an opportunity for plenty of good-humoured banter between the pair. The show was met with approval from audiences – 7.9 million tuning in for the opening episode, with many of them too young to have seen The Two Ronnies when it was first broadcast. Ronnie Corbett later said that Ronnie Barker was "delighted that the Two Ronnies Sketchbook had gone so well, bringing us to a new generation of audiences".

This would end up being Barker's final television work. He appeared frail and had lost a lot of weight, and it later became clear that he had been very unwell with a heart condition whilst filming the show. However, he was determined to record one final Christmas special of The Two Ronnies, and so, on 5 July 2005, The Two Ronnies Christmas Sketchbook was recorded. It was broadcast on Christmas Day of the same year, two months after Barker's death (Ronnie Corbett paid tribute to him in a specially recorded introduction to the show), and saw the pair introduce their favourite sketches from their Christmas shows. Again, the show was a rousing success, and – with 7.93 million viewers – as the fourth most watched programme on Christmas Day.

== Repeat broadcasts ==
The full series of The Two Ronnies Sketchbook was repeated on GOLD daily in Autumn 2007 but was edited to a 30-minute time slot; therefore, the show was broadcast in 12 episodes consecutively instead of six 60-minute shows. Since then, the full series has not been repeated but The Two Ronnies Christmas Sketchbook has been repeated over the festive period on both GOLD and BBC One. In December 2011, BBC One repeated some episodes of the series again but only in the 30-minute format. On 23 December 2011, BBC One repeated a full sixty-minute episode of The Two Ronnies Sketchbook for the first time since 2005. On 2, 3 and 4 January 2013, BBC One again repeated three thirty-minute edited episodes of the show; further repeats have been broadcast on GOLD since 1 November 2013. Repeat broadcastings of the 30-minute edited shows aired again in December 2014 on BBC One on Fridays in the 7:30pm slot. GOLD regularly repeats the series and has recently been showing episodes cut down to 45 minutes, to allow adverts. Episode 3 was repeated on BBC One in thirty-minute form on 1 April 2016, after the death of Ronnie Corbett. During December 2020, BBC Four repeated the show in the 30-minute format for the Christmas holidays.

As of 2025, BBC iPlayer has episodes one and two in the 60-minute versions, complete with guest singers (Katie Melua and Alison Moyet) and episodes of "The Phantom Raspberry Blower of Old London Town" yet the remaining four episodes are inexplicably of the edited 30-minute versions, losing any guests and the remaining parts of the sketch serial.
