= Ronnie Barker =

English actor, comedian and writer (1929–2005)

Ronnie Barker OBE
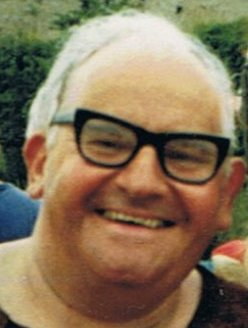
- Barker in the 1980s
- Born: Ronald William George Barker; 25 September 1929; Bedford, Bedfordshire, England
- Died: 3 October 2005 (aged 76); Adderbury, Oxfordshire, England
- Other names: Jonathan Cobbald; Bob Ferris; Jack Goetz; David Huggett; F.B. Jones; Gerald Wiley
- Education: City of Oxford High School for Boys
- Occupations: Actor, comedian, writer
- Years active: 1946–2005
- Spouse: Joy Tubb (m. 1957)
- Children: 3, including Charlotte

Comedy career
- Medium: Books, film, stand-up comedy, television, theatre
- Genres: Black comedy, improvisational comedy, insult comedy, observational comedy, ribaldry, shock humour

Ronald William George Barker (25 September 1929 – 3 October 2005) was an English actor, comedian and writer. He was known for roles in British comedy television series such as The Frost Report, The Two Ronnies, Porridge, and Open All Hours.

Barker began acting in Oxford amateur dramatics while working as a bank clerk, having dropped out of higher education. He moved into repertory theatre with the Aylesbury Repertory Company and decided he was best suited to comic roles. He had his first success at the Oxford Playhouse and in roles in the West End including Tom Stoppard's The Real Inspector Hound. During this period, he was in the cast of several BBC radio and television comedies, most notably the radio sitcom The Navy Lark. He got his television break with David Frost's satirical sketch series The Frost Report (1966–67), where he worked with John Cleese and Ronnie Corbett, the latter becoming Barker's long-time comedy partner. He joined Frost's production company and starred in several ITV shows during the late 1960s.

After rejoining the BBC in the early 1970s, Barker and Corbett achieved significant success with the sketch show The Two Ronnies (1971–87). The duo maintained their careers as solo performers; Barker notably starred as inmate Norman Stanley Fletcher in the sitcom Porridge (1974–77) and its sequel Going Straight (1978) and as shopkeeper Arkwright in the sitcom Open All Hours (1976–85). He wrote comedy under his own name, though for much of his written material after 1968 he adopted pseudonyms (including "Gerald Wiley") to avoid pre-judgment of his writing talent. He won a BAFTA for best light entertainment performance four times, among other awards, and was appointed an OBE in 1978.

Barker's later sitcoms such as The Magnificent Evans (1984) and Clarence (1988) were less successful and he retired in December 1987. The following year, he opened an antiques shop with his wife, Joy. After 1999, he appeared in smaller, non-comic roles in films. He died of heart failure on 3 October 2005, aged 76.

== Early life ==
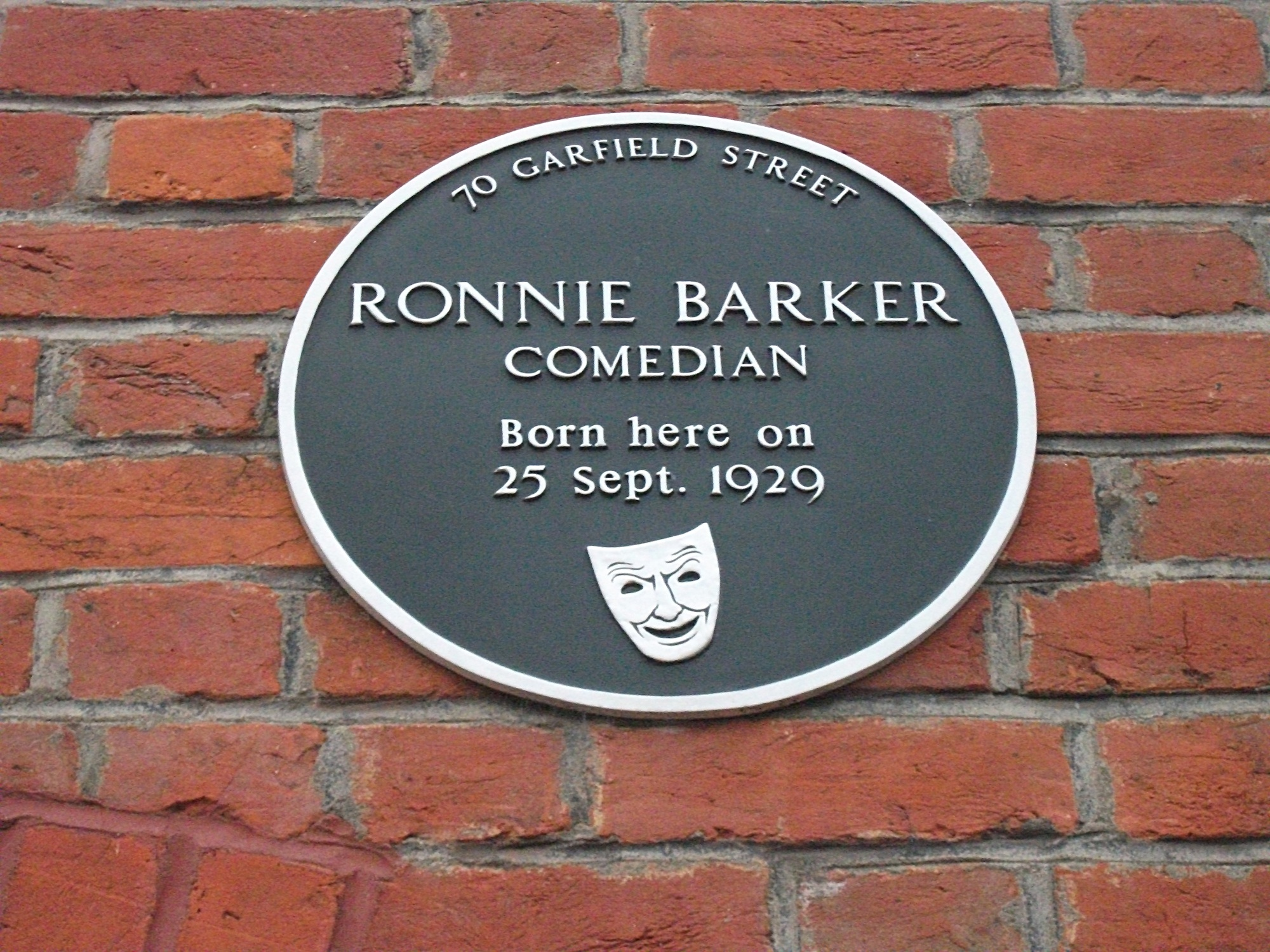
Plaque marking Barker's birthplace

Barker was born on 25 September 1929 at 70 Garfield Street, Bedford, the only son of Leonard William Barker (always known as "Tim") and Edith Eleanor (née Carter; known as "Sis", by virtue of being the youngest sister amongst her siblings).

Barker's elder sister Vera was born in 1926 and his younger sister Eileen was born in 1933. His father was a clerk for Shell-Mex, and this job saw the family move to Church Cowley Road in Cowley, Oxfordshire, when Barker was four.

Barker's biographer Bob McCabe described Barker's childhood as "a happy time, marred by no ructions or family tensions, apart from the occasional wet sock." As a child, Barker enjoyed dressing up, particularly in his father's pierrot outfit, as well as films, comics and animals. He developed a love of the theatre, often attending plays with his family. The first play he saw was Cottage to Let and he once skipped school to see Laurence Olivier in Henry V. He frequently stood outside stage doors to collect autographs, his first being the actress Celia Johnson.

Barker grew up in the Florence Park area of Oxford, and went to Donnington Junior School, and then the City of Oxford High School for Boys. His chemistry textbook at Oxford had previously been used by T. E. Lawrence. He found his talent for humour at school and developed his musical ability by singing in the choir at St James's, his local church. He got into the sixth form a year early after gaining the School Certificate but he felt what he was learning would be of no use to him in later life and so left as soon as he could.

After leaving school, he trained as an architect; however, feeling he was not skilled enough, he quit after six months. Barker took his sister Vera's job as a bank clerk at the Westminster Bank after she had left to become a nurse. He harboured dreams of becoming an actor, and took up amateur dramatics, although initially he just saw the pastime as a chance to meet girls.

For 18 months, while at the bank, he worked as an actor and stage manager, making his first appearance in A Murder Has Been Arranged as the musical director of the play-within-a-play. Eventually he gave up his job to become a professional actor. His father did not support his acting ambition.

== Career ==
=== Theatrical career ===
Barker failed to get into the Young Vic School, but joined the Aylesbury Repertory Company, which was based in Aylesbury, Buckinghamshire, often taking comic roles in their weekly shows. Initially he was employed as the assistant to the assistant stage manager, earning £2.10s. 0d (£2.50) a week. He made his debut as a professional actor on 15 November 1948 as Lieutenant Spicer in a performance of J. M. Barrie's Quality Street. He went on to play the organist in When We Are Married and by his third role, the chauffeur Charles in Miranda, Barker realised he wanted to be a comic actor. He was described as "ha[ving] the talent to be a great straight actor", but noted: "I want to make people laugh. Never mind about Hamlet. Forget Richard the Second. Give me Charley's Aunt. My mission in life was now crystal clear." He appeared in stage adaptations of Treasure Island and Red Riding Hood before getting his first leading role in The Guinea Pig as a working-class boy at a public school. When the production moved to Rhyl, Barker followed. The Aylesbury Repertory Company closed, as did the Rhyl company shortly after.

Barker, aged 20, then spent some time as a porter at Wingfield Hospital; he became distressed through his contact with polio patients and so opted to take on the persona of "Charlie" so as not to be himself. He and a male nurse often entertained the patients with comedy routines. He found work at the Mime Theatre Company, performing mimed folk music and dance, which soon folded in Penzance. He made his way back to Oxford and then worked in Bramhall for the Famous Players. There he met actor Glenn Melvyn; the two became firm friends and Barker stated Melvyn taught him everything he "ever learned about comedy".

Barker joined the Oxford Playhouse in 1951 and worked there for three years, appearing in plays such as He Who Gets Slapped as Polly. Peter Hall worked with Barker at Oxford and gave him his break, casting him as the Chantyman and Joe Silva in his production of Mourning Becomes Electra at the Arts Theatre in London's West End in 1955. By the time he had made it to the West End, Barker had appeared in an estimated 350 plays.

Barker remained a West End actor for several years, appearing in numerous plays between 1955 and 1968. These included, in 1955, two performances each night as he played a gypsy in Listen to the Wind at the Arts Theatre and then a peasant in Summertime later in the evening. His other roles included Mr. Thwaites in Double Image in 1956 (with Olivier), Camino Real (directed by Hall) in 1957, French gangster Robertoles-Diams in Irma La Douce for two years from 1958, Lord Slingsby-Craddock in Mr. Whatnot in 1964 and Birdboot in The Real Inspector Hound in 1968. He also appeared in several Royal Court Theatre productions, including A Midsummer Night's Dream as Quince.

=== Early media career ===
Barker's theatrical success enabled him to move into radio work. Barker, who had previously been known by his full name "Ronald", was now referred to as the less formal form "Ronnie", after a director changed it in the credits, although he did not tell Barker. His first radio appearance was in 1956, playing Lord Russett in Floggit's. He went on to play multiple characters, but primarily the put-upon Able Seaman "Fatso" Johnson and Lieutenant-Commander Stanton in The Navy Lark, a navy based sitcom on the BBC Light Programme, which ran from 1959 to 1977, with Barker featuring in some 300 episodes.

Barker also featured in the show's radio spin-off The TV Lark, in which his character, Fatso, was now a camera operator after the main characters were drummed out of the service, and as a trainee chef in Crowther's Crowd in 1963, and had roles on Variety Playhouse. Barker soon began working in film and television. His first acting job on television was in Melvyn's show I'm Not Bothered. He appeared in various roles in the comedy series The Seven Faces of Jim from 1962, alongside Jimmy Edwards and June Whitfield, as well as parts in Bold as Brass and Foreign Affairs (as Russian embassy worker Grischa Petrovitch). This was followed with dramatic parts in A Tale of Two Cities as Jerry Cruncher in 1965 as well as a single episode role in The Avengers, in which he played Cheshire, a cat lover.

Barker had an uncredited role in the 1958 film Wonderful Things!. In 1964 he appeared in Galton & Simpson's gentle comedy The Bargee, as 'Ronnie', the illiterate cousin of Harry H. Corbett's rascally 'Hemmel Pike'. He did his first bit of on-screen 'porridge' as fellow convict to Charlie Drake in The Cracksman (1963). Other film work at that time included: Doctor in Distress (1963), Father Came Too! (1963) and A Home of Your Own (1965).

In 1966, Barker appeared in The Saint (S5, E9 "The Better Mousetrap") as the detective Alphonse. In 1966, Barker got his break with the satirical sketch series The Frost Report, having been recommended for the show by producer James Gilbert. The show starred David Frost, John Cleese and Barker's future comedy partner Ronnie Corbett, whom he had met in 1963 when Corbett was the barman at the Buckstone Club near the Haymarket Theatre. Corbett stated in his autobiography that the two had gravitated towards each other because of their similar backgrounds; neither had attended university, while many of the other cast and writers on The Frost Report had. Each episode of the show, which was performed and broadcast live, focused on a single topic and principally revolved around a continuous monologue from Frost, with sketches from Barker, Corbett and Cleese as the show went on. Barker starred alongside Cleese and Corbett in The Frost Report's best-known sketch, which satirised the British class system, with Barker representing the middle class.

After the first series, the special Frost Over England was produced, winning the Golden Rose at the Montreux Television Festival. With a second series of the show announced, Frost, recognising their potential, signed both Barker and Corbett up to his production company David Paradine Productions. As part of the deal Barker was given his own show in 1968, The Ronnie Barker Playhouse, which comprised six separate, thirty-minute plays. Barker starred in each piece as a different character. After two series of The Frost Report on the BBC, totalling 26 half-hour episodes, Frost moved to ITV after helping to set up London Weekend Television. There, Frost hosted Frost on Sunday, with Barker and Corbett following and again performing sketches on the programme. Barker began writing sketches for the programme under the pseudonym Gerald Wiley. Barker and Corbett had a greater role on the show than on The Frost Report and Corbett felt "more aware of what [they] were doing."

Barker began using the pseudonym Gerald Wiley when writing sketches because he wished the pieces to be accepted on merit and not just because he, as a star of the programme, had written them; he continued this tradition with the material he wrote later in his career, using a variety of pseudonyms. Barker brought his sketches in, claiming they had come from Wiley through Barker's agent Peter Eade, and they were very well received. To maintain the deception, Barker had criticised material he himself had submitted under the pseudonym; when a Wiley-credited sketch about a ventriloquist had been poorly received by the audience Barker told Corbett "Well, Gerald Wiley let us down there", and on another occasion, when looking at a script, "I don't understand this line. What's he getting at?" One of the first sketches he wrote was called "Doctor's Waiting Room", with the main part written for Corbett. Barker encouraged Corbett to buy the rights to the sketch and, further maintaining the myth, told him to reject Wiley's "request" for £3,000 as too expensive, before giving Corbett the sketch for free. Speculation began about Wiley's identity, with Tom Stoppard, Frank Muir, Alan Bennett and Noël Coward all rumoured. After the second series of Frost on Sunday, the cast and crew were invited to a Chinese restaurant, while Wiley said that he would reveal himself. Barker, who had told Corbett earlier in the day, stood up and announced he was Wiley, although initially nobody believed him.

In 1969, Barker wrote, produced and starred as Sir Giles Futtock in the film Futtock's End which featured little dialogue and only "grumble[s] and grunt[s]".

The Ronnie Barker Playhouse had been designed to find a successful idea for a sitcom, and the episode "Ah, There You Are" by Alun Owen, which introduced the bumbling aristocratic character Lord Rustless, was chosen. Despite Barker's success on ITV, LWT's programme controller Stella Richman opted to fire Frost's company Paradine (Frost was sacked from the LWT board) and as Barker was contracted to the company rather than the network, he lost his job, as did Corbett.

=== Move to the BBC and The Two Ronnies ===
Soon after, Barker, Corbett and Josephine Tewson performed a sketch about Henry VIII at the 1971 BAFTAs, with Barker playing Henry. The three also had to keep the audience entertained for around eight minutes as the show was stopped because of technical difficulties. Their performance at the award show impressed the BBC's Head of Light Entertainment Bill Cotton and Controller of BBC1, Paul Fox, who were sitting in the audience. Not knowing they were both essentially unemployed, although still contracted to Paradine, Cotton signed the duo up for their own show together, and a series each on their own; he later joked he "must have offered them too much money." Barker and Corbett wished to avoid being remembered primarily as a duo, and felt they could not work in the same way as a conventional double act like Morecambe and Wise, and so each maintained their solo careers as well. They each were given a one-off variety special; Barker's, called The Ronnie Barker Yearbook, featured a sketch for each month of the year although, because of time constraints, the first two had to be cut. Barker also reprised his character Lord Rustless in the sitcom His Lordship Entertains in 1972. Barker wrote all seven episodes, now using the pseudonym Jonathan Cobbald.

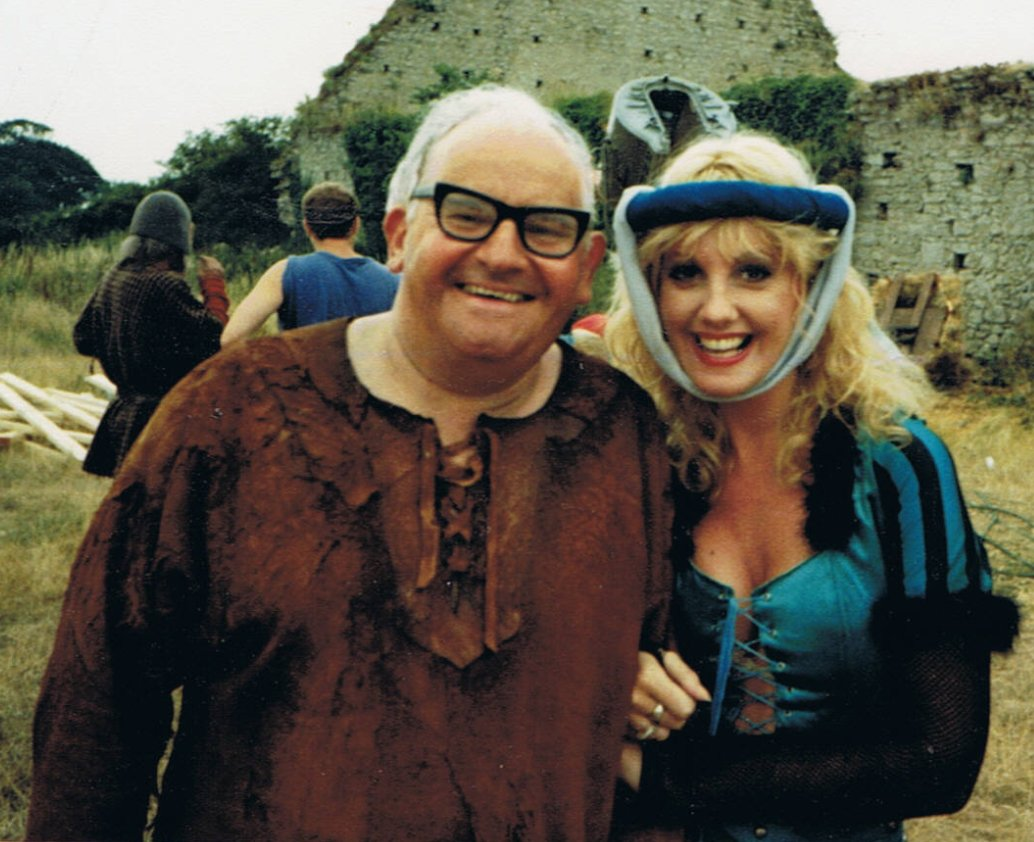
Barker during filming of The Two Ronnies (with Susie Silvey)

Their show together was The Two Ronnies, a sketch show which aired for twelve series and eight specials between 1971 and 1987, to immediate success. The show, as described by Anthony Hayward of The Independent, was "a cocktail of comedy sketches, playlets, songs and parodies, a long-winded Corbett monologue and a singing star, sandwiched between the opening and closing news summaries." The usual format consisted of many sketches between the two, an ongoing filmed serial, a solo character sketch from Barker, Corbett's monologue, a musical number, a special guest, bookended by joke news items, delivered from a desk by the two in the style of newsreaders, before ending with the catchphrase "It's good night from me – and it's good night from him."

This was a set format which was used for almost the entirety of the show's run. The end catchphrase and newsreader characters were devised because Barker found it difficult to appear as himself: Corbett explained that Barker "was a very private man, a quiet man ... He found it almost impossible to talk directly, as himself, to an audience." Each also had their own solo segments to help ensure they were not totally associated as a double act. Filming took place over four months of each year. After outdoor and serial sketches were filmed on location, the studio material was filmed on Sunday evenings at BBC Television Centre in front of a live audience; the musical finale was filmed the day before without the audience.

Barker wrote much of the show's material, roughly three-quarters, again under the name Gerald Wiley. He was heavily involved with the show's production, especially the serial. Corbett explained that Barker was a "perfectionist" and "as he wrote it Ronnie knew how he wanted every shot to look." After filming the show all day, he spent the evenings helping technician Jim Franklin to edit it. While filming on location Barker and Corbett would look through all of the potential material for the studio recording of the rest of the show's content and decide on the running order. He and Corbett always got on, with Barker noting "People refuse to believe that we don't have rows, tensions, private wars. It's a strange thing after so many years but we never have. Actually, it's even more amicable than a marriage – wedlock without the bad patches. Our sense of humour and perception of what's good and what's rubbish are uncommonly in tune." They took turns to play the parts which had the "good lines". One of the show's other writers, Barry Cryer, said: "You could write almost anything knowing these two would do it brilliantly. Because they weren't a double act; they were two men who worked together and had their own careers."

Barker's material included the sketch which came to be known as "Four Candles", airing in 1976, although in the original script it was titled "Annie Finkhouse". It sees a customer (Barker) ask for a series of items in a hardware store. The sketch's humour derives from similarities in word pronunciation, leading to confusion on the part of the store owner (Corbett). These misunderstandings include the confusion between "four candles" and "fork handles". The idea for the sketch came from the owners of a hardware shop in Hayes who wrote in to The Two Ronnies to describe some of the amusing events and misunderstandings in their store. Barker was never happy with the sketch's final line (a male assistant asking "What sort of billhooks did you want?") and changed it (to a female assistant asking "What sort of knockers were you looking for?") for the stage version of The Two Ronnies, although he was still not totally satisfied with it. Nevertheless, the sketch is considered the show's most famous one and was voted as the show's best in a TV special, while also placing fifth on Channel 4's 50 Greatest Comedy Sketches. The original script, handwritten by Barker, was sold for £48,500 at auction in 2007 after featuring in an episode of Antiques Roadshow the previous year.

The show was considered a "national institution" with audiences of between 15 and 20 million regularly tuning in to its 93 episodes. Barker won the BAFTA for Best Light Entertainment Performance in 1971 and 1977 for the show. The Two Ronnies ended with the 1987 Christmas special. In 1978 the two performed a stage version of the show at the London Palladium; lasting for three months, it followed the same format as the show, with old sketches and some new material, supported by variety acts. Barker's unease with appearing as himself in the stage show led him to create a fictionalised version of himself to play instead. A second stage series took place in 1983. Barker was reportedly offended by a sketch called "The Two Ninnies" on the BBC's Not the Nine O'Clock News, which mocked their act as being based on dated innuendo-based humour.

After a tip-off from Dick Clement and Ian La Frenais, Barker and Corbett opted to move with their families to Sydney, Australia, in 1979 for the year to exploit a tax loophole and avoid paying the year's income tax. They performed their stage show for four weeks in Sydney and a further four in Melbourne; because of their existing popularity in Australia and what Corbett termed the Australian audiences' "[comedic] soul that still related to the UK", they made no changes to the routine. Barker made no other appearances that year and spent his time writing and engaging in recreational activities. Following the show's success, Kerry Packer commissioned a six-episode TV series of The Two Ronnies in Australia for Nine Network. The show comprised material not yet shown in Australia from The Two Ronnies and new content targeted more towards an Australian audience. They returned for a second series in 1986.

Barker and Corbett also starred in the short, mostly silent, films The Picnic (1976) and By the Sea (1982), both written by Barker as "David Huggett and Larry Keith". By the Sea was Barker's tribute to the seaside-postcard humour of Donald McGill and his most "personal" work. The show was also widely syndicated in North America by PBS and CBC, and in 1980 they appeared in the short-lived NBC variety show The Big Show; the two were glad the show did not last as they objected to the use of canned laughter by the American networks.

=== Porridge, Open All Hours and other work ===
Following the success of The Two Ronnies, the BBC let Barker decide what he wanted to do. The Two Ronnies took up one third of a year to produce, allowing time for Barker and Corbett to do a solo project each. Barker opted to produce some sitcom pilots shown as part of 1973's Seven of One. Two of these pilots, Open All Hours (written by Roy Clarke) and Prisoner and Escort (written by Dick Clement and Ian La Frenais) became series. Prisoner and Escort became Porridge, airing from 1974 to 1977, with Barker starring as the cynical and cunning prisoner Norman Stanley Fletcher. Porridge was the first sitcom to take place in a prison; The Times said the show "was about what it took to survive in prison, the little day-to-day triumphs over the system that kept the prisoners sane."

The opening sequence of the programme showed Fletcher being directed to his cell, as prison doors are locked behind him, all the while the judge can be heard pronouncing judgement and sentence. The judge's voice was performed by Barker. The show became a huge success, attracting 15 million viewers and earning what the BBC described as "a chorus of critical acclaim and public adoration for what remains one of the most classic British sitcoms ever produced." The Times called "Fletcher" Barker's "finest creation," while Barker himself privately regarded the series also as the finest work of his career. He won the BAFTA for Best Light Entertainment Performance in 1975 for his performance.

In 1976, he played Friar Tuck in the film Robin and Marian, directed by Richard Lester. The same year, determined not to be remembered only as Fletcher, Barker opted to end Porridge after three series and instead focused on the second pilot Open All Hours, alongside David Jason. Barker starred as Arkwright, a money-grabbing, stuttering shopkeeper. Arkwright's stutter was not in the script; Barker was inspired to use it by Melvyn's performance and use of a stutter in a 1955 play the two performed at the Palace Theatre called Hot Water. Open All Hours aired one series in 1976 on BBC2 but was not renewed due to low ratings. As a result, Barker backtracked on his earlier decision and produced a third series of Porridge, as well as a film adaptation. It was followed by the spin-off sitcom Going Straight which focused on Fletcher after his release from prison. While not as popular as Porridge, Barker again won the BAFTA for Best Light Entertainment Performance.

Further plans for the show were ended when Barker's co-star Richard Beckinsale died of a heart attack in 1979, aged 31. With repeats of Open All Hours earning high ratings on BBC1, the BBC commissioned a further series of the show on 18 January 1980, with another two made as well as the show continued its ratings success. Both shows placed in the top ten of the 2004 poll to determine Britain's Best Sitcom; Porridge finished seventh and Open All Hours eighth.

Barker was the first actor considered for the role of Frank Spencer in Some Mothers Do 'Ave 'Em, but turned it down, so Michael Crawford was cast instead.

Barker's next sitcom, The Magnificent Evans, which was about a Welsh photographer and aired in 1984, was not successful. His final sitcom, Clarence, in which he played Clarence Sale, a removal man with failing sight, aired in 1988. Barker wrote the show himself, again using a pseudonym, this time as "Bob Ferris", the name of a character in The Likely Lads.

=== Retirement and re-appearances ===
"I had completely run out of ideas and it scared and panicked me. I was always able to write scripts but, you know, I couldn't think of a single thing to write about. It was a very weird sensation. I had seen friends of mine start burning out. No one wants to see a 70-year-old on television who can't remember his lines. And also I had lost interest."

— Barker on his decision to retire

In 1987, before Clarence aired and after rejecting Hall's offer of the part of Falstaff in a Royal National Theatre production of Henry IV, Part 1 & 2, Barker retired from show business, aged 58, "at the height of his fame", citing a decline in his own writing quality, lack of ambition and ideas, and a desire to go out on top so as not to damage his legacy, as well as concerns about the state of his heart. He had decided to retire in 1985 but his decision was kept secret for two years, Corbett being the only one knowing about it. He made his decision public on an appearance on the chat show Wogan.

Once retired from acting, Barker opened and ran an antiques shop called The Emporium in Chipping Norton, Oxfordshire, and resisted all calls to come out of retirement from then onwards. He joked: "I lose money every week, but it's a hobby. It's cheaper than skiing and safer at my age." Because of its unprofitability, the shop was sold after ten years. He wrote his autobiography, Dancing in the Moonlight: My Early Years on Stage, in 1993 and released All I Ever Wrote, his complete scripts, in 1999. He wrote the play Mum (initially as "Richard Mervyn", but as the play was opening, consenting to use his own name) for his daughter Charlotte in 1998. The play was performed at The King's Head Theatre, but garnered a negative response, with Barker stating it got "the worst notices of any play in the history of the theatre."

Just over a decade after retiring, Barker was persuaded to make occasional appearances on television again. In 1997, he appeared with Corbett at the Royal Command Performance, driving on stage on a motorcycle combination as the Two Fat Ladies, and in 1999 he was reunited with Corbett for Two Ronnies Night on BBC One, and the following year for A Tribute to the Two Ronnies. In 2002, director Richard Loncraine persuaded Barker to appear as Winston Churchill's butler David Inches in the BBC-HBO drama The Gathering Storm and then cast him in the larger role of the General in the TV film My House in Umbria in 2003, alongside Maggie Smith (whom Barker had advised, early in their careers, to give up acting as he felt she would not be a success). In the same year, he briefly reprised his role as Norman Stanley Fletcher in the spoof documentary Life Beyond the Box.

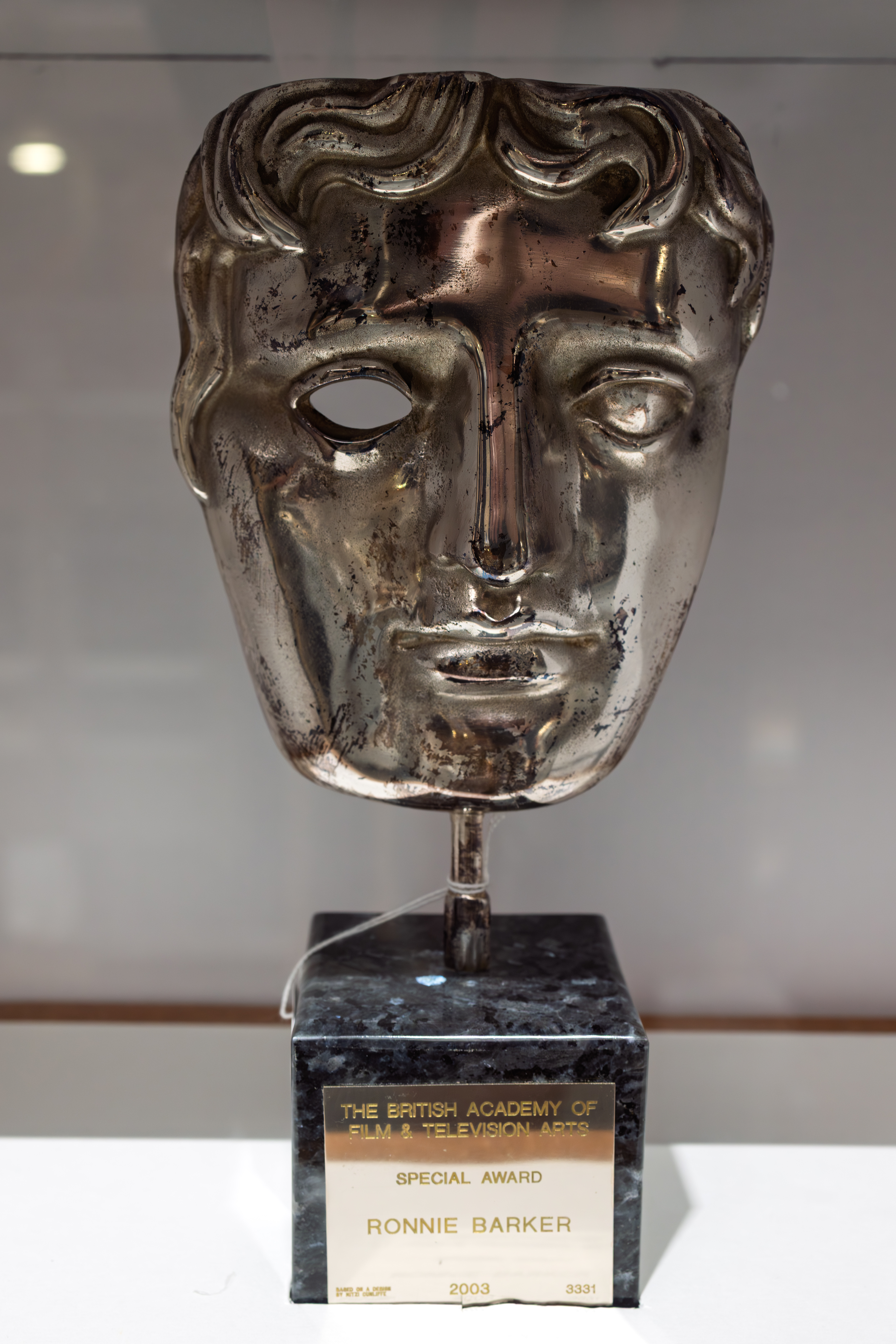
Barker's BAFTA lifetime achievement award

Barker received several lifetime achievement awards. He won the Royal Television Society's award for Outstanding Creative Achievement in 1975. Alec Guinness presented him with a lifetime achievement honour at the inaugural British Comedy Awards in 1990, while he received another such honour at the BBC Centenary Programme in 1996. In 2004, he was given a special BAFTA lifetime achievement award at Ronnie Barker: A BAFTA Tribute, a televised celebratory tribute evening. In 2005, he and Corbett were part of the first 100 people given stars on London's Avenue of Stars. Previous awards included the Variety Club of Great Britain Award in 1969, 1974 and 1980, the Radio Industry Club Award in 1973, 1974, 1977 and 1981.

Following the success of Ronnie Barker: A BAFTA Tribute, Barker wanted to return The Two Ronnies to television and the BBC commissioned The Two Ronnies Sketchbook, a clip show of their best sketches along with newly recorded introductions. These were recorded in one day because of Barker's declining health and aired in 2005. The project, when announced, met with "some derision among the professional critics", but after the first episode drew eight million viewers, they had to "eat their words". The final special, and Barker's final appearance on television – The Two Ronnies Christmas Sketchbook – was recorded in July 2005 as a result of Barker's failing health and aired posthumously in December.

== Acting and writing style ==
"I'll tell you who my favourite performer is. Ronnie Barker. Surprised? You shouldn't be. He's really great."

— Alec Guinness

Barker became a comic actor in his theatre days, noting "I think it's better to make people laugh than cry." He has been described by The Times as "not a comedian, [but] an actor with a talent for comedy," who "slipped into characters with apparent ease." Barker felt he was funny only in character. The BBC wrote of him: "Able to deliver the great tongue-twisting speeches required of his characters, Barker pronounced himself 'completely boring' without a script." Peter Hall spoke of Barker's skills as a dramatic actor, calling him "the great actor we lost" and lamented that Barker was unable to take a role in one of his Shakespearean productions. Barker preferred comedy, and felt it was "as good and as important as serious work" and he was not "dumbing down" by doing it. Actor Gene Wilder compared him to Charlie Chaplin in saying "no matter how farcical [his performance] was ... there was always an element of reality to what he did." Corbett praised Barker's skill at playing serious authority figures saying absurd things, using Barker's verbal dexterity and energetic performances.

The Times stated that Barker's writing style was "based on precise scripts and perfect timing." It often involved playing with language, including humour involving such linguistic items as spoonerisms and double entendres. Dennis Baker of The Guardian wrote that Barker "preferred innuendo over the crudely explicit, a restraint that demanded some imagination from the audience and was the essence of his comedy." Corbett said he had "a mastery of the English language".

In private, Barker annotated a copy of A Book of Nonsense by Edward Lear, penning punch lines of his own for each limerick. On the title page he wrote, "There was an old fossil named Lear, Whose verses were boring and drear. His last lines were worst – just the same as the first! So I've tried to improve on them here." The annotated copy of Lear's book, signed and dated November 2001, was auctioned in 2012.

== Personal life ==
Barker met Joy Tubb in Cambridge while she was a stage manager for two plays he was in. They married nine months later in July 1957 and had three children: two sons, Larry (born 1959) and Adam (born 1968), and one daughter, Charlotte (born 1962), who became an actress. Larry, a leading advertising creative director, was named after Barker's idol Laurence Olivier. Adam Barker became an actor, but was jailed for twelve months in 2012 on twenty counts of making indecent images of children, having evaded police for eight years; he was not present at his father's funeral. The family lived in Pinner for many years, and subsequently in a converted mill in Dean, Oxfordshire. According to Corbett, Barker was "first and foremost a family man". Joy died in January 2011, aged 78.

Barker was appointed an OBE in 1978. He was an avid collector of antiques, books and posters and amassed a collection of over 53,000 postcards. He produced several compilation books of them, including Ronnie Barker's Book of Bathing Beauties, A Pennyworth of Art, and Sauce. Barker rarely appeared in public, and when he did, it was almost always in character. He once said, "I've always known I haven't a personality of my own, I have to be someone else to be happy. That's why I became an actor, I suppose."

Barker was a heavy smoker until 1972, when he gave up the habit after having a pre-cancerous growth removed from his throat; he took to drinking wine and using placebo cigarettes to maintain his concentration and help him sleep. He underwent a heart bypass in 1996 and survived a pulmonary embolism the following year.

== Death ==
Barker opted not to have heart valve replacement surgery, and his health rapidly declined after the recording of The Two Ronnies Christmas Sketchbook. He died of heart failure at the Katherine House hospice in Adderbury, Oxfordshire, on 3 October 2005, aged 76, with his wife by his side. News of his death made top billing on television news bulletins.

Barker's body was cremated at a private humanist funeral at Banbury Crematorium, which was attended only by family and close friends. A public memorial service for Barker was held on 3 March 2006 at Westminster Abbey, with some 2,000 people in attendance. Ronnie Corbett, Richard Briers, Josephine Tewson, Michael Grade, and Peter Kay all read at the service, while others in attendance included David Jason, Stephen Fry, Michael Palin, Leslie Phillips, Lenny Henry, Dawn French, June Whitfield and David Frost. A recording of Barker's rhyming slang sermon from The Two Ronnies was played, and while the cross was in procession in the aisle of the abbey, it was accompanied by four candles instead of the usual two, in reference to the Four Candles sketch. Barker was the third comedy professional to be given a memorial at Westminster Abbey, after Joyce Grenfell and Les Dawson.

=== Legacy ===
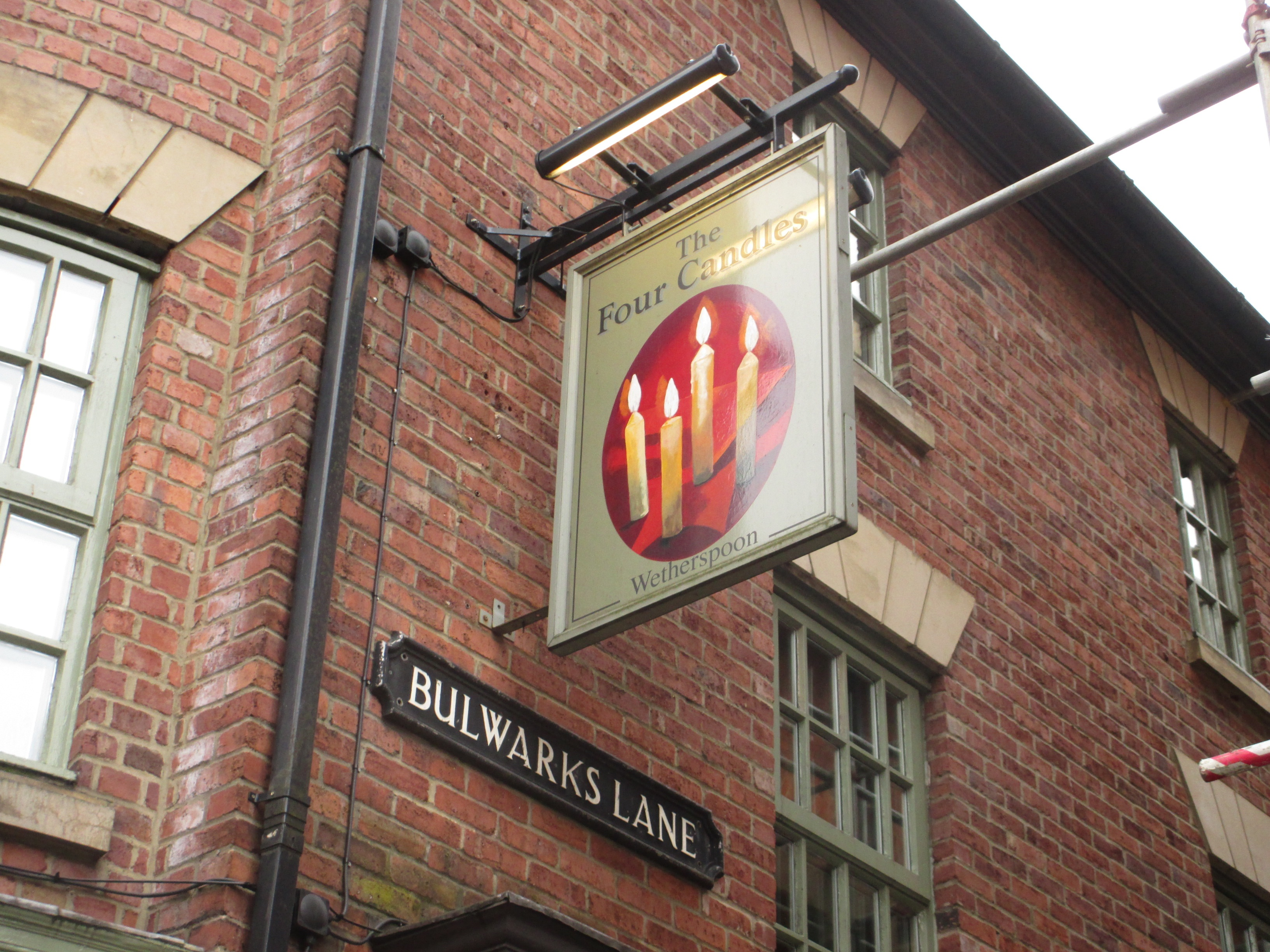
The sign of the Four Candles, a Wetherspoons pub in Oxford named after Barker's comedy sketch.

Following Barker's death, the Writer of the Year Award at the British Comedy Awards was renamed in his honour. In 2005, he was voted as the 16th-greatest comedy act ever by fellow comedians and comedy insiders, in a poll to find The Comedians' Comedian.

The BBC described him as "one of the leading figures of British television comedy", and "much loved and admired". The Independent called him "a master of television sitcom". The Guardian said he was "much loved ... both as an actor and a writer he was recognised as a master of pyrotechnic puns, surreal behaviour in public and private places, and crackling cross-chat". It concluded that "it says much about the decline of the British television industry that Ronnie Barker, one of its most creative comic talents, should have turned his back on it long before he died at the age of 76." In a eulogy for Barker, the Reverend Robert Wright stated that he was "undoubtedly one of the very greatest television comedy actors" and that "as a performer he made comedy look effortlessly funny".

In 2006, Barker's stage play Mum was adapted and directed by Neil Cargill for BBC Radio 4, and broadcast as an Afternoon Play, starring Maxine Peake and Sam Kelly.

A bronze statue of Barker, sculpted by Martin Jennings and showing him in character as Norman Stanley Fletcher, was unveiled at the entrance of the Aylesbury Waterside Theatre in September 2010 by his widow Joy, David Jason and Ronnie Corbett.

In 2015, the Ronnie Barker Comedy Lecture (also referred to as The Ronnie Barker Talk) was commissioned by the BBC at the instigation of the head of comedy commissioning, Shane Allen. The first lecture was given in August 2017 by Ben Elton. Elton's lecture focused on the future of the British sitcom.
