= Rodney Bewes =

British actor (1937–2017)

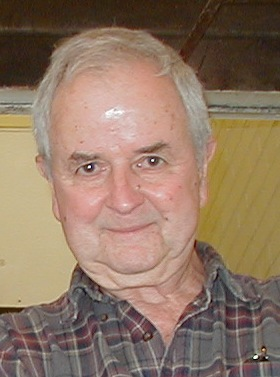
- Rodney Bewes in 2004
- Born: 27 November 1937; Bingley, West Riding of Yorkshire, England
- Died: 21 November 2017 (aged 79); Cadgwith, Cornwall, England
- Occupations: Actor; performer; scriptwriter
- Years active: 1952–2015
- Spouses: Sylvia N. Tebbitt (m. 1963, divorced) Daphne Black (m. 1973; died 2015)
- Children: 4

Rodney Bewes (27 November 1937 – 21 November 2017) was an English television actor and writer who portrayed Bob Ferris in the BBC television sitcom The Likely Lads (1964–66) and its colour sequel Whatever Happened to the Likely Lads? (1973–74). Bewes' later career was of a much lower profile, but he continued to work as a stage actor.

== Early life ==
Bewes was born in Bingley in the West Riding of Yorkshire, to Horace, an Eastern Electricity Board showroom clerk, and Bessie, who was a teacher of children with learning difficulties. His family lived for a few years in the Crossflatts district of Bingley, before they moved to Luton, where he attended Stopsley Secondary School. Because of his early ill-health (he suffered from asthma and bronchitis), one of the reasons the family moved, his mother tended to keep him off school. His illness receded, and the family eventually returned to the north.

Having seen an advertisement in the Daily Herald, Bewes auditioned for the title role in Billy Bunter of Greyfriars School just before he turned 13, and was in the last two short-listed for the role, losing to Gerald Campion. However, he did appear in two early television roles for the BBC, Mystery at Mountcliffe Chase and The Pickwick Papers (both 1952). At 14, he moved to London to attend RADA's preparatory school.

After two years of national service in the RAF, Bewes attended RADA. He was working nights in hotels, doing the washing-up, to finance his studies at RADA during the day, and hence was frequently to be found asleep in class. He was expelled during his final year.

== Early career ==
Bewes began appearing in repertory theatre and obtained parts in the television drama series Dixon of Dock Green (1962) and Z-Cars (1963). He also appeared in the film version of Billy Liar (1963) as Arthur Crabtree, alongside his close friend Tom Courtenay. The two men shared a flat at the time; Bewes, having seen Courtenay's script, independently and successfully approached the casting director for the part. The following year his Northern working-class background and natural Northern accent stood him in good stead, landing him the role of Bob Ferris in The Likely Lads (1964–66) after Dick Clement and Ian La Frenais had seen him in Billy Liar.

In The Likely Lads, Ferris was the more ambitious of two Newcastle factory workers, with Terry Collier (James Bolam) being his lazy and more cynical friend. The series, at first broadcast on the newly launched BBC2, proved successful both critically and in the ratings when it was shown on the BBC1 and ran for three series. Between his two spells as a 'Likely Lad', Bewes also appeared in Man in a Suitcase (1967), Father, Dear Father (1968) and as "Mr Rodney" on The Basil Brush Show (1968–69). He starred in his own ITV sitcom Dear Mother...Love Albert (later known as Albert!, 1969–72), which he created and co-wrote with Derrick Goodwin.

Bewes appeared in the 1969 theatrical production of She Stoops to Conquer as Tony Lumpkin. He also appeared in the film Spring and Port Wine (1970) which starred James Mason, and played the Knave of Hearts in Alice's Adventures in Wonderland (1972). Bewes and Bolam reunited for the sequel that continued the Bob and Terry saga, Whatever Happened to the Likely Lads? (1973–74). It ran for two series of 13 episodes, followed by a Christmas special in 1974. The original series was adapted for radio (1967–68) as was the sequel (1975), and a cinema spin-off (The Likely Lads, 1976) also followed.

Bewes's later film roles included Jabberwocky (1977), Unidentified Flying Oddball (1979) and The Wildcats of St Trinian's (1980). Although better known for his comedy and light entertainment roles, viewers were given an opportunity to see Bewes's serious acting ability in a made-for-TV film adaptation of John Ford's 17th century play, 'Tis Pity She's a Whore (1980). Despite a guest role in the Doctor Who serial Resurrection of the Daleks in 1984, his television career had largely ended by the mid-1980s.

== Later career ==
On the West End stage, Bewes appeared in the play Middle-Age Spread and Funny Money, a farce by Ray Cooney.

In 1981, he starred in "A Very Private Man" on BBC Radio.

Bewes remained active as a stage performer in the 1990s and later with one-man versions of Three Men in a Boat and Diary of a Nobody, both of which shows he toured extensively in the UK.

Bewes final appearance on television was in 2009 when he played retired bank manager Edward Walton in the Heartbeat episode Ties That Bind.

In July 2013, he was The Marshal (Philippe Pétain) in the Southwark Playhouse production of Peter Ustinov's The Moment of Truth. He was back in Edinburgh again in 2015 for an autobiographical show, An Audience with Rodney Bewes... Who?

Bewes's autobiography, A Likely Story, was published in September 2005.

== Relationship with James Bolam ==
In his autobiography, and on Michael Parkinson's BBC Radio 2 show in 2005, Bewes stated that his Likely Lads co-star James Bolam had not spoken to him for the past 30 years. It had been assumed for years that Bolam and Bewes were friends off-screen as well as on; a pretence they kept up because their public expected it. However, they had comprehensively fallen out when Bewes indiscreetly related a personal anecdote about Bolam in a 1976 press interview, and they had not spoken since. Bewes blamed Bolam's fear of having his privacy invaded, and of being eternally typecast, leading to his refusing to allow repeats of The Likely Lads. The final breach, said Bewes, occurred when, having told an anecdote about the birth of his own triplets, he followed on with a story of how Bolam's wife, actress Susan Jameson, had told him she was pregnant while he was driving, and he almost crashed the car. Bewes repeated this story, thinking it was already public knowledge; but then, on realising he might have crossed a line, phoned Bolam to forewarn him of the article, and got a frosty reaction. "There was this dreadful silence. He put the phone down. I called him back, he didn't answer. He hasn't spoken to me since." It was reported that Bolam had never got on that well with Bewes, due to their different personalities.

In 2010, Bewes also claimed his former co-star had refused to allow The Likely Lads to be repeated on network television, preventing him from earning anything from the repeats; "He must be very wealthy; me, I've just got an overdraft and a mortgage". Shortly before he died, in an interview with the Daily Mirror, Bewes once more lamented the loss of his friendship with Bolam. Bolam, however, denied such a rift ever existed, stating after Bewes's death that they "didn't talk for 40 years because of their busy schedules rather than resentment", and he had "nothing but fond memories" of Bewes. Bolam also denied he had the ability to block repeats of the TV series.

== Death ==
Bewes died on 21 November 2017, six days before his 80th birthday, in his seaside home at Cadgwith in south Cornwall. He is survived by a daughter and three sons.

== Filmography ==
=== Film ===
Year	Title	Role	Notes
1962	A Prize of Arms	Private Maynard	Uncredited
1962	We Joined the Navy	Recruitment interviewee	Uncredited
1963	Heavens Above!	Milkfloat driver	Uncredited
1963	Billy Liar	Arthur Crabtree	
1964	The Chase	George	TV film
1965	San Ferry Ann	Lover Boy	
1968	Decline and Fall... of a Birdwatcher	Arthur Potts	
1969	All Star Comedy Carnival	Albert Courtnay	TV film
1970	Spring and Port Wine	Harold Crompton	
1972	Alice's Adventures in Wonderland	Knave of Hearts	
1973	The Three Musketeers	Spy	
1975	Jonah and the Whale	Jonah	TV film
1976	The Likely Lads	Bob Ferris	
1977	Jabberwocky	The Other Squire	
1979	Saint Jack	Smale	
1979	Unidentified Flying Oddball	Clarence	
1980	'Tis Pity She's a Whore	Bergetto	TV film
1980	The Wildcats of St Trinian's	Peregrine Butters	
1982	East Lynne	Raymond Vane	TV film
1993	Come Snow, Come Blow		TV film

=== Television ===
Year	Title	Role	Notes
1952	Mystery at Mountcliffe Chase	Jeremy Nicholls	TV short
1952	The Pickwick Papers	Joe	2 episodes
1961	ITV Playhouse	Signals operator	Episode: "Private Potter"
1962	Dixon of Dock Green	PC Screen	Episode: "An Escort for Harry"
1962	Emergency Ward 10	Roger Mayne	1 episode
1962	Armchair Theatre	Barman	Episode: "The Irish Boys"
1963	Z-Cars	Sammy	Episode: "The Main Chance"
1963	Love Story	Smith	Episode: "The Wedding of Smith Seven-Nine"
1963	Sierra Nine	Tom Batley	Episode: "The Q-Radiation"
1963	The Plane Makers	Tim Ormiston	Episode: "Any More for the Skylark?"
1963	First Night	Sam Towler	Episode: "The Road"
1963	First Night	Pots	Episode: "Sticks"
1963	Drama 61-67	Peter Morton	Episode: "Loop"
1964	Drama 61-67	Trooper Tanner	Episode: "Across the Border"
1964	Cluff	Jack Carson	Episode: "The Screeching Cat"
1964	Six	George	Episode: "The Chase"
1964	Christmas Night with the Stars	Bob Ferris	1 episode
1964-1966	The Likely Lads	Bob Ferris	Series regular
1966	Armchair Theatre	Neville Starkey	Episode: "The Night Before the Morning After"
1966-1982	Jackanory	Storyteller	Series regular
1967	Hicks and Stokes	Billy Hicks	TV short
1967	Man in a Suitcase	Tim Gormond	Episode: "The Bridge"
1968	Virgin of the Secret Service	Rajah of Chundrapore	Episode: "The Rajah and the Suffragette"
1968	The Basil Brush Show	Mr. Rodney	Series regular
1968	Father, Dear Father	Cyril	Episode: "It Won't Be a Stylish Marriage"
1969-1972	Dear Mother...Love Albert	Albert Courtnay	Series regular
1971	Shirley's World	Ralph	Episode: "A Girl Like You"
1973-1974	Whatever Happened to the Likely Lads?	Bob Ferris	Series regular
1974	Whodunnit?	Panellist	Episode: "Goodbye Sarge"
1975	Churchill's People	Bob Pott	Episode: "Mother India"
1980	Just Liz	Reg Last	Series regular
1982	Crown Court	Alistair Crichton	Episode: "Peanuts"
1982	BBC Play of the Month	Constable	Episode: "The Critic"
1984	Doctor Who	Stien	Episode: "Resurrection of the Daleks"
1984	The Other 'Arf	Sam Hardwicke	Episode: "Drastic Action"
1985	Summer Season	George	Episode: "Glamour Night"
1986	Hudson Frontier	Lord Herne	Mini-series
1987	The Adventures of a Lady	Lord Herne	Mini-series
1993	Spender	Norman Ellerson	Episode: "Kid"
2002	A Tribute to The Likely Lads	News vendor	TV short, cameo role
2004	Revolver	Jimmy Charles	1 episode
2009	Heartbeat	Edward Walton	Episode: "Ties That Bind"
