= Sheila Fearn =

British actress (born 1940)

- Born: 3 October 1940 (age 85); Leicester, England
- Occupation: Actress
- Years active: 1957–1988

Sheila Fearn (born 3 October 1940) is an English retired actress best known for playing Audrey, the sister of Terry Collier in BBC situation comedies The Likely Lads and Whatever Happened to the Likely Lads?, and also as Anne Fourmile, the next door neighbour in the Thames Television sitcom George and Mildred.

== Early life ==
Fearn attended Gateway Girls' Grammar School on Elbow Lane in Leicester, which closed in 1960.

== Career ==
On film, Fearn appeared in Billy Liar (1963), Catch Us If You Can (1965) and Time Bandits (1981), as well as the film versions of both The Likely Lads (1976) and George and Mildred (1980). Fearn's other television credits include Adam Adamant Lives!, Paul Temple, Crown Court, East of Ipswich by Michael Palin, Emergency Ward 10, Thriller (1 episode, 1974), Walter, Z-Cars and The Avengers. She also played Freddie, a girlfriend of Ronnie Corbett's character Timothy, in Sorry! She also appeared many times with The Scaffold.

Likely Lads writer Ian La Frenais said of her "she was sexy and funny and she knew John Lennon. Sheila always found time for everyone, and I now think of her and Audrey with great affection".

== Filmography ==
Year	Title	Role	Notes
1963	Coronation Street	Gloria Dee	2 episodes
1963	Billy Liar	Telephonist	Uncredited
1963–64	Emergency Ward 10	Nurse Elizabeth Benskin	7 episodes
1964	A Hard Day's Night	Makeup-lady	Uncredited
1964–66	The Likely Lads	Audrey Collier	9 episodes
1965–76	Z-Cars	Greer Hatton / Gwen Newcombe / Josie Benson / Lucy Morrison	5 episodes
1965	The Wednesday Play	Ann Johnson	Episode: "Wear a Very Big Hat"
1965	Catch Us If You Can	Shirley	Uncredited
1965	Dixon of Dock Green	Pat Rogers	Episode: "The Intruders"
1965–66	The Big Spender	Polly	6 episodes
1966	Weavers Green	Sue Patterson	3 episodes
1966	Adam Adamant Lives!	Susie	Episode: "Death Has a Thousand Faces"
1966	Drama 61-67	Loretta Mays	Episode: "Drama '66: A Hero of Modern Industry"
1967	Armchair Theatre	Roma	Episode: "A World of Time"
1967	No Hiding Place	Jennifer Hemlyn	Episode: "A Murder Is a Murder"
1967	The Beverly Hillbillies	Young lady	Episode: "Clampett Castle"
1967	The Avengers	Jenny	Episode: "Murdersville"
1968	Public Eye	Valerie Kitson	Episode: "If This Is Lucky, I'd Rather Be Jonah"
1968	The Expert	Jean Chambers	Episode: "Nice Day"
1969	Barrister at Law	Catherine Brent	TV movie
1969	Special Branch	Det. Sgt. Sarah Gifford	Episode: "The Children of Delight"
1969	Hadleigh	Shirley Spence	Episode: "For Those in Peril"
1970	Paul Temple	Leda Bailey	Episode: "The Man from the Sea"
1971	Trial	Gwen Chappell	Episode: "Good People"
1972	Thirty-Minute Theatre	Audrey	Episode: "An Arrow for Little Audrey"
1972	New Scotland Yard	Joan Prentice	Episode: "And When You're Wrong"
1972–74	Whatever Happened to the Likely Lads?	Audrey Collier	11 episodes
1973	ITV Sunday Night Theatre	Barbara	11 episodes
1973	Love Story	Sally	Episode: "Walter"
1974	Thriller	Prudence Claire	Episode: "Sign It Death"
1975	Spy Trap	Mrs. Church	Episode: "A Nice Place to Live"
1975	Crown Court	Mrs. Deborah Todd	Episode: "A Nice Place to Live"
1976	The Likely Lads	Audrey Collier	
1976–80	George and Mildred	Ann Fourmile	38 episodes
1977–78	The Flockton Flyer	Kathy Carter	6 episodes
1978	Parables	Carol Wibberley	Episode: "Neighbours"
1980	George and Mildred	Ann Fourmile	
1981	Time Bandits	Kevin's mother	
1982	Sorry!	Freddie	3 episodes
1987	Screen Two	Mrs Hargreaves	Episode: "East of Ipswich"
1988	News at Twelve	Iris Swindley	6 episodes, (final appearance)
