= Audrey Collier =

Fictional character

- The Likely Lads, Whatever Happened to the Likely Lads, The Likely Lads (film) character
- Portrayed by: Sheila Fearn

In-universe information
- Gender: Female
- Occupation: Housewife
- Family: Cyril Collier (father); Edith Collier (mother)
- Spouse: Ernie (m. 1968)
- Children: Wayne; Fleur
- Relatives: Terry Collier (brother); Linda Collier (sister)
- Nationality: British

Audrey Collier is a character in the television series The Likely Lads, Whatever Happened to the Likely Lads and the film adaptation of The Likely Lads. She is portrayed by Sheila Fearn throughout the series.

== Character ==
Audrey is the elder sister of Terry Collier. In The Likely Lads she lives with her parents and Terry. Terry and her are shown to bicker over trivial differences in a childish manner, much to the dismay of their mother, Edith.

Audrey returns in Whatever Happened to the Likely Lads, where she is shown to be married with children and like Bob she has left the area where she grew up and now lives on a new estate. Her marriage to Ernie (Ronald Lacey) is portrayed to be largely unhappy, by statements made by Audrey such as I was going to leave Ernie but I couldn't find the time. In the film their marriage does not seem to have improved.

Like Thelma, Audrey is often a source of disapproval for Terry and Bob. Audrey is supportive of Bob and sees her brother as a bad influence on his marriage. Like Thelma, Audrey is usually trying to get rid of Terry and throughout the film she tries to persuade him to emigrate, something she is almost successful in. Audrey is an interfering character who tries to involve herself in Bob's marital problems at every opportunity and does not hesitate to pass any problems they have around her friends as gossip.
