= Sezen =

Sezen (Turkish pronunciation: [seˈzen]) is a Turkish given name and surname. Notable people with the name include:

- Melis Sezen (born 1997), Turkish actress
- Merih Sezen (1919–2011), Turkish Olympic fencer
- Sezen Aksu (born 1954), Turkish pop music singer, songwriter and producer
- Sezen Djouma (born 2002), Turkish-born child actor
- Sezen Cumhur Önal (born 1938), Turkish television presenter
