= Whatever Happened to the Likely Lads? =

British TV sitcom (1973–1974)

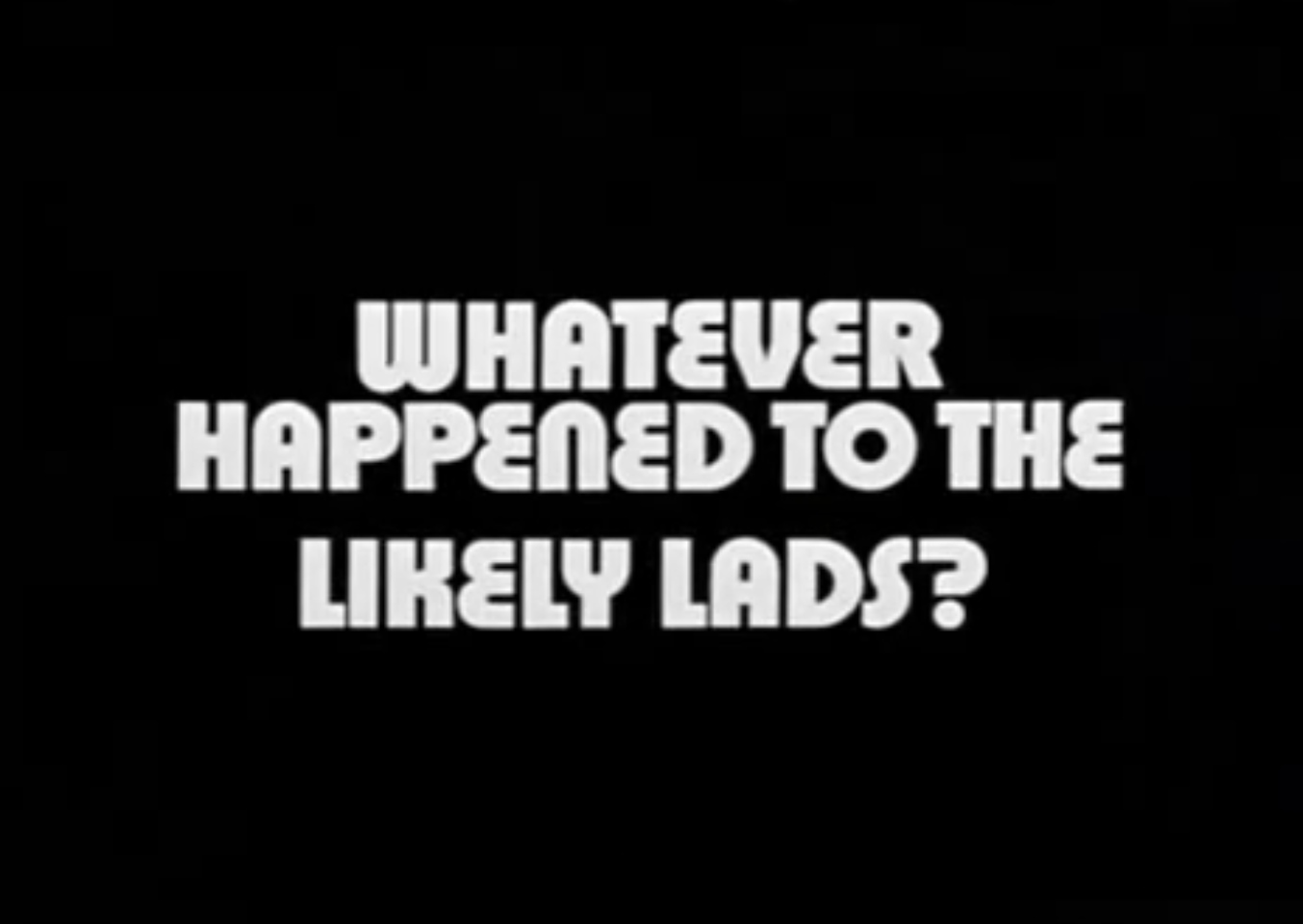
- Series title card
- Starring: James Bolam; Rodney Bewes; Brigit Forsyth; Sheila Fearn
- Theme music composer: Mike Hugg; Ian La Frenais
- Opening theme: "Whatever Happened to You?"
- Ending theme: "Whatever Happened to You?"
- Country of origin: United Kingdom
- Original language: English
- No. of series: 2
- No. of episodes: 27

Production
- Producers: James Gilbert; Bernard Thompson
- Running time: 30 minutes (series); 45 minutes (special)

Original release
- Network: BBC1
- Release: 9 January 1973 – 24 December 1974

Whatever Happened to the Likely Lads? is a British sitcom which was broadcast on BBC1 between 9 January 1973 and 9 April 1974. It was the colour sequel to the mid-1960s sitcom The Likely Lads. Like its predecessor, it was created and written by Dick Clement and Ian La Frenais, and starred Rodney Bewes and James Bolam. There were twenty-six television episodes over two series, and a subsequent forty-five-minute Christmas special was aired on 24 December 1974. The show won the BAFTA Television Award for Best Situation Comedy in 1974.

The cast was reunited in 1975 for a BBC radio adaptation of series one, transmitted on Radio 4 from July to October that year. A feature film spin-off was made in 1976. Around the time of its release, Bewes and Bolam fell out over a misunderstanding involving the press, and never spoke again. This long-suspected feud was recounted by Bewes in his autobiography in 2005. Bolam was consistently reluctant to talk about the show, and vetoed any attempt to revive his character. Following Bewes's death in November 2017, Bolam maintained there was never any rift.

== Plot ==
Set in Newcastle upon Tyne in north-east England, the show follows the friendship, resumed after five years apart, of two working-class young men, Bob Ferris (Rodney Bewes) and Terry Collier (James Bolam). The word "likely" in the title referred, in the 1960s series, to those showing promise, but also to those likely to get up to well-meaning mischief. The humour was based on the tension between Terry's firmly working-class outlook and Bob's aspirations to join the middle class, through his new white-collar job, suburban home and impending marriage to the prissy librarian Thelma Chambers (Brigit Forsyth).

Since the ending of the original series in 1966, Bob has left factory life behind and now works for his future father-in-law's construction firm, something which makes him even more desperate to curry favour with Thelma and her family. At Thelma's urging, Bob is also joining sports clubs and attending dinner parties, which Terry views as Bob aspiring to join the middle class. This results in Terry viewing Bob as a class traitor and believing his own army experience and solid working-class ethos gives him moral superiority. To a considerable degree the comedy is built on class warfare. Whereas Bob, Thelma and Terry's sister Audrey have adapted to the various changes, Terry's failure to adjust to the changes that have occurred during his five years in the army result in him being left behind, a relic of the attitudes of the mid-1960s.

Bob and Terry are arrested in the episode "One for the Road".

As implied in the lyrics to the programme's theme song, the 1970s series plays on both lads' feelings of nostalgia for the lost days of their reckless youth. Both of them are depressed by the demolition of so many of the landmarks of their childhood, though Bob, who works for a construction firm, sometimes sees it as progress. Bob has also bought his own house on a new estate, further distancing him from his and Terry's pasts. Reflecting the distinctions now separating the two young men, the opening credits show Terry waiting for a bus in the older and more industrial parts of the city, with Bob seen outside his new home with his own car in the modern surroundings of the Elm Lodge housing estate.

The conflict between what Bob has become, and what he sees himself as, makes him impulsively inclined to follow the lead set by the more headstrong Terry, who leads them recklessly into one scrape after another. Bob usually blames his drinking, poor diet and reckless behaviour on Terry, a view with which Audrey and Thelma only too willingly agree. This may be true in part, but Bob needs little persuasion to stay out drinking with Terry or to behave accordingly. Bob does not actually move into his new house until after his wedding to Thelma due to fears of being judged by his new neighbours (although, in the final episode of the first series, both Bob and Thelma make it clear they have an active sex life), and for the first series lives with his mother. Terry lives with his parents (his father is never seen) in a 19th-century terrace, which he claims has far more character than Bob's new house, where "the only thing that tells you apart from your neighbours is the colour of your curtains".

Many of the thirteen episodes of the first series, aired in 1973, have a loose narrative thread. The early episodes focus on Terry's return to civilian life following his discharge from the army, whereas later episodes focus on the planning for Bob and Thelma's wedding. The second series, aired the following year, opens with a focus on the growing romance between Terry and Thelma's sister Susan, partially continued from the first series. A four-episode storyline concerning Bob and Thelma's brief separation begins near the later half of the series, and there are also several self-contained episodes.

== Theme song ==
The show's theme song, "Whatever Happened to You", was written by Mike Hugg (of Manfred Mann) and La Frenais and performed by Hugg's session band, with session singer Tony Rivers supplying the lead vocals; released as a single under the name Highly Likely, the song reached number 35 in the UK Singles Chart in 1973. Hugg also wrote the theme tune to the spin-off 1976 feature film, Remember When.

== Changes in format and style from The Likely Lads ==
Although Whatever Happened to the Likely Lads? was a continuation of the earlier series and featured many of the same characters, the style and format had changed. Unlike the original show, Whatever Happened to the Likely Lads? was made in colour. Also, The Likely Lads had been quite "stagey" (in the theatrical sense) in its format, being studio-bound with little in the way of location filming. The 1970s series made extensive use of location filming in and around the north-east. In terms of humour, the two shows are very different. The Likely Lads had been a broad comedy, full of jokes and obvious gags, whereas Whatever Happened to the Likely Lads? used much subtler humour, derived from the dialogue and characterisation, often interspersed with sentimentality and even touches of pathos as the lads mourned or reflected on their lost past. Nostalgia was a strong thread running through the show. The lads frequently did ask each other the question in the show's title, "Whatever happened to us?", particularly during their more mellow moments in the pub.

== Cast ==
=== Regular cast ===
- James Bolam as Terry Collier
- Rodney Bewes as Bob Ferris
- Brigit Forsyth as Thelma Chambers (later Ferris), Bob's fiancée, whom he marries at the end of series 1
- Sheila Fearn as Audrey Collier, married name unknown, Terry's elder sister.

=== Recurring cast ===
- Bill Owen as George Chambers, Thelma's father
- Joan Hickson (Series 1) and Noel Dyson (Series 2) as Mrs Chambers, Thelma's mother
- Anita Carey as Susan Chambers, Thelma's sister, who lives in Toronto, Canada, with her accountant fiancé Peter
- Olive Milbourne as Edith Collier, mother of Terry, Audrey and Linda
- Robert Gillespie, police officer
- Barbara Ogilvie as Alice Ferris, Bob's mother
- Ronald Lacey as Ernie, Audrey's husband
- Elizabeth Lax as Wendy, Bob's secretary
- Stephanie Turner as Mary, Terry's friend in Birthday Boy
- Christopher Biggins as "Podge" Rowley, Bob and Terry's friend
- Julian Holloway as Alan Boyle, Bob's friend; originally from Surrey
- Juliet Aykroyd as Anthea, Thelma's assistant at the library

=== Unseen characters ===
- Cyril Collier, Terry's and Audrey's father, who appeared in the 1960s series
- Leslie Ferris, Bob's father (in the 1960s series, it was established that Bob's father is deceased)
- Linda Collier, Terry's and Audrey's sister
- Frank Clark, Bob's original choice for best man
- Nigel "Little Hutch" Hutchinson, a sex-mad pal who always has a racing tip for Terry
- Norma Braithwaite, a childhood schoolfriend of Thelma who passed on Bob's letters of apology to her
- Cloughie, a workmate of Bob and Terry from the 1960s series. It is mentioned in passing that he now runs a newsagent's shop.
- Jutta Baumgarten, Terry's estranged West German wife. She was due to appear in the last episode of Series 1, played by April Walker, but after filming her first scene, the writers decided against having both male characters married and released Walker from her contract. Despite this, Walker remains on the end credits despite not appearing in the episode.
- Maurice "Memphis" Hardaker, a member of the lads' skiffle group, Rob Ferris and the Wildcats. He was also mentioned in the original 1960s series as colleague Morrie Hardaker.
- Deirdre Birchwood, an ex-girlfriend of Bob with somewhat loose morals. The frequent references to her became a running gag (with the line "Don't mention Deirdre Birchwood!" becoming a catchphrase).
- Wendy Thwaite, another ex-girlfriend of Bob, with whom he had his first sexual experience
- Bryony Hood, another ex-girlfriend of Bob, who became a topless go-go dancer in Sunderland

== Episode guide ==
=== Series 1 ===
Episode Number	Episode Title	Summary	Air date
1.	"Strangers on a Train"	The lads are reunited by chance, after five years, aboard a homeward-bound train. Unfortunately for Bob, he inadvertently becomes stranded at Doncaster railway station, with fiancée Thelma waiting for him on the platform at Newcastle.	9 January 1973
2.	"Home Is the Hero"	Terry, newly demobbed from the army, finds it hard to adjust to all the changes that have occurred in Newcastle during his time in the army.	16 January 1973
3.	"Cold Feet"	Due to a misunderstanding, Terry causes havoc between Bob and Thelma, leading Bob to get cold feet about the wedding.	23 January 1973
4.	"Moving On"	A depressed Terry decides to go around the world with his old army pal, Hughie McClaren, who lives conveniently in Berwick-upon-Tweed.	30 January 1973
5.	"I'll Never Forget Whatshername"	Terry looks up some of his old flames. His lack of success makes him self-pitying and Bob smug, until it emerges that Terry had a drunken fling with Thelma on a coach trip. Bob is also revealed to have a hidden history with the ladies.	6 February 1973
6.	"Birthday Boy"	Terry becomes depressed when he thinks everyone has forgotten his birthday. A surprise party organised by Bob goes wrong when someone else is accidentally invited to it but when Terry finally arrives he manages inadvertently to offend most of the other guests.	13 February 1973
7.	"No Hiding Place"	The Lads try to avoid learning the result of an England football match before the TV highlights are shown that evening. Flint (Brian Glover) tries to spoil it for them, with a bet of £10, that they will not get through the day without learning the result. The lads are at the point of viewing the TV highlights, none the wiser about the score, when Flint tracks them down to Bob's new house. An angry Terry pays him off (with £10 borrowed from Bob). After all that, the match turns out to have been postponed due to a waterlogged pitch. This episode was remade by Ant & Dec for ITV in 2002, featuring a cameo appearance by Rodney Bewes as the old newspaper seller (see below).	20 February 1973
8.	"Guess Who's Coming to Dinner?"	Concerned with Terry's lack of social activities, Bob invites him to a dinner party at 'well to do' Alan and Brenda's. The occasion turns into a disaster when Terry embarrasses Brenda by talking about her past, but he gains an unexpected ally.	27 February 1973
9.	"Storm in a Tea Chest"	Thelma urges Bob to throw out all of his treasured childhood possessions (kept in two battered old tea chests) while hypocritically hanging on to all of her own. Features Robert Gillespie as the police sergeant.	6 March 1973
10.	"The Old Magic"	At an upmarket restaurant, the lads test out whether they still have "the old magic", but have picked the wrong girls.	13 March 1973
11.	"Count Down"	The countdown to Bob's wedding day begins. Terry, who despises the overly elaborate wedding preparations, finds an unexpected ally in Thelma's father George, a staunchly working-class builder. Stirred up by Terry's ridicule, the three men decide to rebel.	20 March 1973
12.	"Boys Night In"	On the eve of his wedding, Bob refuses to have a stag night, preferring a quiet night in with a cup of cocoa and a game of Ludo. Terry nonetheless tries to get him in the party mood and, as a result, they end up in a police cell.	27 March 1973
13.	"End of an Era"	Bob and Thelma are finally married. Things will never be the same again; old ways, old days, gone forever...or are they?	3 April 1973

=== Series 2 ===
Episode Number	Episode Title	Summary	Air date
14.	"Absent Friends"	Terry looks after Bob's new house while Bob and Thelma are on their honeymoon, and romances Thelma's younger sister, Susan (Anita Carey). This picks up some of the threads from the episode "The Old Magic".	1 January 1974
15.	"Heart to Heart"	Bob and Thelma return from honeymoon, while Terry and Susan realise that their feelings for each other were stronger than they previously thought.	8 January 1974
16.	"The Ant and the Grasshopper"	An overworked Bob grows tired of funding Terry's lazy lifestyle.	15 January 1974
17.	"One for the Road"	Bob is arrested for drink-driving. Terry, in the same cell for football hooliganism, attempts to help him out.	22 January 1974
18.	"The Great Race"	The lads attempt to relive their active youth with a bicycle race to Berwick-upon-Tweed, but cheat each other to a standstill.	5 February 1974
19.	"Some Day We'll Laugh About This"	Bob and Thelma go away for a weekend skiing trip in Scotland. In their absence, Terry performs some DIY at their house, while romancing their bored neighbour, Sandra.	19 February 1974
20.	"In Harm's Way"	Having been informed his unemployment payment is to be withdrawn, Terry reluctantly takes a job as a hospital porter. Bob, who injured his leg falling through a floor, is the victim of the disasters Terry causes.	26 February 1974
21.	"Affairs and Relations"	During a weekend fishing trip to Northumberland, Terry and Bob unexpectedly encounter Thelma's father, who is having an affair with his secretary, Beryl. Bob becomes despondent with having to constantly reassure Thelma by phone but, suspicious of what the lads are up to, she comes to the hotel anyway. A series of misunderstandings between Terry, Beryl and the hotel barmaid results in Thelma accusing an innocent Bob of having an affair.	5 March 1974
22.	"The Expert"	Thelma and Bob separate due to the events of the previous episode. Terry offers marriage guidance to Bob, despite the failure of his own marriage.	12 March 1974
23.	"Between Ourselves"	Terry moves in with a depressed Bob and plays housewife in Thelma's absence, while Bob tries unsuccessfully to conceal from their friends and neighbours that Thelma has left him.	19 March 1974
24.	"The Go-Between"	After living with Bob, Terry and Thelma discover that they both find Bob impossible to live with. Terry continues to try and help Bob and Thelma salvage their marriage. Another series of misunderstandings result in Bob and Thelma reconciling.	26 March 1974
25.	"Conduct Unbecoming"	Terry is convicted of assault following a fight with Douggie Scaife. Terry and Scaife settle their differences, but a misunderstanding on Bob's part results in him appearing in court for assaulting Scaife too.	2 April 1974
26.	"The Shape of Things to Come"	Terry's great-uncle Jacob dies, and he becomes despondent when he realises few people had a good word for him. At the wake, the lads speak with Jacob's lifelong friend Joe Hargreaves, and Bob sees in Jacob and Joe a terrible vision of how he and Terry will be in forty years' time.	9 April 1974
27.	"Special Christmas Edition"	Terry passes his driving test and gets a job as a minicab driver. On Christmas Eve he drives Thelma and Bob to a party, which leads to more trouble. The title card for this episode reads simply "The Likely Lads". A slightly different version of the theme tune, featuring Christmas bells, is also used.	24 December 1974

== Radio series ==
The thirteen episodes of Series 1 were adapted for radio, with the original television cast, and broadcast on Radio 4 between 30 July and 22 October 1975. This series is periodically re-broadcast in the "classic comedy" hour on digital radio channel BBC Radio 4 Extra.

== Context ==
Before the 1970s series was made, the cast had already been reunited twice, in 1967 and 1968, to record sixteen of the original television scripts for two series (of eight episodes each) on BBC Radio, the scripts for which were adapted for radio by James Bolam.

To emphasise continuity, the opening section of the title credits at the start of each episode includes a short montage of black-and-white stills photos of Bob and Terry in scenes from the 1960s series, presented as if in a photograph album. The leather-bound photo album, which Bob gives Terry before the wedding, in the episode "End of an Era", is also the one seen in the opening credits.

To avoid animosity over billing, Rodney Bewes and James Bolam were alternated in the opening credits, so that one week Bewes was billed first and the following week Bolam was. In the closing credits the billing was reversed, with whoever had been billed second in the opening credits being billed first.

Bewes maintained his connections with The Likely Lads, appearing in a cameo role as the old newspaper seller in a 2002 ITV remake of the series' most popular episode, "No Hiding Place", starring Tyneside entertainers Ant and Dec, which aired under the title A Tribute to the Likely Lads.

In 1995 and 1996, the series was repeated in its entirety on BBC2. It went on to become a short-term staple of cable channels and was again shown on satellite and cable TV in 2008 and 2009. In April 2013, the first series began a repeat run on BBC Four, its first showing on terrestrial television since 1996. Both series and the feature film have also been released on DVD.

The titles for the 1974 Christmas Special call the show simply The Likely Lads.

Exterior shots were filmed on Tyneside and around the north-east, while interiors were shot at the BBC Television Centre in London.

The BBC decided not to commission a third series of the show, partly because Dick Clement and Ian La Frenais had written a pilot script for another 1973 series, entitled Seven of One, in which Ronnie Barker appeared in seven different situations from different writers, each of which was a try-out for a possible series. The BBC decided they liked one by Clement and La Frenais, who found themselves suddenly offered a new series, starring Barker, which became the television comedy Porridge.

Writing and production for the new show, which debuted in the autumn of 1974 and ran for three series, made it difficult to schedule a further series of The Likely Lads. Instead, Clement and La Frenais began to develop a one-off script, which became The Likely Lads feature film, which was eventually made in 1976.

== Home media ==
The complete first and second series of the 1970s show (including the Christmas special) were made available in the UK on Region 2 DVD.

== Feature film ==
In 1976 a feature-length film was released, written by Clement and La Frenais, which was directed by Michael Tuchner. By this time, Terry has moved to a high-rise flat and also has a Finnish girlfriend called Christina ("Chris"), played by Mary Tamm. Both Mary Tamm and James Bolam's wife Susan Jameson appeared in Doctor Who with Tom Baker.

The film opens with the lads lamenting the demolition of one of their favourite pubs, The Fat Ox, before they go on a caravanning holiday with Thelma and Chris. The complications resulting from the trip lead to Terry and Chris splitting up, as a result of which Terry decides to emigrate, signing on as a crewman on a cargo ship.

Bob and Terry sneak one last late-night drink together aboard Terry's ship, anchored in the docks; but Terry has second thoughts, and disembarks the next morning. Bob, however, awakes, hung over, aboard the ship, as it sails for Bahrain. This was a reversal of the ending of the original 1960s show (in which Terry was missing Bob who had joined the Army, so he joined up too, only to discover that Bob had been discharged with flat feet).

== A Tribute to the Likely Lads ==
In 2002, the episode "No Hiding Place" was remade by Ginger Productions for ITV, featuring Declan Donnelly as Bob and Ant McPartlin as Terry, and Rodney Bewes in a cameo role. Reception was lukewarm: most critics agreed that, on paper, the pair were perfectly cast, but that they seemed too young to play Bob and Terry at that point in their lives.

== Stage version ==
In 2008, the Gala Theatre in Durham staged the world premiere of The Likely Lads, adapted for the stage by Dick Clement and Ian La Frenais and directed by Simon Stallworthy. The title roles of Bob and Terry were played by David Nellist and Scott Frazer respectively.

In May 2011, the Tynemouth Priory Theatre, in Tynemouth, was granted the rights to become the first non-professional company to stage the production. It became one of the theatre's most attended productions, selling out well in advance for all performances. Terry was played by Brendan Egan and Bob by Stu Bowman.

== In popular culture ==
- The title song "Whatever Happened to You?" was recorded and released as a single, sung by Highly Likely. It was also released as a single by the British punk band Snuff, titled "Christmas Single".
- Ricky Gervais and Stephen Merchant have said the show was an influence on The Office.
- English indie rock band the Libertines released a song titled "What Became Of The Likely Lads"; it is the closing track on their self-titled second album.

== See also ==
- List of films based on British sitcoms
