= The Broxbourne School =

Location
- High Road; Broxbourne, Hertfordshire, EN10 7DD; England; 51.7412°N 0.0255°W

Information
- Type: Academy
- Motto: Achievement & Opportunity for All
- Established: 1959
- Founder: Ian Laydon
- Department for Education URN: 136396 Tables
- Ofsted: Reports
- Headteacher: Peter Clift
- Gender: Coeducational
- Age: 11 to 18
- Houses: Attenborough, Hepworth, Nightingale, Dickens
- Website: http://www.broxbourne.herts.sch.uk/

The Broxbourne School is a coeducational secondary school and sixth form with academy status located in Broxbourne, Hertfordshire, England.

The school began life in 1959 with just under 50 pupils as a grammar school (Broxbourne Grammar School) under the headmastership of Ian Laydon. In 1969 the school became a comprehensive school. The school was converted to academy status in February 2012. It had been a community school under the direct control of Hertfordshire County Council. The school continues to coordinate with the council for admissions.

The Broxbourne School offers General Certificate of Secondary Education (GCSEs) and Business and Technology Education Council (BTECs) as courses of study for pupils, with A Levels offered in the sixth form. The school also offers the Duke of Edinburgh's Award as an activity for pupils.

== Development ==
The school underwent major redevelopment between 2017 & 2019. This included a new school and leisure hub and the demolition of the old school. Approximately 150 new homes were built on the old site.

Traditionally, students at the school belonged to Austen, Milton, Brontë or Chaucer House before they were renamed.

== Notable Old Broxbournians ==
- Roald Bradstock, Olympic athlete and Olympic Artist, A.K.A "The Olympic Picasso"
- Deborah Chancellor, writer
- Sezen Djouma, child actress
- Pat Jennings Jr., football player
- Dave Lamb, actor & comedian
- Acer Nethercott, coxswain & Olympic silver medallist
- Dan Quine, computer scientist and historian
- Matthew Spring, football player
- David Toop, musician and author
- Rachel Treweek, first female diocesan bishop in the Church of England
