= Matt Bardock =

English actor

Matthew Arthur Bardock (born 1969) is an English actor. He is best known for playing Jeff Collier in Casualty, DS Clive Barnard in A Touch of Frost, DS Davey Higgins in The Coroner, Albie in The Lakes, Mark Craig in New Blood and DS Simon Morgan in Manhunt: The Nightstalker.

== Early life ==
Bardock was born in Croydon, South London, England.

== Career ==
Bardock made his television debut in 1992, when he appeared in Prime Suspect as sadistic pornographer Jason Reynolds. The following year, he appeared in Casualty as a leading gang member who set fire to the ED. In 1995, Bardock appeared in the stage production of Mojo by Jez Butterworth at the Royal Court Theatre.

Bardock gained recognition for his role as DC Clive Barnard in the British television series A Touch of Frost. His character is the nephew of the Chief Constable, which prompts many of his colleagues to believe he was fast-tracked into CID by his uncle. Frost sees beyond that, takes Barnard under his wing, and they develop a good working rapport. Barnard is later promoted to Detective Sergeant, but the character is killed in the 1997 episode, "No Other Love."

July and August 2000 saw Bardock play the role of Danny Weir in the short-lived TV comedy Pay and Display. He appeared in The Bill in 2004 as murder suspect Scott Burnett, who begins a relationship with PC Honey Harman and later marries her, though the marriage is short-lived after it is discovered that he murdered his first wife. His character later dies in prison from having hanged himself. In 2005, Bardock had a small guest role on ITV's Midsomer Murders and played DI Tom Wilson in New Tricks. The following year, Bardock appeared as registrar Peter Compton in the Channel 4 series No Angels.

Bardock re-joined the BBC television series Casualty in February 2007 for three months, this time as paramedic Jeff Collier; he returned to the role in September of that year. On 30 June 2014, it was announced that Bardock would be leaving Casualty, and his character was killed off later that year.

From July into September 2014, Bardock appeared in the comedy play My Night With Reg at the Donmar Warehouse theatre in the West End. Beginning in 2015, he co-starred for two series with Claire Goose in BBC's The Coroner, as DS Davey Higgins. In 2016, he played Mark Craig in three episodes of the BBC Drama New Blood. He appeared as Detective Inspector Johnson in 2018's heist film King of Thieves, starring Michael Caine, Jim Broadbent, Francesca Annis, and Tom Courtenay. In 2021, Bardock played DSU Simon Morgan in Series 2 of ITV's true crime series Manhunt, alongside Martin Clunes.

== Notable roles ==
=== Film ===
- All or Nothing (2002) ... Man at Bar (director: Mike Leigh)
- Bollywood Queen (2001) ... Facer (director: Jeremy Wooding)

Year	Film	Role	Director	Notes
1999	Topsy-Turvy	Mr Benjamin Trip	Mike Leigh	
1999	This Year's Love	David; Billy's mate	David Kane	
2000	Honest	Cedric	Paul Weiland	
2001	Jimmy Fizz	Drew	Tony Maylam	
2006	Sixty Six	Mr Grieg	Paul Weiland	
2007	Cassandra's Dream	Finn; Jaguar Owner	Woody Allen	

=== Television ===
- Manhunt Series 2 - 2021
- New Blood Mark Craig; 2016–present
- The Coroner Detective Sergeant Davey Higgins; 2015–2016
- Doctor Who ... Al; 2014 (director: Douglas Mackinnon)
- New Street Law ... Dennis Longwell; 2006 (director: David Skynner)
- The Street ... Alex; 2006 (director: David Blair)
- No Angels ... Peter; 2005
- The Bill ... Scott Burnett; 2005
- Judge John Deed ... Alan Ferns; 2004 (director: Tristram Powell)
- Midsomer Murders ... Harry Rose; 2005 (director: Peter Smith)
- New Tricks ... DI Tom Wilson; 2004 (director: Martyn Friend)
- Family ... Inspector Mickey Fowler; 2003 (director: David Drury)
- Suspicion ... DS Wilmot; 2003 (director: Jamie Payne)
- Murder in Mind ... Charles Merrick; 2002 (director: Coky Giedroyc)
- The Art of War ...Keith Reynolds; 2002
- 'Orrible ... Reuben; 2001 (director: Dominic Brigstocke)
- Murphy's Law ... Johnny; 2001 (director: John Strickland)
- Dirty Tricks ... Clive; 2000 (director: Paul Seed)
- Pay and Display ... Daniel Weir; 2000 (director: Andy D'Emmoney)
- Last Christmas ... Bobby Moore; 1999 (director: Adrian Shergold)
- Kavanagh QC ... Rev. Ian Winfarthing in "Innocency of Life"; 14 April 1998(director: Ferdy Fairfax)
- The Lakes ... Albie; 1997-1999 (director: David Blair)
- The History of Tom Jones: a Foundling ... Jack; 1997 (director: Metin Huseyin)
- Deep Secrets ... Martin; 1996 (director: Diarmiud Lawrence)
- Bodyguards ... DI Trevor Curran; 1995 (director: Bob Bierman)
- The Adventures of Young Indiana Jones ... Carl in "Attack of the Hawkmen"; 8 October 1995 (director: Ben Burtt)
- Casualty ... Terry; 1993 (director: Michael Owen Morris)
- A Touch of Frost ... DC Barnard; 1992
- Prime Suspect ... Jason; 1992 (director: John Strickland)
- Casualty ... Jeff Collier (2007–2014)
- Doctors ... Ryan Stevens (2020)

=== Theatre ===
- My Night With Reg; Donmar Warehouse, London; 17 January – 11 April 2015 (director: Robert Hastie)
- The Dark ... Barnaby; Donmar Warehouse, London; 23 March – 24 April 2004 (director: Anna Mackmin)
- Frame 312 ... Tom and Roy; Donmar Warehouse, London; 2002 (director: Josie Rourke)
- Kick For Touch ... Joe; Crucible Theatre, London; 2002 (director: Josie Rourke)
