= The Likely Lads =

British TV sitcom (1964–1966)

- Opening title used for the third series, showing Bewes as Bob (left) and Bolam as Terry
- Starring: James Bolam; Rodney Bewes; Sheila Fearn
- Country of origin: United Kingdom
- Original language: English
- No. of series: 3
- No. of episodes: 21 (10 missing)

Production
- Producer: Dick Clement
- Running time: 30 minutes
- Production company: BBC Television

Original release
- Network: BBC2
- Release: 16 December 1964 – 23 July 1966

Related
- Whatever Happened to the Likely Lads?

The Likely Lads is a British sitcom created and written by Dick Clement and Ian La Frenais and produced by Dick Clement. Twenty-one episodes were broadcast by the BBC, in three series, between 16 December 1964 and 23 July 1966, but only ten of these episodes have survived.

This show was followed by a sequel series, in colour, entitled Whatever Happened to the Likely Lads?, broadcast between 9 January 1973 and 24 December 1974. This was followed in 1976 by a spin-off feature film The Likely Lads.

Some episodes of both the original black and white series and the colour sequel were adapted for BBC radio with the original television cast.

== Premise ==
The original show followed the friendship of two young working class men, Terry Collier (James Bolam) and Bob Ferris (Rodney Bewes), in the mid-1960s. Bob and Terry are assumed to be in their early 20s (when their ages are revealed in the later film, this puts both characters at around 20 when the series started).

After growing up at school and in the Scouts together, Bob and Terry are working in the same factory, Ellison's Electrical, alongside the older, wiser duo of Cloughie and Jack. The show's humour derived largely from the tensions between Terry's cynical, everyman, working class personality and Bob's ambition to better himself and move to the middle class.

Bob and Terry are two average working class lads growing up (despite Bob's very West Yorkshire accent) in the industrial North East, whose hobbies are beer, football and girls. They are street-wise, yet they stumble into one scrape after another as they struggle to enjoy the Swinging Sixties on their meagre incomes.

At the end of the third and final series in 1966, a depressed and bored Bob attempts to join the Army but is rejected because of his flat feet. Terry, who decides at the last minute to enlist to keep Bob company, is accepted and shipped away for three years.

It was gradually revealed that Terry and Bob's full names are Terence Daniel Collier and Robert Andrew Scarborough Ferris (Scarborough not revealed until the 1970s colour series). According to the later feature film, made in 1976, both Lads were conceived during the same wartime air raid and were thus born in the same year, 1944.

Although in the colour sequel much is made of Thelma, who is said to have been Bob's childhood sweetheart, she had appeared only once in the original show, in which Bob has no steady girlfriend and is forever seeking one, though Thelma is mentioned in some episodes in series three, including "Rocker" and "Goodbye to All That".

== Cast ==
- James Bolam as Terry Collier
- Rodney Bewes as Bob Ferris
- Brigit Forsyth as Thelma Chambers
- Sheila Fearn as Audrey Collier, Terry's older sister
- Bartlett Mullins as Cloughie, a workmate
- Don McKillop as Jack, another workmate
- Olive Milbourne as Mrs Edith Collier, Terry and Audrey's mother
- Alex McDonald as Mr Cyril Collier, Terry and Audrey's dad
- Irene Richmond as Mrs Alice Ferris, Bob's mother
- Richard Moore as Blakey

Guest stars included George Layton, Garfield Morgan, Wendy Richard, Wanda Ventham, Susan Jameson (the real-life wife of James Bolam), Michael Sheard, Nerys Hughes, Geoffrey Hughes, Helen Fraser and Tony Caunter.

== Episodes ==
Only eleven episodes survive (as film telerecordings) in the BBC's archives, as a result of its wiping policy of the time. However, the BBC Archive Treasure Hunt, a public campaign, continues to search for missing episodes. Of the ten remaining lost episodes, only 'The Razor's Edge' was not recorded as part of the radio adaptation series.

=== Series 1 (1964–65) ===
Title	Airdate	Description	Notes
Entente Cordiale	16 December 1964	The lads return home from their first foreign holiday, pursued by a girl they met in Spain.	
Double Date	23 December 1964	A lovelorn Bob is cheered up by a double date.	Guest stars: Susan Jameson; Coral Atkins.
Christmas Night with the Stars sketch	25 December 1964	At Christmas Terry and Bob make a bet on which characters appeared in a Rupert Bear annual.	
Older Women Are More Experienced	30 December 1964	Terry finds an older girlfriend and Bob finds a younger one.	
Other Side of the Fence	6 January 1965	Bob is offered a better job, in management.	Guest stars: Michael Sheard; Anneke Wills
Chance of a Lifetime	13 January 1965	The lads are offered the chance to emigrate to Australia.	Missing – re-made as radio adaptation An audio recording of the episode exists. Guest star: Garfield Morgan
The Suitor	20 January 1965	Terry enlists Bob's help to try to get rid of his sister's Italian boyfriend.	Guest star: George Layton

=== Series 2 (1965) ===
Title	Airdate	Description	Notes
Baby, It's Cold Outside	16 June 1965	The lads have a double date arranged but nowhere they can take the girls afterwards.	Missing – re-made as radio adaptation
A Star Is Born	23 June 1965	The lads compete in a pub talent night	Previously missing, recovered in 2018
Talk of the Town	30 June 1965	Bob's engagement to Thelma becomes the talk of the town, but is news to Bob.	Missing – re-made as radio adaptation. An audio recording of the episode exists. Guest stars: Helen Fraser; Irene Richmond
The Last of the Big Spenders	7 July 1965	The lads take two London girls out on the town.	Previously missing, recovered in 2001; Wendy Richard; Wanda Ventham; Michael Sheard
Far Away Places	14 July 1965	The lads plan another foreign holiday but have trouble raising the money for it.	Previously missing, recovered in 2018
Where Have All the Flowers Gone?	21 July 1965	The lads attend a friend's wedding and realise that they are now the only unmarried men they know.	Missing – re-made as radio adaptation Guest star: George Layton

=== Series 3 (1966) ===
Title	Airdate	Description	Notes
Outward Bound	4 June 1966	The lads go camping, planning to end up at a campsite notorious for hippy love-ins.	Missing – re-made as radio adaptation Guest star: Nerys Hughes
Friends and Neighbours	11 June 1966	Bob is caught in the middle when Terry's granddad starts a feud with Bob's next-door neighbours, whose daughter is Bob's new girlfriend.	Missing – re-made as radio adaptation An audio recording of the episode exists.
Rocker	18 June 1966	Bob buys a moped and Terry ends up in hospital.	
Brief Encounter	25 June 1966	Unbeknownst to each other Bob and Terry are both dating the same girl.	Missing – re-made as radio adaptation (re-titled "Their Hearts Were Touched By Ursula") An audio recording of the episode exists.
The Razor's Edge	2 July 1966	Bob grows a beard, which causes him trouble at work. When Terry tries to defend him things go from bad to worse.	Missing – An audio recording of the episode exists. Guest stars: Geoffrey Hughes; Irene Richmond
Anchors Aweigh	9 July 1966	The lads take a boating holiday together on the Norfolk Broads, despite Terry's deep mistrust of boats.	Missing – re-made as radio adaptation An audio recording of the episode exists.
Love and Marriage	16 July 1966	The lads are invited on a stag night.	Missing – re-made as radio adaptation Guest stars: Helen Fraser; Geoffrey Hughes
Goodbye to All That	23 July 1966	Bob joins the army and Terry, finding life lonely on his own, decides to join up too.	Guest stars: Irene Richmond; Tony Caunter

== Christmas Night with the Stars ==
Additionally, an eight-minute episode of The Likely Lads was broadcast on 25 December 1964, as part of a 90-minute Christmas Day special on BBC 1 called Christmas Night with the Stars 7:15 p.m. to 8:45 p.m., in which Bob and Terry have an argument over Bob's encyclopaedic knowledge of "Rupert Bear" Annuals ("It was Edward Trunk!"). This recording still exists in the BBC Broadcast Archive. An edited version, which included 'The Likely Lads' sketch, was screened on BBC2 over Christmas 1991.

== Radio adaptations ==
Sixteen of the television scripts were adapted for radio by James Bolam, and broadcast in two series during 1967 and 1968.

Produced by John Browell, the radio adaptations were recorded at the Paris Studios in Lower Regent Street, London using the original television cast (although some minor parts had to be recast for some episodes, where the original actor was unavailable). As of January 2025, BBC Radio 4 Extra started broadcasting the first series only for the first time on that station.

=== Series 1 ===
Title	Airdate	Cast	Notes
1. Where Have All the Flowers Gone?	6 August 1967	Bob – Rodney Bewes; Terry – James Bolam; Audrey – Sheila Fearn; Mrs Collier – Olive Milbourne; Vicar, Uncle Walter – John Cazabon; Auntie Peggy – Betty Hardy; Cyril – Le Roy Lingwood; Elaine – Carol Marsh; Beryl – Rosalind Shanks	Series 1 was broadcast on the BBC Light Programme
2. The Suitor	13 August 1967	Bob – Rodney Bewes; Terry – James Bolam; Audrey – Sheila Fearn; Mrs Collier – Olive Milbourne; Mario – George Layton	
3. Rocker	20 August 1967	Bob – Rodney Bewes; Terry – James Bolam; Motor Salesman – Reginald Jessup; Nurse – Cheryl Molineaux; Carol – Rosalind Shanks	
4. Older Women Are More Experienced	27 August 1967	Bob – Rodney Bewes; Terry – James Bolam; Mrs Winsor – Rhoda Lewis; Jack – Donald McKillop; Cloughy – Bartlett Mullins; Sheila, Elsie – Madeleine Mills	
5. Baby, It's Cold Outside	3 September 1967	Bob – Rodney Bewes; Terry – James Bolam; Audrey – Sheila Fearn; Jack – Donald McKillop; Margaret – Dorothy White; Jane, Baby – Shirley Jaffe; Rose – Kate Story; June – Janet Kelly	
6. Outward Bound	10 September 1967	Bob – Rodney Bewes; Terry – James Bolam; The Scoutmaster – Peter Hawkins; The Postmistress – Kathleen Helme; Jack – Donald McKillop; Valerie – Janet Kelly; Susan – Kate Story; Cafe Proprietor, Lorry Driver – David Brierly	
7. The Talk of the Town	17 September 1967	Bob – Rodney Bewes; Terry – James Bolam; Jack – Donald McKillop; Cloughy – John Henderson; Audrey – Sheila Fearn; Mrs Ferris – Kathleen Helme; Elsie – Madeleine Mills; Thelma – Susan Jameson; Big Duggie – Michael Kilgarriff; Blakey – Douglas Hankin	The part of Cloughy was recast this week, as Bartlett Mullins was not available. The part of Thelma was also recast, with Susan Jameson playing the role on this occasion. She had previously appeared in the television series as a different character, in the episode "Double Date".
8. Anchors Aweigh	24 September 1967	Bob – Rodney Bewes; Terry – James Bolam; Mum – Julie May; Sally – Sara Kestelman; Denise – Madeleine Mills; Sam – Wilfred Carter	

=== Series 2 ===
Title	Airdate	Cast	Notes
1. Friends and Neighbours	19 May 1968	Bob – Rodney Bewes; Terry – James Bolam; Granddad – Bert Palmer; Mrs Perrin – Noel Dyson; Mr Perrin – Glenn Melvyn; Lorna Perrin – Angela Lovell	Series 2 was broadcast on BBC Radio 2
2. The Other Side of the Fence	26 May 1968	Bob – Rodney Bewes; Terry – James Bolam; Jack – Donald McKillop; Cloughy – Bartlett Mullins; Blakey, Roger – Richard Moore; Nesbit – Michael Sheard; Holgate – Eric Dodson; Judith – Anneke Wills; Sally Anne – Didi Sullivan	
3. Entente Cordiale	2 June 1968	Bob – Rodney Bewes; Terry – James Bolam; Audrey – Sheila Fearn; Mrs Collier – Olive Milbourne; Jack – Donald McKillop; Cloughy – Erik Chitty; Louise, Waitress – Anna Gilchrist; Colette – Bettina Le Beau	The part of Cloughy was recast this week, as Bartlett Mullins was not available
4. Double Date	9 June 1968	Bob – Rodney Bewes; Terry – James Bolam; Audrey – Sheila Fearn; Deirdre – Dilys Watling; Pat – Susan Jameson	
5. Love and Marriage	16 June 1968	Bob – Rodney Bewes; Terry – James Bolam; Jack – Donald McKillop; Cloughy – Bartlett Mullins; Duggie – Derek Newark; Helen – Helen Fraser; Archie – Roger Avon; Podge – Geoffrey Hughes; Mrs Foster – Doris Rogers	
6. Their Hearts Were Touched by Ursula	23 June 1968	Bob – Rodney Bewes; Terry – James Bolam; Ursula – Isobel Black; Jack – Donald McKillop; Cloughy – Bartlett Mullins; All other female parts – Jennifer Croxton; All other male parts – Peter Hawkins	An adaptation of the television episode Brief Encounter
7. Chance of a Lifetime	30 June 1968	Bob – Rodney Bewes; Terry – James Bolam; Audrey – Sheila Fearn; Sgt Jeffcock – Garfield Morgan; Ralph – Barry Linehan; Jack – Donald McKillop; Cloughy – Bartlett Mullins; Cecile – Veronica Lang; Blakey – George Layton	
8. Goodbye to all That	7 July 1968	Bob – Rodney Bewes; Terry – James Bolam; Audrey – Sheila Fearn; Jack – Donald McKillop; Cloughy – Bartlett Mullins; Mrs Collier – Olive Milbourne; Mr Collier – Alex McDonald; George – Barry Stanton; Army Sergeant – Tony Caunter; Mrs Ferris – Irene Richmond; Youth – Andrew Robertson; Recruit – Hugh Walters	

== DVD, Blu-ray and book releases ==
Only seven of the eight (then) extant episodes were included on the original UK DVD release issued in February 2006, in spite of the cover stating that it contained all the surviving episodes. The absent eighth episode, The Other Side of the Fence, was subsequently included on the Likely Lads and Whatever Happened to the Likely Lads? combined box set in October 2006, presented as an 'extra' rather than in chronological order.

A Star Is Born and Far Away Places, two previously missing episodes from the second series recovered in 2018, were included as extras on the 2019 Network DVD and Blu-ray release of the 1976 feature film.

In 2024, BBC Studios released The Likely Lads Complete Collection DVD for the show's 60th anniversary, presenting all ten surviving episodes of the original 60s series alongside either off-air or radio versions of the remaining ten lost episodes for the very first time.

In 1967 a book -The Likely Lads - was published, comprising novelisations of nine episodes from all three series.

== See also ==
- List of films based on British sitcoms
- The Liver Birds, a comparable comedy about two women living in Liverpool.

== Sources ==
- A Likely Story: The Autobiography of Rodney Bewes, published by Century, 1 September 2005
- BBC Comedy Guide, The Likely Lads
- BBC Comedy Guide, Whatever Happened to The Likely Lads
- The Likely Lads on Tyne
- The Likely Lads IMDB entry
- Whatever Happened to The Likely Lads IMDB entry
