= James Bolam =

English actor (born 1935)

James Bolam MBE
- Bolam as Terry Collier in Whatever Happened to the Likely Lads?
- Born: James Christopher Bolam; 16 June 1935 (age 91); Sunderland, County Durham, England
- Education: Royal Central School of Speech and Drama
- Occupation: Actor
- Years active: 1961–present
- Spouse: Susan Jameson (m. 1971)
- Children: 1

James Christopher Bolam (born 16 June 1935) is an English actor. He is best known for his roles as Terry Collier in The Likely Lads and its sequel Whatever Happened to the Likely Lads?, Jack Ford in When the Boat Comes In, Roy Figgis in Only When I Laugh, Trevor Chaplin in The Beiderbecke Trilogy, Arthur Gilder in Born and Bred, Jack Halford in New Tricks and the character of Grandpa in the CBeebies programme Grandpa in My Pocket. He played the title role in the ITV drama Shipman and portrayed Harold Wilson in the BBC documentary The Plot Against Harold Wilson.

For When the Boat Comes In, Bolam was twice nominated for the British Academy Television Award for Best Actor in 1977 and 1978 and in 1995 he was nominated for the Laurence Olivier Award for Best Actor for Glengarry Glen Ross at The Donmar Warehouse.

== Early life ==
Bolam was born on 16 June 1935 in Sunderland, County Durham. His father, Robert Alfred Bolam, was from Northumberland, and his mother, Marion Alice Drury, from County Durham. After attending Bede Grammar School, Sunderland, Bolam attended Bemrose School in Derby. Bolam trained as an articled clerk to a chartered accountant, before becoming an actor, and formally trained at the Central School of Speech and Drama, London, where he won the gold medal and the Margaret Rawlings Cup. Lacking funding for his fees, he worked in Lyons Corner House tearoom and West End restaurants, washing dishes at night and studying during the day.

== Career ==
=== 1960s & 1970s ===
Bolam's first professional engagement was at the Royal Court Theatre as an understudy to Ronnie Barker in Chekhov's "Platonov". He first appeared on screens in the early 1960s, initially in television shows such as Z-Cars and the Northern social realist films A Kind of Loving and The Loneliness of the Long Distance Runner (both 1962), in the latter film as the best friend of the title character (played by Tom Courtenay).

It was The Likely Lads, with Bolam as Terry Collier and Rodney Bewes as Bob Ferris, which made Bolam a star during its 1964 to 1966 run and he adapted the scripts for a BBC Radio version soon afterwards. He appeared with John Thaw in the Granada serial, Inheritance in 1967.

Before the sequel, Whatever Happened to the Likely Lads?, began its run, Bolam appeared in films such as Half a Sixpence (1967), Otley (1969), and O Lucky Man! (1973). The revived series, chronicling the further adventures of Bob and Terry, lasted for two series broadcast in 1973 and 1974 and a 45-minute 1974 Christmas Eve special.

In 1975, Bolam appeared alongside the original cast in a further BBC Radio series adapted from the 1973 TV series and in 1976 there was a reunion in a feature film spin-off from the series, simply entitled The Likely Lads. Bolam's co-star Rodney Bewes stated in 2005 that the two actors had not spoken since the film had been made, a period of over thirty years. The rift, according to Bewes, developed through his indiscreetly telling a journalist that when Bolam's wife revealed she was pregnant, Bolam was so startled that the car he was driving mounted a pavement and almost crashed into a lamp post. Bolam denied there was a rift between the two men when Bewes died in November 2017, claiming that they "didn't talk for 40 years because of their busy schedules rather than resentment".

In 1976, Bolam returned to straight drama; he played Jack Ford in the BBC Television series When the Boat Comes In, which ran until 1981.

=== 1980s onwards ===
Since When the Boat Comes In, Bolam has mostly appeared in comedies and comedy dramas, including Only When I Laugh (as Roy Figgis) from 29 October 1979 to 16 December 1982, The Beiderbecke Affair (as Trevor Chaplin) in 1985, The Beiderbecke Tapes in 1987, Andy Capp (in the title role), The Beiderbecke Connection in 1988, Second Thoughts (as Bill MacGregor) from 3 May 1991 to 14 October 1994, Midsomer Murders, Pay and Display, Dalziel and Pascoe, Close and True, Born and Bred (as Dr Arthur Gilder), and New Tricks (as Jack Halford). Another memorable role was alongside Timothy West and Sheila Hancock in the 2002 series of the BBC comedy-drama Bedtime, in which Bolam played the seemingly decent but actually crooked Ronnie Stribling.

On radio, in 1978, Bolam played Willie Garvin in a BBC World Service radio adaptation of the Modesty Blaise book Last Day in Limbo. He provided the voice for The Tod in the animated film version of The Plague Dogs (1982). In the mid-1980s, he co-starred in the original radio version of the romantic sitcom Second Thoughts, which ran for several series and was subsequently adapted for television with Bolam reprising his role. In the year 2000 he played Sir Archibald Flint in the Doctor Who audio play The Spectre of Lanyon Moor. He was also the narrator for the three-part football documentary Three Lions, which aired before Euro 2000 on BBC One. The three episodes were about England's National Team's history from the 1966 World Cup until before the Euro 2000 finals.

In 2002, Bolam played the serial killer Harold Shipman in Shipman, the ITV adaptation of Brian Whittle and Jean Ritchie's book on the case, Prescription for Murder and Father Leonard Tibbings in Dalziel and Pascoe (Ser. 7, Ep. 1 'Sins of the Fathers'). He portrayed Harold Wilson, the former Prime Minister, in the 2006 BBC documentary The Plot Against Harold Wilson. He appeared in Frank Loesser's musical How to Succeed in Business Without Really Trying at the Chichester Festival Theatre during the 2005 summer season. He played the role of Grandpa in the Cbeebies show Grandpa in My Pocket. In 2009 he played Ken Lewis, CEO of the Bank of America, in the television dramatisation The Last Days of Lehman Brothers. His appearances on the London stage include Jeffrey Bernard is Unwell by Keith Waterhouse.

== Personal life ==
Bolam lives in Wisborough Green, West Sussex and Chiswick, London, with his wife, actress Susan Jameson. They have one daughter.

Bolam is known for being guarded about his private life. He once remarked: "I'm having a man fix the track rods on my car. I don't want to know anything about him. Why should he want to know anything about me?"

Bolam plays golf and is a member of the Stage Golfing Society. In 2013 he campaigned against oil drilling near Wisborough Green, and later appeared in a 2017 video protesting against a proposed extension to oil drilling in West Sussex.

Bolam was appointed Member of the Order of the British Empire (MBE) in the 2009 Birthday Honours "For services to Drama".

== Filmography ==
Year	Title	Role	Notes
1961	The Kitchen	Michael	
1962	H.M.S. Defiant	Midshipman Assisting in Operation	Uncredited
1962	A Kind of Loving	Jeff	
1962	The Loneliness of the Long Distance Runner	Mike	
1964	Murder Most Foul	Bill Hanson	
1966	The Sandwich Man	Navvy with Cap	Uncredited cameo
1967	Half a Sixpence	Mr. Jones	
1968	Otley	Albert	
1971	Crucible of Terror	John Davies	
1972	Straight on till Morning	Joey	
1973	O Lucky Man!	Attenborough / Examination Doctor	
1975	In Celebration	Colin Shaw	
1976	The Likely Lads	Terry Collier	
1982	The Plague Dogs	The Tod	Voice
1983	Clash of Loyalties	A. T. Wilson	
1994	Seaview Nights	Merlin	
1995	Clockwork Mice	Wackey	
1996	Stella Does Tricks	Mr. Peters	
1997	The Island on Bird Street	Dr. Studjinsky	
1999	The End of the Affair	Mr. Savage	
2000	It Was an Accident	Vernon Fitch	
2003	To Kill a King	Denzil Holles	
2005	More of Loesser	J. B. Biggley	
2012	Unconditional	Hutch	
2025	A Memory Owed	Stanley	Short film

== Television credits ==
Year	Title	Role	Notes
1960	Julius Caesar	Various	3 episodes
1962	ITV Play of the Week	Johnny	Episode: "The Week-Enders"
1962	Probation Officer	Alan Pendle	Episode: #4.19
1962	Drama 61-67	Nick	Episode: "The Slaughter Men"
1962	ITV Television Playhouse	Bert	Episode: "No Cause for Alarm"
1963	The Odd Man	Juke Justice	Episode: "This Stuff's Thicker Than Water"
1963	Love Story	Charlie Mitchell	Episode: "Charlie Is My Darling"
1963	ITV Play of the Week	Herbert Hudd	Episode: "Out There"
1963	Taxi!	Lionel Curtiss	Episode: "Can't You Drive a Little Faster?"
1963	ITV Play of the Week	Hec Hammond	Episode: "London Wall"
1963	Z-Cars	Tom Potter	Episode: "Supper in the Morning"
1963	ITV Television Playhouse	Sam Weller	Episode: "Mr. Pickwick"
1964	It's Dark Outside	Wilfred	Episode: "A Case for Identification"
1964	The Four Seasons of Rosie Carr	Frank Lambert	3 episodes
1964	ITV Play of the Week	Roland Maule	Episode: "Present Laughter"
1964	Cluff	Jacob Bateson	Episode: "The Daughter-In-Law"
1964	No Hiding Place	George Holmes	Episode: "Rogue's Gallery"
1964–1966	The Likely Lads	Terry Collier	All 20 episodes
1965	Thursday Theatre	Magpie	Episode: "Naked Island"
1967	Thirty-Minute Theatre	Muggles	Episode: "The Sufferings of Peter Obiznov"
1967	Inheritance	Joe Bamforth	5 episodes
1968	Inside George Webley	Policeman	Episode: "Hold Your Breath and Count to Fifty"
1968	Omnibus	Pinkie	Episode: "Graham Greene: The Hunted Man"
1969	Boy Meets Girl	McHenry	Episode: "One, Two, Sky's Blue"
1969	ITV Sunday Night Theatre	Jack Todd	Episode: "Wolly Wenpol, the Complete Works"
1970	W. Somerset Maugham	Leslie Gaze	Episode: "Footprints in the Jungle"
1971	Take Three Girls	Toby Baxter	2 episodes
1971	Public Eye	Alan Grove	Episode: "I Always Wanted a Swimming Pool"
1971	The Rivals of Sherlock Holmes	Roberts	Episode: "The Case of the Dixon Torpedo"
1972	Budgie	Wossname Walsh	2 episodes
1972	The Protectors	Max Toller	Episode: "See No Evil"
1972	Jackanory Playhouse	Sam Pongo	Episode: "Daft Sam"
1973–1974	Whatever Happened to the Likely Lads?	Terry Collier	All 27 episodes
1973	Play for Today	Husband	Episode: "Making the Play"
1973	Oranges & Lemons	Arthur	Episode: "A Funny Kind of Joke"
1974	Armchair Theatre	Charlie	Episode: "If You Could See What I Can See"
1975	The Philanthropist	Don	TV film
1976–1981	When the Boat Comes In	Jack Ford	48 episodes
1978	Armchair Thriller	Mark Omney	All 6 episodes of The Limbo Connection
1979–1982	Only When I Laugh	Roy Figgis	All 29 episodes
1983	Shades of Darkness	Arthur Frode	Episode: "The Maze"
1983	Macbeth	Porter	TV film
1985	The Beiderbecke Affair	Trevor Chaplin	All 6 episodes
1986–1988	Room at the Bottom	Nesbitt Gunn	All 13 episodes
1987	Father Matthew's Daughter	Father Matthew	All 6 episodes
1987	The Beiderbecke Tapes	Trevor Chaplin	Both 2 episodes
1988	Andy Capp	Andy Capp	All 6 episodes
1988	The Beiderbecke Connection	Trevor Chaplin	All 4 episodes
1990	Screen One	Glyn	Episode: "Sticky Wickets"
1991–1994	Second Thoughts	Bill MacGregor	All 49 episodes
1995	Eleven Men Against Eleven	Ted Whitehead	TV film
1997	Have Your Cake and Eat It	Nat Oliver	All 4 episodes
1997	The Missing Postman	Clive Peacock	TV film
1998	The Stalker's Apprentice	Helmut Kranze	TV film
1998	Out of Sight	Kevin Higgins	Episode: "A Gottle of Geer"
1999	Midsomer Murders	Ron Pringle	Episode: "Death of a Stranger"
2000	Pay and Display	Sydney Street	All 6 episodes
2000	Dirty Tricks	Moss	TV film
2000	Victoria Wood with All the Trimmings	Various	TV film
2000	Close and True	Graham True	All 6 episodes
2002	Harold Shipman: Doctor Death	Harold Shipman	TV film
2002	Bedtime	Ronnie Stribling	Episode: #2.3
2002	Dalziel and Pascoe	Father Leonard Tibbings	Episode: "Sins of the Fathers"
2002–2005	Born and Bred	Arthur Gilder	22 episodes
2003–2015	New Tricks	Jack Halford	69 episodes
2004	He Knew He Was Right	Mr. Crump	Episode: "Part 4"
2006	The Afternoon Play	Billy	Episode: "The Last Will and Testament of Billy Two-Sheds"
2006	The Plot Against Harold Wilson	Harold Wilson	TV film
2007	Celebration	Matt	TV film
2009–2014	Grandpa in My Pocket	Grandpa	Main role
2009	The Last Days of Lehman Brothers	Ken Lewis	TV film
2011	Made in Wales	Baz	Episode: "Tentboy"
2012	Just Around the Corner	Mick	TV film
2016	Cold Feet	Harry Matthews	2 episodes
2022	Marriage	Gerry	3 episodes
2022	The Cleaner	Dad	Episode: "A Cleaner Christmas"
2023	Sanditon	Sir Rowleigh Pryce	6 episodes
2023	All Creatures Great and Small	Mr. Dakin	Episode: "Carpe Diem"
2024	Wartime Christmas	Himself as narrator	Episode: Channel 5
