= Grandpa in My Pocket =

Television series

- Genre: Children's; Comedy drama Educational; Fantasy
- Created by: Mellie Buse and Jan Page
- Inspired by: Ron Spencer
- Developed by: Mellie Buse and Jan Page
- Written by: Mellie Buse and Jan Page
- Directed by: Richard Bradley, Martin Franks and Iain McLean
- Starring: James Bolam; Jay Ruckley; Josie Cable; Zara Ramm; Sam Ellis; Harvey Thorn; Sezen Djouma
- Narrated by: Jay Ruckley; Harvey Thorn; Sezen Djouma
- Theme music composer: Kate Edgar
- Composer: Matt Dilley
- Country of origin: United Kingdom
- Original language: English
- No. of series: 4
- No. of episodes: 118

Production
- Executive producers: Sarah Colclough (BBC); Angus Fletcher (Adastra); Michael Towner (CBeebies)
- Producers: Mellie Buse; Jan Page
- Running time: 12 minutes
- Production company: Adastra Creative Ltd.

Original release
- Network: CBeebies
- Release: 10 February 2009 – 21 October 2014

Grandpa in My Pocket is a British children's comedy-drama television series created by Mellie Buse and Jan Page and commissioned by Michael Carrington for CBeebies, the BBC's dedicated pre-school and nursery channel targeting children aged 2–7 years.

Based on the 1970s The Dandy comic adventure strip Peter's Pocket Grandpa by Ron Spencer (which itself was based on an earlier prose text story called Jimmie's Pocket Grandpa which had appeared in The Dandy in the 1940s), the programme stars James Bolam as a grandfather who owns a magical "shrinking cap", which only his 10-year-old grandson Jason Mason (played by Jay Ruckley) knows about. This cap enables him to shrink to about 4 inches tall, become a CGI-animated character, run very fast, and bring toys and objects to life. This allows him to experience many adventures which are narrated by Jason, including finding a prisoner under the floorboards, bringing a home-made robot to life, and driving Jason's toy car and biplane. The programme also stars Josie Cable, Zara Ramm and Sam Ellis, as Jason's sister, mother and father, respectively. According to the BBC press office, "Grandpa in My Pocket explores the hugely important relationship between grandchildren and grandparents by turning it on its head".

Following the success of the first series in April 2009, a second was commissioned in March 2010, with a third filmed in 2011. After the third series, the series was assumed to have ended, but two years later, a fourth series went into production, and began broadcast in 2014.

The fourth series introduces some changes to the plot. Jason, who is now a teenager, has moved with his family into a windmill which they have opened as a hotel. Jason and Jemima's younger cousins Josh and Elsie (played by Harvey Thorn and Sezen Djouma) have come to stay for the summer, and the two become the series narrators as Grandpa decides to let them in on the secret of the shrinking cap.

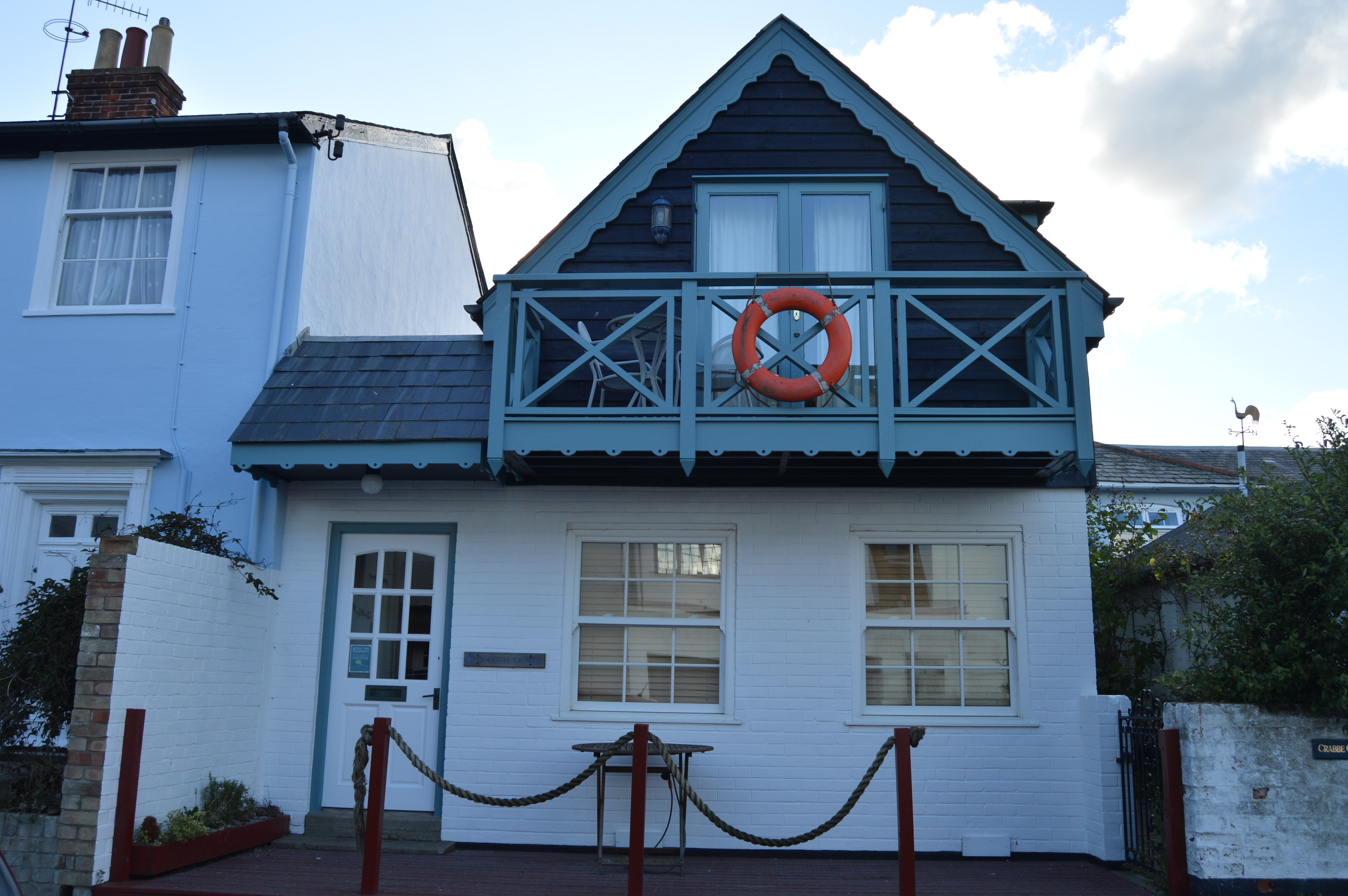
Aldeburgh house used in the show

== Production ==
The first three series of the show were set in fictional location called "Sunnysands". The exterior scenes were filmed on location in the towns of Southwold and Aldeburgh, in Suffolk. The Mason's house was in Crabbe Street, Aldeburgh. The pier and the lighthouse were in Southwold. The bike and other shops were in Walberswick.

The Masons' windmill for the fourth series is Cley Windmill, located in Cley next the Sea in Norfolk.

== Cast ==
=== Main cast ===
- James Bolam as Jeremy Mason/Grandpa (S1-4)
- Jay Ruckley as Jason Mason (S1-4)
- Harvey Thorn as Josh (S4)
- Sezen Djouma as Elsie (S4)

=== Additional cast ===
- Sam Ellis as Christopher Mason (S1-4)
- Zara Ramm as Julie Mason (S1-4)
- Josie Cable as Jemima Mason (S1-S4)
- Susan Jameson as Great Aunt Loretta (S1-4)
- Tinkerbell c/o Martin Winfield as Beowulf/Wulfy(S1-4)
- Phil Gallagher as Mr Liker Biker (S1-3)
- Shaheen Jafargholi as Troy (S1)
- David Davies as Troy's Dad (S1 E7)
- Heather Williams as Miss Snip
- Steve Elias as Mr Whoops (S1-4)
- Simon Lys as Mr Hackit
- Lorna Laidlaw as Miss Smiley (S1-4)
- Holly Ferris as Hazel
- Euan Brown as Eryk
- Alan McMahon as Mr Mentor (S2-4)
- Adrian Truss as Additional Voices
- Sarah Ovens as Amelie
- Gus McQuillin as Hughie Harper
- Todd Kramer as Mr Martian Mortar
- Meera Syal as Mrs Pointy Pencil (S1 E23)

== Characters ==
=== The Family ===
- Grandpa Jeremy Mason (James Bolam) – Jason, Josh, Elsie and Jemima's maternal grandfather, is what most people see as an ordinary Grandpa, but he is in possession of a magic shrinking cap whose secret is only known by Jason, Josh and Elsie. He is the oldest member and leader of the Mason family.
- Jason Mason (Jay Ruckley) – The main character for the first three series. Starting out as ten years old, he alone has knowledge about Grandpa's shrinking cap and often has to deal with the trouble it leads to. In the fourth series, he becomes a teenager.
- Josh Mason (Harvey Thorn) – Jason and Jemima's younger cousin and Elsie's older brother.
- Elsie Mason (Sezen Djouma) – Jason and Jemima's younger cousin and Josh's younger sister.
- Julie ‘Jules’ Mason (Zara Ramm) – Known as Auntie Jules to Josh and Elsie, she is Jason and Jemima's mother, Christopher's wife and Grandpa's daughter.
- Christopher John ‘CJ’ Mason (Sam Ellis) – Known as Uncle CJ to Josh and Elsie, he is Jason and Jemima's father, Julie's husband and Grandpa's son-in-law who works in a bicycle shop. He is quite forgetful and is a typical clueless dad.
- Jemima Mason (Josie Cable) – Jason's older sister. In the fourth series, she in college and has begun a fashion course.
- Great Aunt Loretta (Susan Jameson) – Grandpa's bossy, mean and loudmouthed younger sister who often comes to stay, cooks gross dishes, such as sausages and sardine sauce, and kipper and marmalade sandwiches, and constantly drinks spinach and sprout shake (nicknamed Green Gloop).
- Beowulf (Tinkerbell), also known as Wolfy – Grandpa's Yorkshire Terrier.

=== Series 1–3 ===
- Mr. Whoops (Steve Elias) – The accident-prone owner of Sunnysands Toy Shop. He is the husband of Miss Smiley.
- Troy (Shaheen Jafargholi) – The spiteful and rude neighbour of the Mason family. He only appeared in the first series.
- Troy's Dad (David Davies) – He only appeared in one episode of the first series.
- Miss Smiley (Lorna Laidlaw) – The happy-go-lucky owner of the Sunnysands café. She is married to Mr. Whoops.
- Mr. Liker-Biker (Phil Gallagher) – The optimistic local biker who is more interested in the gear than actually cycling.
- Lady Prigsbottom (Liza Goddard) – A highly demanding, rich and posh woman.
- Princess Purpelovna (Rula Lenska) – A celebrity film star. She only appeared in one episode of the first series.
- Igor (David Kendall) – Princess Purpelovna's chauffeur.
- Mr. Krumpgrumble (Brian Herring) – A taste tester.
- Miss Snip (Heather Williams) – A dog groomer.
- Baby Boris (Izaak Jameson-Lys)
- Mr. Hackitt (Simon Lys) – A gardener.
- Josh (Arthur Byrne)
- Bubbles (Elizabeth Franks) – Jason and Jemima's bubbly and kind-hearted babysitter.
- Mr. Marvelloso (David Lloyd) – A rude and unkind magician.
- Rick the Rocking Raver (David Straun) – A musician.
- Cousin Alvin (Harry Jackson) – Jason and Jemima's older cousin.
- Miss Pointy-Pencil (Meera Syal) – An art teacher.
- Speedie Edie (Alex Tregear) – A champion cyclist.
- Horatio Heave Ho (David Rintoul) – A pirate.
- Captain Shipshape (Alex Jennings) – The captain of a big cruise ship.
- Mrs Maridadi (Vivien Heilbron) – A dressmaker.
- Rodger Splodger (Sanjeev Bhaskar) – A painter.
- Mr. Mentor (Alan McMahon) – A wacky inventor who creates words as well as contraptions.
- Grandad Gilbert (Geoffrey Palmer) – Grandpa's childhood best friend.
- Dora (Maia Tamrakar) – Jason's doll-obsessed friend.
- Shanay (Paaras Bhardwaj) – A shy boy who is friends with Jason and Jemima.
- Floyd (Luke Perry) – The Masons' neighbour; a rude, mischievous and boastful young boy who loves showing off his stuff and goes to Jason's school. He replaces Troy.
- Max (Benjamin Greaves-Neal) – Jason and Jemima's younger cousin.
- Izzy (Ellie Ruiz) – Jason and Jemima's friend.
- Mrs McWhiskit – A famous TV chef, who has her own cooking show.
- Brenda Balderdash (Maggie Ollerenshaw)
- Bernard Balderdash (Geoff Leesley)
- Madame Vibrato (Anne Reid) – An opera singing teacher.
- Lenora (Sian Thomas) – An explorer.
- Tiffany Jayne Grottington Pump (Flavia Cheeseman) – Jemima's snobby new best friend.
- Squeak (Tommy) – A kitten belonging to Bubbles the babysitter.
- Mr. Scoffbucket (Oscar) – A goat belonging to Mum's friend.

=== Series 4 ===
- Olga Orbit (Emilia Fox) – An astronomer.
- Belinda Lucinda – A girl who is mean to other children.
- Connor – Josh's friend.
- Mr. Yomper Stomper – An adventurer who forgets why he was at the Mill on the Marsh.
- Teddy Goodchild – A toddler who appeared in the episode "Squeak! Squeak! Mr Squeak".
- Mr. Squeak – A toy mouse owned by Teddy.
- Bella la Belter (Elain Llwyd) – A famous pop singer who Jason has a crush on.

== Episodes ==
=== Series 1 (2009) ===
No. overall	No. in series	Title	Original release date
1	1	"Beowulf the Brilliant"	10 February 2009
Great Aunt Loretta thinks that Grandpa's dog Beowulf is "Bothersome" and suggests that he should be sold to a dog's home. When she gets stuck in a window, it's Beowulf the Brilliant to the rescue, with a little teamwork from Grandpa and Jason.
2	2	"How to Handle a Hamster"	11 February 2009
Jemima loses her class hamster, Julian. It's up to Grandpa to shrink down and find it.
3	3	"Mr Liker Biker's Big Mountain Mission"	12 February 2009
Grandpa, pretending to be a magic Bike, helps Mr Liker-Biker gain confidence in the charity bike race.
4	4	"The Robot to Beat all Robots"	13 February 2009
Troy ends up purchasing a robot Jason wanted to save up for. He soon gets jealous of Jason's new "talking" robot (in reality created by Grandpa) and takes it. However, Grandpa has his idea of coming back and teaching Troy a lesson.
5	5	"Princess Purpelovna's Plan"	16 February 2009
A rich and snobby visitor to Sunnysands has a plan to make the "Terrible, Old" town a better place - to purchase the town outright and paint it purple like her. Grandpa must prove to her that the town is best left as is.
6	6	"Mr Krumpgrumble's Visit"	17 February 2009
A strict critic from the town hall comes into Miss Smiley's cafe, threatening to close the place down if she does not get five stars.
7	7	"The Most Splendiferous Sandcastle in Sunnysands"	18 February 2009
Grandpa and Jason make up a plan to create an amazing sandcastle for a competition, but when Troy notices the finished result, he wants the castle to be re-constructed his way.
8	8	"A Fabulous Family Photo"	19 February 2009
Mum wants to take a perfect Family Photo, but trouble lies in the form of Great Aunt Loretta, who has brought a dog groomer to groom Beowulf to the way she wants him.
9	9	"Miss Smiley's Summer Show"	20 February 2009
It's the evening of Miss Smiley's Summer Show at her cafe. Jason does not feel comfortable learning the song he sang without Grandpa after Mum will not let him come, but with the shrinking cap, Grandpa helps him gain confidence in singing.
10	10	"The Wonderful World of Mr Whoops"	23 February 2009
Mr Whoops is holding a special day on the beach complete with a puppet show.
11	11	"Chaos in the Café"	24 February 2009
Mr. Whoops is left in charge of the cafe, which means trouble. Grandpa decides to help him make sure that he does not cause any whoopsies.
12	12	"The Day the Baby Came to Stay"	25 February 2009
The family is looking after Baby Boris while his parents are at a wedding. Grandpa tries to find a way to entertain him.
13	13	"A Garden Full of Beasts"	26 February 2009
Great Aunt Loretta hires a gardener - Mr. Hackett, to help decorate the garden. Grandpa is on the verge to stop him.
14	14	"A Toy for a Boy called Troy"	27 February 2009
Miss Smiley and Troy visit Mr Whoops' shop, but Troy's manners are not quite lovely in choosing what to get.
15	15	"Trouble for Bubbles"	2 March 2009
Jason's babysitter - Bubbles, is babysitting Jason and his friend Josh, but when Troy arrives - it's trouble for Bubbles.
16	16	"Shake Up and Shape Up"	3 March 2009
When Mum gets into a "Shake Up and Shape Up" routine, Grandpa and Jason help Mr Whoops dance without causing any whoopsies.
17	17	"Mr Marvelloso's Magic Show"	4 March 2009
It's Jemima's birthday and a magician has been hired to perform a show. Grandpa wants to prove otherwise, which may come in use when Mr Marvelloso "magics" Jamima's watch away.
18	18	"A Tuneful Toot on a Trumpet"	5 March 2009
Mum gets into yet another hobby - trumpeting, although she is not good at it. Grandpa wants to help her in performing it.
19	19	"Getting Aunt Loretta Better"	6 March 2009
Jason and Grandpa want to go to the beach, but Great Aunt Loretta comes into the house overreacting over a simple tummy ache. Jason and Grandpa try to help her to get her mind off the tummy ache and let her go to a concert.
20	20	"Sweet Dreams for Cousin Alvin"	9 March 2009
Jason's cousin Alvin has come to visit. Jason and Grandpa think he is as nice and lovely as he was when he was younger, but he is now a greedy and lazy teenager. It is up to Grandpa to turn him back into the lovely self he once was.
21	21	"Something to Treasure Forever"	10 March 2009
Mum gets a necklace for her birthday, but she loses it. Grandpa is on the case to rescue it, but Great Aunt Loretta does not make it easy for him.
22	22	"A Saturday Full of Surprises"	11 March 2009
Grandpa and Jason are not thrilled to have the miserable grumpy Great Aunt Loretta looking after them, so they find a way to make her laugh.
23	23	"Magic in the Air"	12 March 2009
It's the day of the art club, but the artist is quite boring and more focused on the pencils. Grandpa goes to bring some magic in the air.
24	24	"Nothing Stops Grandpa"	13 March 2009
On a lovely bike ride day, Jason knows very well that nothing stops Grandpa when he is small - and flying a kite.
25	25	"Grandpa's Busy Bee Day"	16 March 2009
Jason has a sore throat, and Great Aunt Loretta forces him to rest in his room. Grandpa is on the verge to help him.
26	26	"Captain Dumbletwit's Spaceship Cake"	17 March 2009
It's Grandpa's Birthday, and he is given a special spaceship cake, but Great Aunt Loretta wants a piece of the action.

=== Series 2 (2010) ===
1. "Captain Dumbletwit's Toughest Mission Yet!" (15 February 2010) Grandpa's old childhood friend comes to visit, Grandpa finds out he's lost his imagination. Dressed as Captain Dumbletwit, Grandpa hopes to bring back his joy.
2. "Mr Mentor's Custard Puff Plopper" (16 February 2010) When Mr. Mentor drops by on his way to a conference, Grandpa sets out to fix his newest invention, which is complicated by Great Aunt Loretta.
3. "No Two Rings the Same" (17 February 2010) Mr. Liker Biker complicates things for Dad when he's overworked with orders for Mr. Mentor's newest invention.
4. "A Carrot Called Christopher and Other Odd Vegetables" (18 February 2010) Grandpa and Jason set out to stop Great Aunt Loretta from cooking Mum's vegetables to impress Mr. Mentor.
5. "Taking Floyd for a Ride" (19 February 2010)
6. "Trying to Play with Shy Shanay" (22 February 2010) Jemima is babysitting a boy named Shanay, but Grandpa helps to bring him out of his shell.
7. "A Day for a Play at Miss Smiley's Café" (23 February 2010)
8. "Jemima's New Best Friend" (24 February 2010)
9. "Bubbles and Squeak" (25 February 2010)
10. "No More Dolls for Dora" (26 February 2010)
11. "A Very Needy Speedy Edie" (1 March 2010)
12. "Making the Most of Max" (2 March 2010)
13. "Miss Smiley's Strawberry Surprise" (3 March 2010)
14. "In It to Win It!" (4 March 2010)
15. "Horatio Heave Ho!" (5 March 2010)
16. "Great Aunt Loretta's Not-So-Great Plan" (8 March 2010)
17. "Mr Whoops' Toy of the Week" (9 March 2010)
18. "The Perfect Little Litter Picker" (10 March 2010)
19. "Big Elf, Little Elf" (11 March 2010)
20. "A Song for Miss Smiley" (12 March 2010)
21. "Mr Scoffbucket the Goat" (15 March 2010)
22. "Miss Smiley's Dancing Tea" (16 March 2010) Great Aunt Loretta tries to take control of a dance display at Miss Smiley's cafe. Grandpa to the rescue.
23. "A Sunnysands Tick Tock Shock" (17 March 2010)
24. "Wulfy's Day with Mr Whoops" (18 March 2010)
25. "Captain Shipshape and a Fish Called Bryan" (19 March 2010)
26. "Grandpa's Greatest Escape Ever" (20 March 2010)

=== Series 3 (2010–11) ===
1. "The Magic of Christmas" (15 December 2010) It's Christmas in Sunnysands, and Grandpa is determined to make Great Aunt Loretta realise the spirit of the season.
2. "No Ordinary Pig" (14 February 2011)
3. "Lighthouse View, as Good as New" (15 February 2011) During spring-cleaning, a couple show up and attempt to buy the Mason's house, and with Jason away at his friend's, will Grandpa still save the day?
4. "Boom a Boom Whoop Zing Zoo!" (16 February 2011)
5. "Lenora the Explorer" (17 February 2011) The Mason's join a famous Explorer on an exhibition to find a rare bird.
6. "A Captain Dumbletwit Box of Tricks" (18 February 2011)
7. "No Help for Alvin" (21 February 2011)
8. "Mr Mentor's Marvelicious Inventing Club" (22 February 2011)
9. "More Than a Biscuit for Mrs McWhiskit" (23 February 2011) A famous TV chef comes to Sunnysands to find new recipes, and Grandpa is determined to keep Grest Aunt Loretta from cooking any of her usual disgusting recipes.
10. "A Day to Do What You Like to Do" (24 February 2011) Grandpa and Jason try to help Mr. Liker Biker when his nephew comes to visit, and they struggles to find something he likes.
11. "No Mention of an Invention" (25 February 2011) Grandpa takes action when Mr. Mentor decides to give up inventing.
12. "The Sunnysands School for Pirates" (28 February 2011)
13. "Mr Greator the Creator" (1 March 2011)
14. "Mr Whoops' Wonderful Wedding" (2 March 2011) It's the day of Mr. Whoops' and Miss. Smiley's wedding day. And it's up to Grandpa and Jason to make sure their special day goes smoothly.

=== Series 4 (2014) ===
1. "A Grandpa Made of Magic" (27 January 2014)
2. "Roly Poly Ravioli" (28 January 2014)
3. "Miss Smiley's Springtime Make and Do Day" (29 January 2014)
4. "An Aussie Afternoon with Bob" (30 January 2014)
5. "Squeak! Squeak! Mr Squeak!" (31 January 2014)
6. "A Day in Woolly Wonderland" (3 February 2014)
7. "The Great Big Sunnysands Cake Bake" (4 February 2014)
8. "Mr Munchmould's Cheesy Business" (5 February 2014)
9. "There Came a Big Spider" (6 February 2014)
10. "The Wonderbubble Weather Watcher" (7 February 2014)
11. "Dancing with Delight" (10 February 2014)
12. "Mistress Smiley's Medieval Fairground Fun" (11 February 2014)
13. "Waffling at the Windmill" (12 February 2014)
14. "A Day of Spectacular Surprises" (13 February 2014)
15. "The Day the Callminders Called on Mr Whoops" (14 February 2014)
16. "A Good Old-Fashioned Party" (17 March 2014)
17. "A Cleaning Job for Our Friend Bob" (18 March 2014)
18. "Wulfy the Wonderdog" (19 March 2014)
19. "Billy Bentice the Apprentice" (20 March 2014)
20. "Changes for the Better" (21 March 2014)
21. "Mr Greator is Up to No Good" (24 March 2014)
22. "Best Behaviour for Barnaby" (25 March 2014)
23. "A Souvenir of Sunnysands" (26 March 2014)
24. "Things That Go Bump on a Boat" (27 March 2014)
25. "A Customer in a Fluster" (28 March 2014)
26. "A Mix-up at the Mill" (5 May 2014)
27. "Mr Mentor's Spangly Jangly Dangle Dish" (6 May 2014)
28. "Poorly Pansy Petunia" (7 May 2014)
29. "Mr Yomper Stomper's Donkey Day" (8 May 2014)
30. "Wanda Whoops' World of Whooo!" (9 May 2014)
31. "The Balderdashes on Bob's Boat" (12 May 2014)
32. "One Man's Junk Is Another Man's Treasure" (13 May 2014)
33. "Don't Blame Wulfy" (14 May 2014)
34. "Mr Mentor's Whizzywoodlesome Whirly Windwhooper" (15 May 2014)
35. "The Mystery of the Missing Millions" (16 May 2014)
36. "Cheery Charlie Cheekster's Big Return" (19 May 2014)
37. "Mrs Pufferbang's Balloony Beach Bonanza" (20 May 2014)
38. "Bertie Beep and His Talking Sheep" (21 May 2014)
39. "A Sunnysands Shelter for Bella La Belter" (22 May 2014)
40. "A Robodoggy for Miss Snip" (23 May 2014)
41. "The Brillioso Beach Treat" (6 October 2014)
42. "Great Aunt Loretta on Duty" (7 October 2014)
43. "Mighty Mike and a Bear on a Hike" (8 October 2014)
44. "Great Aunt Loretta's Dream Date" (9 October 2014)
45. "Whizzy William" (10 October 2014)
46. "Shiny Gold Stars" (13 October 2014)
47. "Captain Dumbletwit's Dress-Up Party" (14 October 2014)
48. "In a Muddle with Miss Muddleton" (15 October 2014)
49. "A Day for a Piratey Adventure" (16 October 2014)
50. "The Magic of the Mill on the Marsh" (17 October 2014)
51. "A Passion for Fashion" (20 October 2014)
52. "A Dinosaur Called Damian" (21 October 2014)

== Awards and nominations ==
- BAFTA Children's Awards 2009
- BAFTA Children's Awards 2010
- BAFTA Children's Awards 2011

- Nominated for Best Pre-School Live Action

- BAFTA – Wales 2010

- Winner – Best Children's Programme

== DVD releases ==
In the United Kingdom, the first season was released on DVD by Warner Home Video from 2010 to 2011, with Decode Enterprises securing the deal in July 2009.

Abbey Home Media handled DVD distribution rights to the second and third seasons.
