= Andy Capp (TV series) =

British TV sitcom (1988)

- Genre: Sitcom
- Created by: Reg Smythe
- Starring: James Bolam; Paula Tilbrook
- Country of origin: United Kingdom
- Original language: English
- No. of series: 1
- No. of episodes: 6

Production
- Running time: 30 minutes (including adverts)
- Production company: Thames Television

Original release
- Network: ITV
- Release: 22 February – 28 March 1988

Andy Capp is a British sitcom based on the cartoon Andy Capp. It starred James Bolam and ran for one series in 1988. It was written by Keith Waterhouse. Unusually, for a sitcom at the time, there was neither a studio audience nor a laugh track during the filming of Andy Capp, and was filmed entirely on location. It was made for the ITV network by Thames Television.

== Cast ==
- James Bolam - Andrew "Andy" Capp
- Paula Tilbrook - Flo Capp
- Mike Savage - Bookie
- Keith Smith - Chalkie
- George Waring - Clifford
- John Arthur - Jack
- Jeremy Gittins - Keith
- Andy Mulligan - Meredith
- Ian Bleasdale - Milkie
- Shirley Dixon - Mother-in-law
- Richard Tate - Pawnbroker
- Keith Marsh - Percy
- Susan Brown - Ruby
- Colette Stevenson - Shirley
- Ian Thompson - The Vicar
- Kevin Lloyd - Walter
- Philip Lowrie - Mr Watson

== Plot ==
The sitcom Andy Capp was based on the cartoon strip of the same name that had run since 1957 in The Daily Mirror. Andy Capp is a slothful man from Hartlepool, whose life consists of drinking, sleeping, watching TV, betting, going to the pub and occasionally playing football (as opposed to rugby, which was Andy's sport in the comic strip). His wife, Flo, is constantly annoyed by her lazy husband and frequently uses a rolling pin as a weapon.

== Episodes ==
1. "New Leaf" (22 February 1988)
2. "The Sporting Life" (29 February 1988)
3. "Flo's New Frock!" (7 March 1988)
4. "Love me or leave me?" (14 March 1988)
5. "Economy Drive" (21 March 1988)
6. "The Anniversary Waltz" (28 March 1988)

== DVD release ==
The Complete Series of Andy Capp was released by [Network DVD in the UK (Region 2) on 11 June 2012.
