= Diana Weston =

Canadian-British actress (born 1953)

- Born: Diana Weston; 13 November 1953 (age 72); Toronto, Ontario, Canada
- Occupation: Actress
- Years active: 1975–present
- Notable work: The Upper Hand (1990–1996)
- Partner: Robert Lindsay (1980–1995)
- Children: 1
- Relatives: Charles Basil Price (grandfather)

Diana Weston (born 13 November 1953) is a Canadian-British actress who has appeared on British television since 1975.

== Early life ==
Weston is a grandchild of Canadian Army officer Charles Basil Price.

== Career ==
Her first role was in a 1975 episode of Thriller, and parts in Raffles, The Sweeney, The Professionals, Agony, Shoestring and Bless Me, Father soon followed. She also appeared in the video for the 1984 Ultravox single "Dancing with Tears in My Eyes". Since the late 1980s, she has appeared in The New Statesman, Boon, A Bit of a Do, About Face, Nightingales, Jonathan Creek, Casualty, Emmerdale, My Family, New Tricks and a main role in the 2000 sitcom Pay and Display.

Weston is best known for the role of Caroline in the sitcom The Upper Hand, starring alongside Joe McGann and Honor Blackman, with the show being produced for ITV from 1990 to 1996.

== Personal life ==
Diana Weston had a long relationship with the actor Robert Lindsay, and they had a daughter, Sydney (born 1988), who has also made television appearances. Their relationship ended after Lindsay left her for actress/presenter Rosemarie Ford, although she has continued to work with him on occasion.

== Filmography ==
=== Film ===
Year	Title	Role	Notes
1977	Valentino	2nd Whore	Uncredited
1978	Sweeney 2	Air Hostess	
1981	Riding High	Receptionist	
1984	Ultravox: Dancing with Tears in My Eyes	Midge Ure's wife	Music video short
1989	Bert Rigby, You're a Fool	Young Mrs. Rigby	American musical film
1993	Meetings Bloody Meetings		Short
2012	Dealing	Joan	Short
2013	Resting	Sylvia	Short
2016	Halcyon Heights	Helen	
2019	Engaged	Patricia	Short
2020	Lucky Break	Lady	Short

=== Television ===
Year	Title	Role	Notes
1975	Thriller	Helen Wiles	TV series, 1 episode
1976	Star Maidens	Guard	TV series, 1 episode
1977	Raffles	Lady Alice	TV series, 1 episode
1977	BBC2 Play of the Week	Cynthia	TV series, 1 episode
1978	The Professionals	Ruth, CI5 Girl	TV series, 3 episodes
1978	The Sweeney	WPC Janet Reynolds	TV series, 1 episode
1978	Target	Girl in Antique Market	TV series, 1 episode
1979	Shoestring	Chrissie	TV series, 1 episode
1979	The Cannon and Ball Show	Mrs. Paige's Secretary	TV series, 1 episode
1979	The Deep Concern	Information Girl	TV series, 2 episodes
1979	Hazell	Marilyn	TV series, 1 episode
1979–1981	Agony	Val Dunn	TV series, 18 episodes
1980	Leave it to Charlie	Gloria Murphy	TV series, 1 episode
1981–1982	Kelly Monteith		TV series, 3 episodes
1981	Zanussi – The Appliance of Science	Woman asking questions	Uncredited, television advertisement
1981	Bless Me, Father	Land Girl	TV series, 1 episode
1982	Metal Mickey	Waitress	TV series, 1 episode
1982	A Kind of Loving	Fleur Dunham	TV series, 2 episodes
1982	Squadron	Sally Briley	TV series, 1 episode
1983	Cuffy	Claudia Millington	TV series, 1 episode
1984	Cold Warrior	Laura de Vere	TV series, 1 episode
1985–1986	Troubles and Strife	Fiona	TV series, 13 episodes
1985	Hold the Back Page	Roz Knight	TV mini-series, 1 episode
1985	Me and My Girl	Portland MacIntyre	TV series, 1 episode
1986	As the World Turns	Amy	TV series, 1 episode
1986	Fairly Secret Army	Jill	TV series, 5 episodes
1986	Strong Medicine	Jane	TV movie
1987	The New Statesman	Edie Guzzler	TV series, 5 episodes
1989	About Face	Jessica	TV series, 1 episode
1989	A Bit of a Do	Corinna Price-Rodgerson	TV series, 3 episodes
1989	Boon	Angela Hipkiss	TV series, 1 episode
1989	Surgical Spirit	Sammy Eldridge	TV series, 1 episode
1989	A Fine Romance	Lydia Eastman	TV series, 1 episode
1990–1996	The Upper Hand	Caroline Wheatley	TV series, 95 episodes
1990	Nightingales	Miss Angela Wilson	TV series, 1 episode
1995	An Independent Man	Brenda McKenna	TV series, 2 episodes
1997	Melissa	Hope Magenta	TV mini-series, 5 episodes
1999	Jonathan Creek	Delia Masson	TV series, 1 episode "The Eyes of Tiresias"
2000	Pay and Display	Miss Cummins	TV series, 1 episode
2004	Casualty	Mavis Taylor	TV series, 3 episodes
2006	Emmerdale	Sian Prosser	TV series, 1 episode
2007	My Family	Charlie Briggs	TV series, 1 episode
2008	New Tricks	Jane Morley	TV series, 1 episode
2013, 2019, 2021	Doctors	Cindy Soames (2013) / Marie Rosco (2019) / Janet Bolt (2021)	TV series, 3 episodes
2016	Resting	Sylvia Northrup	TV series, 1 episode
2020	Hollyoaks	Carole Kelly	TV series, 2 episodes
