= Juliet Aykroyd =

British actress and writer

Juliet Aykroyd is a British actress and writer, born in India.

She studied at Oxford University, and graduated from the Royal Academy of Dramatic Art in 1968.

She played Anthea, Thelma's assistant at the library, in Whatever Happened to the Likely Lads?, and Linda in Open All Hours.

She retired from acting to bring up her family, and later concentrated on writing, particularly stage plays.

Her works include a play about Robert Fitzroy, captain of the Beagle, which has been performed under various titles, including Darwin & Fitzroy and The Ostrich and the Dolphin.
