= Deborah Chancellor =

English writer

Deborah Helen Chancellor (née Mowbray born 7 July 1966) is an English writer; to date, she has written over 70 books.

== Background ==
Chancellor (née Mowbray) is the second of four girls. She attended The Broxbourne School, Hertfordshire, from 1977 to 1984. She read Modern & Medieval Languages at Newnham College, Cambridge from 1985-1988.

== Writing career ==
Chancellor writes fiction and non-fiction for children. Her work includes Harriet Tubman (A&C Black, 2013), Code Breakers (Barrington Stoke, 2009), Escape from Colditz (Barrington Stoke, 2007) and two collections of illustrated children's stories, I love reading Phonics (Octopus Publishing, 2012) and Reading Heroes (Parragon, 2008). She has adapted 365 stories from The Bible (Children's Everyday Bible, Dorling Kindersley, 2002).

Chancellor's non-fiction ranges from historical biography to topical issues (Moving to Britain, Franklin Watts, 2008) to matters of general interest (Everything You Need to Know, Kingfisher, 2007).

In December 2012 she appeared in the BBC's Christmas University Challenge.

Chancellor lives near Cambridge with her husband, three children and dog.

== Awards ==
Being a Vegetarian (2009) won the UK section for the Gourmand World Cookbook awards in the vegetarian book category and came second in the world category.

In 2012 Chancellor was part of the Newnham College, Cambridge, team that took part in a special Christmas edition of University Challenge.

== Literary Fellow ==
From 2009-2011 Chancellor was a fellow of the Royal Literary Fund at Newnham College, Cambridge.

== Selected bibliography ==
Harriet Tubman : A&C Black 2013
The Perfect Rebel: Emily Wilding Davison : Barrington Stoke 2010
The Amazon Time Capsules : OUP 2009
Muddy Paws and the Birthday Party : Parragon 2009
Captain Blackbear's Crew : Parragon 2009
Stage School Stars : Parragon 2009
Codebreakers : Barrington Stoke 2009
Space Stories : Parragon 2008
Wacky Workers : Parragon 2008
Spy Stories : Parragon 2008
Detective Stories : Parragon 2008
Escape from Colditz : Barrington Stoke 2007
Everyday Bible : Dorling Kindersley 2002
A Child's First Bible : Dorling Kindersley 2002
The Story of Jonah : Dorling Kindersley 2002
Noah's Ark : Dorling Kindersley 1999
The Christmas Story : Dorling Kindersley 1999
