= Pay and Display (TV series) =

2000 British TV series

- Genre: Sitcom
- Starring: James Bolam; Matt Bardock; Diana Weston; Pearce Quigley
- Country of origin: United Kingdom
- Original language: English
- No. of series: 1
- No. of episodes: 6

Production
- Running time: 30 minutes
- Production companies: Lawless Films; Carlton Television

Original release
- Network: ITV
- Release: 12 July – 10 August 2000

Pay And Display is a British sitcom starring James Bolam that lasted one series. It was written by Dominic English.

== Cast ==
- James Bolam - Sydney Street
- Matt Bardock - Danny Weir
- Gerald Home - Vicar
- Diana Weston - Miss Cummings
- Pearce Quigley - Adolf

== Plot ==
Set in an underground car-park, this sitcom mainly focuses around the banter between the two car-park attendants, Sydney and Danny. Sydney spends much of his time talking about past times with his wife, Maureen (who is never seen), while Danny goes on about the opposite sex. Their boss, Miss Cummings, is a no-nonsense woman. Adolf, the traffic warden, also regularly pops in, and thinks of himself as a political activist.

== Episodes ==
1. "Doctor's Orders" (12 July 2000)
2. "Father's Day" (13 July 2000)
3. "An Ill Windfull" (20 July 2000)
4. "Wedding Belles" (27 July 2000)
5. "The Italian Job" (3 August 2000)
6. "A Change Is As Good..." (10 August 2000)
