= The Likely Lads (film) =

1976 British comedy film directed by Michael Tuchner

- UK theatrical release poster
- Directed by: Michael Tuchner
- Written by: Dick Clement; Ian La Frenais
- Produced by: Aida Young
- Starring: Rodney Bewes; James Bolam; Brigit Forsyth
- Cinematography: Tony Imi
- Edited by: Ralph Sheldon
- Music by: Mike Hugg
- Production company: Anglo-EMI
- Distributed by: Anglo-EMI
- Release date: 8 April 1976
- Running time: 90 minutes
- Country: United Kingdom
- Language: English
- Budget: less than £300,000

The Likely Lads is a 1976 British comedy film directed by Michael Tuchner, starring James Bolam and Rodney Bewes. It is a spin-off from Whatever Happened to the Likely Lads?, although it has the same title as the earlier 1960s British television series The Likely Lads, of which Whatever was the sequel.

The screenplay is by the scriptwriters of the television show, Dick Clement and Ian La Frenais; and the principal roles of Bob and Terry, as well as those of Bob's wife Thelma and Terry's sister Audrey, are played by the original television cast.

This film was the final screen appearance of Bewes and Bolam together. At the time of the film's release, the two had, according to Bewes, fallen out over something he had said in an interview with the press and never spoken to each other again, but when Bewes died in November 2017, Bolam denied there was a rift between the two men.

== Plot ==
An opening pre-credits sequence shows events which led to the conception of both "Lads" during a Second World War air raid. After the opening titles, Bob and Terry, both aged about thirty, are seen playing football with some boys on a patch of rough ground, which leads to Bob having to be rescued from a high roof by the fire brigade.

Later, Bob and Terry visit their favourite pub, the Fat Ox, which is about to be demolished, along with the surrounding terraced housing where both used to live. The now middle-class Bob feels great sentimentality for this loss, whereas Terry, who is now living in a newly built high-rise council flat, is more optimistic about the city's redevelopment, pointing out that he now has a "modern kitchen, a lovely view and an inside lavatory". Terry has just received his final divorce decree from his wife in West Germany and is looking forward to a bright future, whereas Bob has become ambivalent about his married life with Thelma and their social activities together.

Terry soon begins a relationship with Chris, a Finnish woman who works at the local boutique, of whom Bob is openly envious. Thelma sees this as an opportunity to get Terry married and settled down, thus removing the threat to her marriage which she perceives Terry as representing. In her pursuit of this, Thelma insists the four of them go away on a caravanning holiday in Northumberland; but while Thelma and Chris are enjoying the trip, Bob and Terry do not, so early one morning, they hitch up the caravan, with the girls still asleep in it, and set off to drive home. While they are stopped at traffic lights in a small town, Thelma and Chris wake up and get out and Bob drives away before they can get back in, stranding them in front of the congregation heading into a church. Bob and Terry pick up two young female hitchhikers, until, while stopped at a filling station, they discover Thelma and Chris are not in the caravan. They abandon the hitchhikers and frantically retrace their route to rejoin Thelma and Chris.

As a result of the trip, Terry and Chris split up, and Bob and Thelma separate. Bob decides to stay temporarily at Terry's, but Terry is now busy seducing Iris, a colleague of Chris, and Bob unwittingly walks in on their lovemaking, so he leaves. Both Bob and Thelma come to believe the other is having an affair and have a furious argument in the back of Terry's employer's van while he is working as an advertising demonstrator of a washing powder. Unbeknownst to them, the van's public address system is still switched on, broadcasting their argument to the neighbourhood. Terry loses his job because of this incident.

Bob and Terry drive to Whitley Bay for a weekend break and take a room in a bed and breakfast. Bob promptly dates the landlady's daughter, whilst Terry is seduced by the landlady. When the landlady, suspicious of her daughter, enters her bedroom, Bob has to make a quick getaway through the bedroom window. The same then happens to Terry, with the daughter walking in on him in bed with her mother. Bob and Terry both find themselves in the garden without their trousers. But when the landlady goes down to the front door to let Terry back in, it is Bob who enters, without his trousers, causing her to protest loudly and threaten to call the police. The two lads make a hasty, trouserless departure in Bob's car. They return to Terry's flat, only to find Thelma and Terry's sister Audrey there, and their inability to explain the absence of their trousers does not help to resolve Bob and Thelma's problems.

Taking Audrey's advice, Terry makes plans to emigrate and signs on as a deckhand aboard a ship leaving Newcastle docks, and the two lads spend his last night in England drinking on board the ship and commiserating with each other. At the last moment, Terry decides not to go and disembarks, but Bob falls asleep on board and awakes in a lifeboat to discover the ship has sailed. Terry explains to Thelma that they will realise Bob is on board by mistake and let him off at the first port of call, Bahrain.

== Cast ==
- Rodney Bewes as Bob Ferris
- James Bolam as Terry Collier
- Brigit Forsyth as Thelma Ferris
- Mary Tamm as Christina
- Sheila Fearn as Audrey Collier
- Zena Walker as Laura
- Anulka Dziubinska as Dawn
- Alun Armstrong as milkman
- Judy Buxton as Iris
- Vicki Michelle as Glenys
- Penny Irving as Sandy
- Michelle Newell as Alice Ferris
- Gordon Griffin as Cyril Collier
- Susan Tracy as Edith Collier
- Roger Avon as Joe the landlord
- Ronald Lacey as Ernie
- Elizabeth Lax as Wendy
- Linda Robson as Marcia
- Ian McDiarmid as vicar
- Eric Mason as truck driver

== Production ==
The film had been planned even before Whatever Happened to the Likely Lads?.

The film was greenlit by Nat Cohen of EMI Films. Cohen had enjoyed a deal of success making films of popular British TV series. EMI had an arrangement with Thames Television. It was announced in 1975 as part of a slate of films worth £6 million including adaptations of The Likely Lads and The Sweeney plus Aces High, Spanish Fly and Evil Under the Sun. Bewes claimed that Cohen called him to announce that finance was in place for a film version.

Clement and La Frenais had to remain in the United States during filming and so were unable to visit the set. They said there were extensive rewrites on the insistence of James Bolam.

=== Locations ===
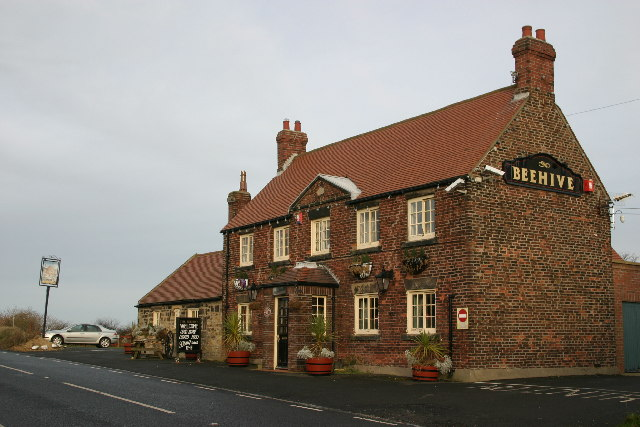
The Beehive pub was used in filming.

The film was made at EMI's Elstree Studios in Hertfordshire and on location on Tyneside, in and around Newcastle and Whitley Bay. Locations used include the Spanish City funfair at Whitley Bay, the Beehive public house, the Coast Road (A1058) flats and Tynemouth Pier.

- Terry's fictional employer, "Extralite" washing powder, was filmed at Greggs Christon Road Dept in Gosforth
- Terry's works depot was filmed at the former George Angus site on the Coast Road, Wallsend. It has since been demolished and B&Q now occupy the site.
- Terry's flat was at Taunton Close, Willington Square, Wallsend. This was one of three blocks of flats which were locally referred to as the "fourteen stories" and stood on the south side of the A1058 "Coast Road" opposite the George Angus engineering works. They were demolished in the 1990s.
- The church where Thelma and Chris are abandoned is in Corbridge, Northumberland. The road layout is the same but the road is now a one-way system with traffic flow in the opposite direction to that depicted in the film.
- The caravan trip takes place across Tyne Bridge and through Rothbury, Northumberland
- The caravan site and "The Beehive" pub - Earsdon, and Whitley Bay Caravan Park near St Mary's Lighthouse. It was known as "Feathers Caravan Park"
- Bob gets some flowers trapped in the bus after Terry does a "voice of above" on him on Market Street in Newcastle upon Tyne. The area is now heavily pedestrianised.
- The coast - Whitley Bay
- Wallsend High Street - where Bob crosses the zebra crossing in front of Terry's van. The Greenwood's store was still there on the corner of Atkinson Terrace until they went into liquidation in 2019.
- City Road on the Quayside is where Bob is rescued from the roof of the building.
- Borehamwood Library is where Thelma has the brick dropped on her foot. It has since been demolished and replaced with a new building.
- The dual carriageway where Bob and Terry pick up the two hitchhikers and later drive over the central reservation to chase the truck giving Thelma a lift is Hertford Road A414 between Hatfield and roundabout with B155.
- The "Extralite" washing powder demonstration ("Radio Free Ferris") sequence was filmed at the junction of Links Drive and Park Crescent in Borehamwood.
- The Black Horse pub is the Collingwood pub in Jesmond.
- The bed and breakfast, known in the film as Ivanhoe, where they were thrown out of, is on the Links, Whitley Bay. The Briar Dene pub is just visible in the background as they draw up in the car.
- The Total petrol station was at the intersection of Harmondsworth Road and Holloway Lane, Hillingdon, London, next to Heathrow Airport. The site is currently owned by Shell.

== Release ==
The film premiered at the ABC 1 cinema in Newcastle on 8 April 1976, attended by the film's writers and most of the cast. James Bolam did not attend as he was performing Treats at the Mayfair Theatre in London.

According to Bewes' memoir in 2005, he and Bolam had a falling out after the making of the film over Bewes telling a story to a reporter about Bolam's personal life, and that the two men stopped communicating. However, when Bewes died in November 2017, Bolam denied there had been a rift between the two men.

=== Box office ===
The film was successful at the box office, with the BBC taking much of the revenue as part of the deal. Bewes wrote that he had a percentage of the profits (Bolam did not), and claimed in 2005 that he had not seen any profits.

=== Critical reception ===
Like many film adaptations of British television shows of the 1970s, the film was largely poorly received at the time by the critics, although Arthur Thirkell of the Daily Mirror was positive in his review, commenting, "Films based on TV series rarely transfer successfully to the big screen. The Likely Lads is an exception." He praised the film's "warmly-amusing situations", "crisp dialogue" and "real-life characters".

The Guardian wrote "it looks very much as if everyone concerned has gotten a bit bored."

Madeleline Harmsworth of Sunday Mirror praised it as a "real treat for longtime fans and newcomers", with the "humourous [sic] realism of suburban life in the North-East transfer[ring] happily from TV to film".

Coventry Evening Telegraph felt the film only "magnified the failings of these situation comedy ideas". Later, in 2004 it was given five stars in the Radio Times film guide, and also received good reviews in What's on TV.

According to Sight and Sound, the film "sacrifices the series' observation and comic logic in favour of trouser-dropping farce and a piecemeal narrative. Good lines pop up, but fans would be better served by repeats of the original."

Phil Wickham, who wrote a monograph on The Likely Lads called the movie "largely successful. While it does introduce the inevitable holiday sequence ... the first part of the film and its conclusion expand on the themes of the series. Bob suffers a mid-life crisis and is forced to think through his fears of the future and his struggle for conformity; Terry, meanwhile, flirts with domesticity and is also rehoused to a new, and already decaying, tower block." He added "the film adds to our understanding of the series and forms a fitting end to our acquaintance with the lads."

The film is rated M in New Zealand for sexual themes and is advised as "suitable for mature audiences 16 years and over."

== Notes ==
- Bewes, Rodney (2005). A likely story.
