= Bob Ferris (Likely Lads) =

- The Likely Lads, Whatever Happened to the Likely Lads, The Likely Lads film character
- First appearance: "Entente Cordiale" (The Likely Lads)
- Last appearance: The Likely Lads (film)
- Portrayed by: Rodney Bewes

In-universe information
- Gender: Male
- Occupation: Electrician (formerly); Civil engineer
- Family: Leslie Ferris (father, deceased); Alice Ferris (mother)
- Spouse: Thelma Chambers
- Nationality: British
- Birth date: 22 February 1944

Robert Andrew Scarborough Ferris is a fictional character in British sitcoms The Likely Lads and Whatever Happened to the Likely Lads? and in The Likely Lads film, played by Bingley-born actor Rodney Bewes. He is single in The Likely Lads, marries Thelma Chambers in Whatever Happened to the Likely Lads? and is still married to her in the film. He works as an electrician and later as a civil engineer. Bob is a long-term friend of Terry Collier.

== Early life ==
Bob was conceived in Scarborough (hence his middle name) by unmarried parents, the day before his father was posted to Catterick by the British Army. Sharing his birthdate with entertainer Bruce Forsyth - as we learn in 'Birthday Boy' - Bob was born on 22 February 1944 into a working-class family. Once he started school, he proved to be an impressionable child, on his own being conscientious, but being easily coaxed into trouble by friends, particularly Terry. At an early age Bob and Terry got into mild trouble, stealing Dinky toys from Woolworths and a hosepipe from a care home. Bob left school to become an electrical apprentice with Ellison's Electrical. While serving his apprenticeship, he also attended night school, eventually becoming a qualified electrician. In the last episode of The Likely Lads, he signs up for the British Army but is discharged for having flat feet. Terry, who only signed up in order to be alongside his friend, is accepted, and goes on to serve in Mönchengladbach, West Germany.

== Personality ==
Bob is keener than Terry to mask his working-class roots. After marrying Thelma, Bob aspires to be accepted into the middle class, much to Terry's disgust. Bob enjoys playing badminton with Thelma, but equally enjoys drinking with Terry. He often blames his drinking, smoking and poor diet on Terry. Although that is in part true, Bob needs little persuasion to stay out drinking with Terry rather than going home to his wife.

Bob is hard-working, conscientious, fairly conventional, and (unlike Terry) ambitious, although he is usually in need of guidance in order to achieve his ambitions. However, he is not particularly assertive, which makes him easily led by his headstrong wife Thelma and equally headstrong friend Terry.

Despite Bob's ambition and enjoyment of his new-found status, he has often defended Terry's "down-to-earth" and "unpretentious" ways, on one occasion even offending one of his own and Thelma's friends in order to defend Terry.
