= Terry Collier =

- The Likely Lads, Whatever Happened to the Likely Lads?, The Likely Lads film character
- Terry Collier in Whatever Happened to the Likely Lads?
- First appearance: "Entente Cordiale" (The Likely Lads)
- Last appearance: The Likely Lads
- Portrayed by: James Bolam

In-universe information
- Gender: Male
- Occupation: Electrician; British Army corporal; Hospital porter; Forklift driver; Taxi driver; Mobile salesman
- Family: Cyril Collier (father); Edith Collier (mother); Audrey Collier (sister); Linda Collier (sister)
- Spouse: Jutta Baumgarten (m. 1969; div. 1976)
- Nationality: British

Terence Daniel Collier is a character in British sitcoms The Likely Lads, Whatever Happened to the Likely Lads?, and The Likely Lads film. He is played by Sunderland-born actor James Bolam.

In The Likely Lads Terry works with his friend, Bob Ferris, as an electrician at Ellison's Electricals, before joining the British Army. During his time in the army, he married a West German woman, Jutta Baumgarten, from whom he separates a few months later. Terry's army service is not shown, nor is his marriage (although his wife was due to appear in the episode "End of an Era", and remains on the credits despite the scene being cut). Whatever Happened to the Likely Lads begins with Terry's discharge from the army, and for the duration of the series he spends most of his time unemployed, although he takes brief temporary work as a car washer, hospital porter, forklift truck driver, and finally as a minicab driver. In The Likely Lads film he works briefly as a mobile soap powder salesman.

== Early life ==
Terry was conceived during an air raid on Newcastle upon Tyne, and born on 29 February 1944. From an early age he was seen as a disruptive threat to other children, and teachers would often warn other children not to talk to him for fear his disruptive influence would transfer to them. Terry says during the "No Hiding Place" episode of Whatever Happened to the Likely Lads? that his mother wanted him to be a doctor; but he showed little aptitude in school, generally cheating his way through exams. After leaving school at the age of fourteen, he went to night school, where, despite cheating at the exams, he still failed. He eventually qualified as an electrician and began working at Ellison's Electrical factory.

== Army service and marriage ==
In 1966, Bob decides to sign up for the British Army. Terry, not wanting to be away from Bob, also signs up. However, Bob is discharged due to flat feet, while Terry, initially to his horror, is accepted. He is stationed for most of his time in Cyprus, and also serves in Malta, West Germany and Devizes, Wiltshire. He also loses contact with Bob. In November 1969, Terry married a West German woman, Jutta Baumgarten. They separated in June 1970 after West Germany defeated England in the World Cup, before finally divorcing in 1976. Terry is discharged from the army in 1972.

== Personality ==
Despite being particularly proud of his working-class status, Terry is notably workshy, informing Bob in one episode that he has "dropped out of the rat race". Terry often uses his previous army service (in "the hot tropic night") to avoid working, because of his "dodgy spine", "Burmese malaria", and other mysterious ailments, including a never-explained leg injury. He is down-to-earth, quick-witted, po-faced and cynical. He aggressively dislikes being referred to as "thin" or "slim", preferring instead to describe himself as "wiry". Terry has a typical working-class male attitude towards women, seeing them primarily as sex objects. However, these views seem to mellow as the series goes on. He drinks and smokes heavily, tempting Bob to also indulge in the two vices he is always trying to cut down on.

Much of Whatever Happened to the Likely Lads? consists of reminiscent nostalgia, while the film is largely made of observations of the current status and lifestyles of the main protagonists, and perhaps fear of the future ("..the only thing to look forward to – the past"). Terry was in both cases primarily the main catalyst behind these features of the series. Terry is usually the character to make apt and sometimes ironic observations on life, and these observations are largely the basis for the humour and pathos of the latter parts of the series. Terry is scornful of any habits he sees as being "southern", pretentious or middle-class, as well as treating modern fads, conservatism and religion with the same sarcastic scorn.

Terry has a strained friendship with Bob's wife Thelma. Thelma views Terry as the biggest threat to her marriage, though the two are known to have had a brief courtship, which Thelma describes as "mistreatment by something coarse and vulgar". As the series goes on, Thelma's attitude towards Terry begins to soften, as she describes him as "honest" and "unpretentious" when a snobbish friend of hers insults him, and she turns to him for advice when she and Bob experience marital problems.

Terry is a fairly politicised character and often airs his views, which Bob refers to as "The Thoughts of Chairman Collier". A staunch "armchair socialist", Terry mentions that his grandfather and uncle were on the Jarrow March, with Bob interjecting that they "dropped out at Durham" when the pubs opened.

Terry holds extensive prejudices. In "No Hiding Place", Terry describes his impression of several nationalities: Orientals are "cruel", Egyptians are "cowardly", the Italians and French are "greasy", the Spanish are "lazy", Russians are "sinister", Americans are "flash", Germans are "arrogant", and the Danish are "pornographic". He then moves onto the British Isles: "I haven't much time for the Irish or the Welsh, and the Scots are worse than the Koreans". Bob then points out that Terry "never liked Southerners", to which Terry adds that he does not like many local people, in fact he "hates the people next door". Bob eventually narrows it all down to the fact that "from the barren wastes of Manchuria to 127 Inkerman Terrace", Terry "can't abide anyone". During "Count Down", when choosing suits for Bob's upcoming wedding, Terry initially refuses to let a shop assistant adjust his trousers (believing the assistant to be homosexual) until the assistant reveals he is married.

== Unclear duration of army service ==
The number of years Terry actually serves in the army is disputed.

In the first episode of Whatever Happened to the Likely Lads?, in 1973, Terry has been discharged from the Army and states that he served for five years. However, there was a gap of seven years between the last episode of The Likely Lads (1966, when Terry signed up for the Army) and its sequel (1973). Bob mentions that Terry originally signed up for three years, before signing on for a further two. In the first episode, when Terry asks Bob how things have changed while he was away, Bob mentions that they can now receive BBC2, with Terry replying that they were able to before he left. BBC2 did not begin broadcasting in the north-east until 1967, which implies that Terry had not joined the Army by then.

During the episode "Moving On", when discussing the various changes in Newcastle during Terry's time away, he asks if "there is one pre-1967 brick left standing on top of another" and in the episode "I'll Never Forget Whatshername", Terry, Bob and Thelma all refer to a trip to Blackpool Illuminations in September 1967, further implying that Terry had not yet joined the army at that point.

A potential explanation is that a version of the original series was broadcast on BBC Radio in 1967 and 1968, which may suggest Terry's military career actually lasted from 1968 (the end of the radio adaptations) to his discharge in 1973 (the beginning of the television sequel).
