= Sezen Djouma =

British actress

Sezen Djouma (born 2003) is an English actress, known for Grandpa in My Pocket, a children's television series that aired from 2009 till 2014 on CBeebies.

Djouma has also appeared in the ITV game show Keep It in the Family, and made brief appearances in soap operas like EastEnders.

Djouma has also done some live theatre work, including West End Live 2016 and performances in theatres including the Hackney Empire. She has been in a musical about young people, titled #OurStory.

She performed at Move It Dance Exhibition's Main Stage twice (2016, 2017). Djouma attended Spirit Young Performers Company.
