= Susan Jameson =

English actress (born 1941)

- Born: Susan I. M. Jameson; 13 August 1941 (age 85); Barnt Green, Worcestershire, England
- Occupation: Actress
- Years active: 1962–present
- Spouse: James Bolam (m. 1971)
- Children: 2

Susan I. M. Jameson (born 13 August 1941) is an English actress. She is best known for her roles as Jessie Seaton in When the Boat Comes In, Esther Lane in the BBC crime drama series New Tricks, and portraying Great Aunt Loretta in the CBeebies show Grandpa in My Pocket. She has also extensively performed in radio, notably voicing Mrs Wibbsey opposite the Fourth Doctor Tom Baker in a series of Doctor Who audio dramas. She also voiced audiobooks for all 52 novels by Catherine Cookson.

== Career ==
Jameson began acting at the age of the 10 when she enrolled at a speech and drama school in Birmingham; she broke into professional acting in the late 1950's, working for various repertory theatre companies based in Birmingham, Glasgow, Coventry and Cheltenham respectively. In 1962, she made her television debut appearing in an episode of Dixon of Dock Green. The following year she secured for her first major television role as Myra Booth (née Dickinson) in Coronation Street, featuring in 52 episodes between 1963 and 1964, she was offered a further two year contract to continue with part, but she subsequently declined. During this period, Jameson appeared in a number of television shows including The Likely Lads, No Hiding Place, Z-Cars, Strange Report, UFO, The Doctors, Softly Softly: Task Force and Space 1999.

In 1969, she appeared as Kate in the first series of Take Three Girls, which follows the lives of three young women who share a bedsit in West Kensington. In 1974, she featured in the final series of Special Branch, as Detective Sergeant Mary Holmes. Between 1976 to 1981, she played Jessie Seaton (later Jessie Ashton) in all four series of the period drama When the Boat Comes In, appearing alongside her husband James Bolam. In 1980, she appeared as prospective Labour candidate Christine Forster in the mini-series To Serve Them All My Days. She later reprised her role as Kate in Take Three Women in 1982 (the follow up to Take Three Girls) which reunited the original characters Victoria, Kate and Avril after going their separate ways in the intervening years. She also appeared in various sitcoms including The Upchat Line, Rings on Their Fingers, Hi-de-Hi!, Home to Roost, Hell's Bells, Never The Twain and All in Good Faith. In 1987, she played Aunt Em in the children's serial The Secret World of Molly Flint for TVS, two years later she appeared in an episode of Boon as Judy Shelley, a mentally ill mother who seeks refuge at Woodcote Park.

Jameson has continued to appear in supporting roles on television and film, appearing in Casualty, Woof!, Heartbeat, The Girl (1996), The Bill, Two Days, Nine Lives (2001), Dalziel and Pascoe, Holby City, Doctors, Grandpa in My Pocket, Him, Midsomer Murders and All Creatures Great and Small. Between 2003 and 2013, she appeared in New Tricks as Esther Lane, the long-suffering wife of ex-Detective Inspector Brian Lane (played by Alun Armstrong), she featured in ten series before she departed along with Armstrong in 2013. In 2009, she was one of five actresses portraying Queen Elizabeth II in the docu-drama series The Queen, which charted pivotal years in the monarch's life.

== Personal life ==
She is married to fellow actor James Bolam, with whom she has appeared in numerous episodes of various television series, including The Likely Lads, When The Boat Comes In, New Tricks and Grandpa in My Pocket, as well appearing on stage on a number of occasions including Macbeth and A Fool and His Money They have lived in Wisborough Green, West Sussex for more than 30 years.

Jameson has also worked as a writer, including three episodes of The Hoobs, and the semi-autobiographical Pony Tails, a collection of four short stories based on the ponies she and her family have owned over the years. Jameson is a patron of the Chichester Festival Youth Theatre and president of the ABC Animal Sanctuary in West Chiltington and the Cat and Rabbit Rescue Centre in Sidlesham. She has also been involved in a number of animal charities, including the Hawk and Owl Trust, Compassion in World Farming and Merrylegs Assisted Riding, where she latterly helped young disabled horse riders at Brinsbury College in Pulborough.

== Selected filmography ==
=== TV and film ===
Year	Title	Role	Notes
1962	Dixon of Dock Green	Jessie Kennedy	Episode: "Cash and Carry"
1963–1968	Coronation Street	Myra Booth (née Dickinson)	60 episodes
1964	Crossroads	Patricia Walker	3 episodes
1964	The Likely Lads	Pat	Episode: "Double Date"
1965	No Hiding Place	Dana Clark	Episode: "A Menace to the Public"
1965–1975	Z-Cars	WPC Nelson	6 episodes
1968	Last of the Long-haired Boys	Bimba	Film
1969	Strange Report	Moira	Episode: "REPORT 8319 GRENADE - What price change?"
1969–1970	Take Three Girls	Kate	12 episodes
1970	Armchair Theatre	Jean	Episode: "Say Goodnight to Your Grandma"
1970	The Doctors	Pamela Renshaw	8 episodes
1970	The Wednesday Play	Jenny	Episode: "Rest in Peace, Uncle Fred"
1971	I, Monster	Diane	Film
1971	UFO	Anne Stone	Episode: "The Sound of Silence"
1973	Softly, Softly: Task Force	WDC Joan Bray	Episode: "The Loud Mouth"
1974	Special Branch	DS Mary Holmes	4 episodes
1975	Space: 1999	Professor Juliet Mackie	Episode: "Dragon's Domain"
1976–1981	When the Boat Comes In	Jessie Ashton (née Seaton)	30 episodes
1978	International Velvet	TV Interviewer	Film
1978	The Upchat Connection	Maggie	8 episodes
1978	Wodehouse Playhouse	Bella Mae Jobson	Episode: "The Editor Regrets"
1980	Rings on Their Fingers	Jennifer	2 episodes
1980–1981	To Serve Them All My Days	Christine Forster	5 episodes
1982	Take Three Women	Kate	3 episodes
1983	Hi-de-Hi!	Jenny Maitland	Episode: "The Marriage Settlement"
1985	Terry on the Fence	Terry's mum	Film
1986	Hell's Bells	Emma Hethercote	6 episodes
1986	Home to Roost	Judith Trevelyan	Episode: "Any Questions?"
1986–2023	Casualty	Harriet / Samantha Grieve / Sheila Falon / Audrey Rinsler / Freya Hall	7 episodes
1987	Never the Twain	Dr. Collins	Episode: "Feed a Cold"
1987	The Secret World of Molly Flint	Aunt Em	5 episodes
1988	All in Good Faith	Emma Lambe	6 episodes
1989	Boon	Judith Shelley	Episode: "Sickness and Health"
1991	Woof!	Mrs. Varley	1 episode
1993–2009	Heartbeat	Jennifer Bradshaw / Edwina Lambert / Sonia Rumbold	4 episodes
1996	The Girl	Daisy Loam	TV movie
1997	The Bill	Beverley Harper	Episode: "An Englishman's Home"
2001	Two Days, Nine Lives	Polly	Film
2002	Dalziel and Pascoe	Annie Pascoe	Episode: "The Unwanted"
2003–2013	New Tricks	Esther Lane	54 episodes
2004	Holby City	Sylvia Clifford	Episode: "Striking a Chord"
2004–2012	Doctors	Lily Preston / Grace Masson / Mrs. Alice Devene	3 episodes
2009	The Queen	Queen Elizabeth II	Episode: "The Rivals"
2009–2014	Grandpa in My Pocket	Great Aunt Loretta	36 episodes
2012	Holby City	Abigail Dutton	Episode: "Hold on Me"
2016	Him	Rose	3 episodes
2017	Midsomer Murders	Germaine Troughton	Episode: "Last Man Out"
2020	All Creatures Great and Small	Lillian Calvert	Episode: "Andante"

=== Radio ===
Date	Title	Role	Director	Station
23 August 2004	The Coast of Maine: Miss Tempy's Watchers	Sarah Ann Binson	Ned Chaillet	BBC Radio 4, Woman's Hour Drama
3 March 2005	The Tragical Comedy or Comical Tragedy of Mr. Punch	Grandmother	Lu Kemp	BBC Radio 3, The Wire
16 March 2005 – 6 April 2005	The Great Pursuit	Cynthia Bogden	Toby Swift	BBC Radio 4
5 May 2005	Stone Baby	Nurse	Toby Swift	BBC Radio 3, The Wire
6 May 2005	Claw Marks on the Curtain: The Open Window	Caroline Nuttel	Ned Chaillet	BBC Radio 4, Woman's Hour Drama
5 December 2005 – 30 December 2005	David Copperfield	Peggotty / Mrs Gummidge	Jeremy Mortimer	BBC Radio 4, Woman's Hour Drama
