= Drama 61-67 =

1961 British TV anthology drama series

- Starring: Brain Haines; Robert Cartland; Alister Williamson; Joe Ritchie; Carl Bernard; John Barrett; Michael Aldridge; Avis Bunnage; Peter Sallis; James Bolam; Derek Benfield
- Country of origin: United Kingdom

Production
- Running time: 50 minutes

Original release
- Network: ATV
- Release: 19 March 1961 – 1967

Drama 61-67 is a British anthology drama series which took a different title, based on year of transmission, each year. It alternated with Armchair Theatre from ABC in the Sunday evening slot.

The series was described at the time as epitomising ATV drama.

It is unknown how many episodes exist or are missing, although Nigel Kneale's Drama 64 episode The Crunch is known to exist and is available on DVD. This episode marked the screen debut of a then twelve-year-old Olivia Hussey.
