= Love Story (British TV series) =

British TV anthology series (1963–1974)

- Country of origin: United Kingdom
- No. of episodes: 128

Production
- Production company: Associated Television

Original release
- Network: ITV
- Release: 1963 – 1974

Love Story is a 60-minute British anthology television series produced by Associated Television (ATV). A total of 128 episodes aired on ITV from 1963 to 1974.

Its guest stars included Vanessa Redgrave, Lynn Redgrave, Stephanie Beacham, James Bolam, Dudley Moore, Wendy Hiller, Malcolm McDowell, Patrick Macnee, John Hurt, Geoffrey Palmer, Judy Cornwell, Leo McKern, David Hemmings, Judy Parfitt, Anna Massey, Penelope Keith, Felicity Kendal, Edward Fox, Sam Wanamaker, Ian McShane, Michael Kitchen, George Maharis and Margaret Whiting.
