= Alcalá (surname) =

Alcalá (with an acute accent) or Alcala (lacking the acute accent) is a Spanish surname.

Alcalá (Spanish) and Alcalà (Catalan) are all ultimately derived (typically through placenames) from the Arabic word al-qalʿah (القلعة), meaning "the citadel" or "fortification". The variant Arcala is found in Ilocano language areas of the Philippine Islands, and some other places.

Notable people with the surname include:

Listed alphabetically in each section by given name

== Music ==
- Macedonio Alcalá (1831–1869), Mexican violinist, pianist and songwriter
- Nilo Alcala (born 1978), Philippine composer and chorister

== Politics ==
- Blanca Alcalá (born 1961), Mexican politician
- Dora Alcala, American politician
- Niceto Alcalá-Zamora, Spanish lawyer and politician who served a president of Spain (1931–1936)

== Science ==
- Angel Alcala (1929–2023), Filipino biologist
- Luis Alcalá, Spanish paleontologist

== Sports ==
=== Baseball ===
- Jorge Alcalá (born 1995), Dominican baseball player
- Santo Alcalá (born 1952), Dominican baseball player

=== Football (soccer) ===
- Alex Alcalá (born 2005), American-born footballer for Mexico
- Gil Alcalá (born 1992), Mexican footballer
- Josh Alcala (born 1984), American footballer
- Pedro Alcalá (born 1989), Spanish footballer

=== Running ===
- Gerardo Alcalá (born 1961), Mexican long-distance runner
- Marc Alcalá (born 1994), Spanish middle-distance runner

=== Other sports ===
- María José Alcalá (born 1971), Mexican diver
- Raúl Alcalá (born 1964), Mexican road racing cyclist
- Rubén Alcala (born 1953), Mexican basketball player

== Writing and illustrating ==
- Alfredo Alcala (1925–2000), Filipino comic book artist
- Guido Rodríguez Alcalá (born 1946), Paraguayan poet and literary critic
- Kathleen Alcalá (born 1954), American author
- Larry Alcala (1926–2002), Philippine cartoonist and illustrator
- Luis Espinosa Alcalá (1932–2009), Mexican poet, songwriter, and music promoter

== Other ==
- Alfonso de Alcalá (fl. 1520s), Spanish physician
- Félix Enríquez Alcalá (born 1951), American television and movie director, cinematographer and producer
- Guillermo Ríos Alcalá, Mexican potter
- Marcel Alcalá (born 1990) American artist
- María Luisa Alcalá (1943–2016), Mexican actress and director
- Rodney Alcala (1943–2021), American rapist and serial killer

== See also ==
- Alcalá (disambiguation)
- Alcalá-Galiano
- Alcalá-Zamora
- Alkalai (the Hebrew version of the name, found among Sephardic Jews)
