= Alcalá =

Alcalá, Alcalà or Alcala may refer to:

== People ==
- Alcalá (surname), includes a list of people with that name

== Places ==
=== Bolivia ===
- Alcalá, Tomina, a town in Bolivia

=== Colombia ===
- Alcalá, Valle del Cauca, Colombia

=== Philippines ===
- Alcala, Cagayan, a municipality in the Philippines
- Alcala, Pangasinan, a municipality in the Philippines

=== Spain ===
- Alcalá de Ebro, a town in Zaragoza, Spain
- Alcalá de Guadaíra, a town in Seville, Spain
- Alcalá de Gurrea, a town in Huesca, Spain
- Alcalá de Henares, a city close to Madrid
  - Comarca de Alcalá, a comarca (district) in Madrid, Spain
- Alcalá del Júcar, a town in Albacete, Spain
- Alcalá de la Vega, a town in Cuenca, Spain
- Alcalá de los Gazules, a town in Cádiz, Spain
- Alcalá de Moncayo, a town in Zaragoza, Spain
- Alcalá del Río, a town in Seville, Spain
- Alcalá del Valle, a town in Cádiz, Spain
- Alcalà de Xivert, a town in Castellón, Spain
- Alcalá la Real, a town in Jaén, Spain
- Alcalá de la Selva, a town in Teruel, Spain
- La Vall d'Alcalà (Spanish: Vall de Alcalá), a valley in the Marina Alta region of Alicante, Spain

== Sport ==
- CD Alcalá, a football team based in Alcalá de Guadaira, Spain
- RSD Alcalá, a football team based in Alcalá de Henares, Spain

== Other uses ==
- University of Alcalá, Alcalá de Henares, Spain
- Puerta de Alcalá, a monument in Madrid
- Calle de Alcalá, one of the main streets of Madrid
  - Alcalá 20 nightclub fire, 1983
- Alcalá (TransMilenio), a station of the TransMilenio system in Bogotá, Colombia

== See also ==
- Alcazaba (disambiguation)
- Alcazar (disambiguation)
- Alcántara (disambiguation)
- Alcalus, a genus of frogs
- Al Qala, location of the Bahrain Fort
- Mission San Diego de Alcalá, the first Spanish mission on the American Pacific Coast
