= Alcazar =

Alcazar or variant spellings may refer to:

- Alcázar, a type of Islamic castle or palace in Spain and Portugal

== Theatres ==
- Alcazar Theatre (disambiguation)
- Teatro Alcázar, a theatre in Madrid, Spain
- Alcazar (Paris) (later Alcazar d'Hiver), a café-concert in Paris 1858–1902
- Alcazar d'Été, a café-concert in Paris 1860–1914
- Alcazar (Marseille), a library and former theatre in Marseille, France
- Alcazar Stadium, a multi-purpose stadium in Larissa, Greece

== Arts, entertainment and literature ==
- Alcazar (group), a Swedish europop/dance music group
- General Alcazar, a fictional character, friend of Tintin
- Roberto Alcázar y Pedrín, a Spanish comic from 1940
- Alcazar: The Forgotten Fortress, a 1985 video game

== Businesses and organisations ==
- Alcazar Hotel (disambiguation), the name of several hotels
- Alcazar (airline), a 1993 proposed airline merger
- El Alcázar, a Spanish newspaper 1936–1988
- Alcázar Basket, a former Spanish basketball team

== Palaces ==
- Alcázar de Colón, a fortified Spanish palace located in Santo Domingo, Dominican Republic
- Alcázar de los Reyes Cristianos, a medieval castle located in the historic centre of Córdoba, Spain
- Alcázar Genil, a medieval palace located in the historic centre of Granada, Spain
- Alcázar of Jerez de la Frontera, medieval castle in Jerez de la Frontera, Andalusia, Spain
- Alcázar of Segovia, medieval castle located in the city of Segovia, Castile and León, Spain
- Alcázar of Seville, a royal palace in Seville, Spain
- Alcázar of the Caliphs (Córdoba), remains of a former fortified medieval palace located in Córdoba, Spain
- Alcázar of Toledo, a fortified medieval palace located in Toledo, Spain

- Siege of the Alcázar, 1936 Spanish Civil War event in Toledo

- Gate of Sevilla (Carmona), also known as the Alcázar de la Puerta de Sevilla, remains of a former fortified medieval palace located in Carmona, Spain
- Royal Alcázar of Madrid, a former fortress located at the site of today's Royal Palace of Madrid, Madrid, Spain

== Municipalities ==
- Alcàsser (Spanish: Alcácer), a municipality in Horta Sud, Valencian Community, Spain
- Alcázar de San Juan, or Alcázar, a town and municipality in Ciudad Real, Castile-La Mancha, Spain
- Alcázar del Rey, a municipality in Cuenca, Castile-La Mancha, Spain
- Alcácer do Sal, a municipality in Setúbal District, Portugal
- El Alcázar, Misiones, a village in Argentina
- Los Alcázares, a municipality and a coastal spa town and former fishing village on the western side of the Mar Menor in Murcia, southeastern Spain
- Alcocer (derives from a diminutive of alcázar), a municipality in Castile-La Mancha, Spain
- Alcocer de Planes, a municipality in Valencia, Spain
- Alcossebre, a town in Alcalà de Xivert, Valencia, Spain
- Ksar el-Kebir (Spanish: Alcazarquivir, Portuguese: Alcácer-Quibir), a city in northwest Morocco

== People ==
- Henry Alcazar (1860–1930), Trinidadian politician who served as the mayor of Port of Spain
- Vicente Alcazar (born 1944), Spanish comics artist
- Alcázar (surname), Portuguese and Spanish surname

== Other uses ==
- Hyundai Alcazar, a compact crossover SUV

== See also ==
- Alcazaba (disambiguation)
- Alcalá (disambiguation)
- Alcántara (disambiguation)
- Qasr (disambiguation)
