= Alcazar Theatre =

Alcazar Theatre may refer to:

- Alcazar Theatre (1885), O'Farrell Street in San Francisco; destroyed in the earthquake and fire of 1906
- Alcazar Theatre (1911), O'Farrell Street in San Francisco; demolished in 1961
- Alcazar Theatre (1976), Geary Street in San Francisco built in 1917
- Alcazar Theatre (Birmingham, Alabama), movie theatre later renamed the Capitol Theater
- Alcazar Theatre (Vancouver, British Columbia) performance space, later renamed the York
- Alcazar Theatre (Pattaya, Thailand)
- Alcazar Theatre (London, England), opened in 1913, bombed in World War Two
- Playhouse Theatre (Portland, Oregon), formerly known as Alcazar Theatre
