= Metanalysis =

Metanalysis may refer to:

- Meta-analysis, when studies and statistics are combined
- Metanalysis (linguistics), when words are broken down in different ways
