= Gasr =

A gasr (plural gsur) is a fortified building found predominantly in Libya.

There is much conjecture about their relation to the centenaria built by invading Roman forces.

== See also ==
- Qasr, Arabic word for castle, fortified palace
- Ksar, North-African fortified village; from qasr
