= Voiced dental and alveolar lateral approximants =

Consonantal sounds represented by ⟨l⟩ in IPA

Voiced alveolar lateral approximant

l
- IPA number: 155

Audio sample
- source · help

Encoding
- Entity (decimal): &#108;
- Unicode (hex): U+006C
- X-SAMPA: l
- Braille: ⠇ (braille pattern dots-123)
Image

Voiced dental lateral approximant

l̪

Audio sample
- source · help
Image

Voiced postalveolar lateral approximant

l̠

Audio sample
- source · help

Voiced dental and alveolar lateral approximants are a type of consonantal sound used in many spoken languages. It is familiar to English-speakers as the "l" sound in "lift". The symbol in the International Phonetic Alphabet that represents them is ⟨l⟩.

As a sonorant, lateral approximants are nearly always voiced. Voiceless lateral approximants, /l̥/ are common in Sino-Tibetan languages, but uncommon elsewhere. In such cases, voicing typically starts about halfway through the hold of the consonant. No language is known to contrast such a sound with a voiceless alveolar lateral fricative [ɬ].

In a number of languages, including most varieties of English, the phoneme /l/ becomes velarized ("dark l") in certain contexts. By contrast, the non-velarized form is the "clear l" (also called "light l"), which occurs before and between vowels in certain English standards. Some languages have only clear l. Others may not have a clear l at all, or have it only before front vowels (especially [i]).

== Features ==
Features of voiced alveolar lateral approximants:

- Its manner of articulation is approximant, which means it is produced by narrowing the vocal tract at the place of articulation, but not enough to produce a turbulent airstream.
- There are four specific place of articulation variants of [l]:
  - Dental, which means it is articulated with either the tip or the blade of the tongue at the upper teeth, termed respectively apical and laminal.
  - Denti-alveolar, which means it is articulated with the blade of the tongue at the alveolar ridge, and the tip of the tongue behind upper teeth.
  - Alveolar, which means it is articulated with either the tip or the blade of the tongue at the alveolar ridge, termed respectively apical and laminal.
  - Postalveolar, which means it is articulated with either the tip or the blade of the tongue behind the alveolar ridge, termed respectively apical and laminal.
- Its phonation is voiced, which means the vocal cords vibrate during the articulation.
- It is an oral consonant, which means that air is not allowed to escape through the nose.
- It is a lateral consonant, which means it is produced by directing the airstream over the sides of the tongue, rather than down the middle.
- Its airstream mechanism is pulmonic, which means it is articulated by pushing air only with the intercostal muscles and abdominal muscles, as in most speech sounds.

== Occurrence ==
Languages may have clear apical or laminal alveolars, laminal denti-alveolars (such as French), or true dentals, which are uncommon. Laminal denti-alveolars tend to occur in continental European languages. However, a true dental generally occurs allophonically before /θ/ in languages that have it, as in English health.

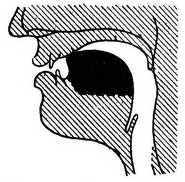
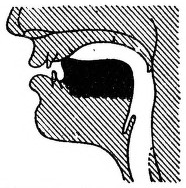
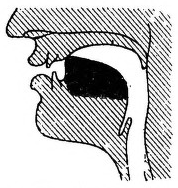
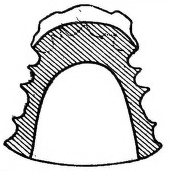
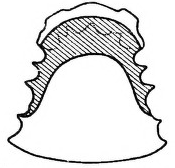
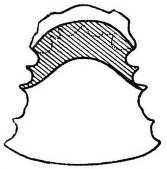
Sagittal sections and palatograms of the vowel-colored coronal laterals [lⁱ], [lᵘ], and [lᵊ].

Coronal laterals are often colored by surrounding vowels in their articulation, as the main portion of the tongue body remains free. If necessary, this coloring can be transcribed with superscript vowels, such as ⟨lⁱ lᵘ lᵊ⟩. (Note: Technically speaking, a [u]-colored [lᵘ] is equivalent to a velarized [ɫ] ("dark l"), while a [i]-colored [lⁱ] is equivalent to a plain [l] ("clear l"). However, the typical clear–dark distinction implies only two forms of an alveolar /l/, when in fact any vowel may color its articulation, as shown by Jones (1922, p. 45) with palatograms of the additional examples [lᵉ], [lᵓ], [lᵅ], [lᵊ]; and by Szalay et al. (2024) with MRI and formant analysis confirming a three-way [lⁱ]–[lᵅ]–[lᵘ] distinction.)

=== Dental or denti-alveolar ===
Language		Word	IPA	Meaning	Notes
Arabic	Gulf	لـين/leen	[l̪eːn]	'when'	Laminal denti-alveolar. See Arabic phonology
Chinese	Cantonese	蘭/laan4	[l̪an˨˩]	'orchid'	
Chinese	Mandarin	蘭/lán	[l̪an˨˥]	'orchid'	
Hungarian		elem	[ˈɛl̪ɛm]	'battery'	Laminal denti-alveolar. See Hungarian phonology
Italian		molto	[ˈmol̪ːt̪o]	'much, a lot'	Laminal denti-alveolar. Allophone of /l/ before /t, d, s, z, t͡s, d͡z/. See Italian phonology
Macedonian		лево/levo	[l̪e̞vo̞]	'left'	Laminal denti-alveolar. See Macedonian phonology
Mapudungun		ḻafkeṉ	[l̪ɐ̝fkën̪]	'sea, lake'	Interdental.
Norwegian	Urban East	anlegg	[²ɑnːl̪ɛg]	'plant (industrial)'	Allophone of /l/ after /n, t, d/. See Norwegian phonology
Spanish		altar	[äl̪ˈt̪äɾ]	'altar'	Laminal denti-alveolar. Allophone of /l/ before /t/, /d/. See Spanish phonology
Swedish	Central Standard	allt	[äl̪t̪]	'everything'	Laminal denti-alveolar. See Swedish phonology
Uzbek		kelajak	[kel̪ædʒæk]	'future'	Laminal denti-alveolar. Velarized between a non-front rounded vowel and a consonant or juncture phoneme.
Vietnamese	Hanoi	lửa	[l̪ɨə˧˩˧]	'fire'	See Vietnamese phonology

=== Alveolar ===
Language		Word	IPA	Meaning	Notes
Arabic	Standard	لا/lā	[laʔ]	'no'	See Arabic phonology
Armenian	Eastern	լուսին/lusin	[lusin]	'moon'	
Assyrian		ܠܚܡܐ/läḳma	[lεxma]	'bread'	
Bengali		লম্বা	[lɔmbɐ]	'long'	See Bengali phonology
Breton		lagad	['lagat]	'eye'	
Catalan	Some dialects	tela	[ˈt̪ɛl̺ə]	'fabric'	Apical front alveolar. More frequently velarized (dark l). See Catalan phonology
Chuvash		хула	[хu'la]	'city'	
Czech		bílý	[ˈbiːliː]	'white'	See Czech phonology
Dutch	Standard	laten	[ˈl̻aːt̻ə]	'to let'	Laminal. Some Standard Belgian speakers use the clear /l/ in all positions. See Dutch phonology
Dutch	Some Eastern accents	mal	[mɑl̻]	'mold'	Laminal; realization of /l/ in all positions. See Dutch phonology
Dhivehi		ލަވަ/lava	[laʋa]	'song'	
English	Most accents	let	[lɛt]	'to let'	Varies between apical and laminal, with the latter being predominant.
English	Irish, Geordie	tell	[tʰɛl]	'to tell'	
Esperanto		luno	[ˈluno]	'moon'	See Esperanto phonology
Filipino		luto	[ˈluto]	'to cook'	See Filipino phonology
Georgian		ლექსი/leksi	[le̞kʰs̪i]	'verse/poetry'	See Georgian phonology
Georgian		რბილი/rbili	[ɾbili]	'soft'	See Georgian phonology
Greek		λέξη/léksi	[ˈleksi]	'word'	See Modern Greek phonology
Hebrew		לילה/laila	['lajla]	'night'	See Modern Hebrew phonology.
Italian		letto	[ˈlɛt̪ːo]	'bed'	Apical. See Italian phonology
Japanese		六/roku	[lo̞kɯ̟ᵝ]	'six'	Apical. More commonly [ɾ]. See Japanese phonology
Kashubian					
Khmer		ភ្លេង/phléng	[pʰleːŋ]	'music'	See Khmer phonology
Korean		일/il	[il]	'one' or 'work'	Realized as alveolar tap ɾ in the beginning of a syllable. See Korean phonology.
Kyrgyz		көпөлөк/köpölök	[køpøˈløk]	'butterfly'	Velarized in back vowel contexts. See Kyrgyz phonology
Laghu		laghu	[lagu]	'Laghu language'	
Laghuu	Nậm Sài, Sa Pa Town		[la˧˨ ɣɯ˥]	'Laghuu language'	
Malayalam		തല	[t̪ɐlɐ]	'head'	See Malayalam phonology
Mapudungun		elun	[ëˈlʊn]	'to give'	
Nepali		लामो	[lämo]	'long'	See Nepali phonology
Odia		ଭଲ	[bʰɔlɔ]	'good'	
Persian		لاما/lāmā	[lɒmɒ]	'llama'	See Persian phonology
Polish		pole	[ˈpɔlɛ]	'field'	Contrasts with [ɫ̪] (/w/) for a small number of speakers. When it does, it might be palatalized to [lʲ]. See Polish phonology
Romanian		alună	[äˈlun̪ə]	'hazelnut'	Apical. See Romanian phonology
Scottish Gaelic		maoil	[mɯːl]	'headland'	Apical. Contrasts with /ɫ̪/ and /ʎ/. See Scottish Gaelic phonology
Slovak		mĺkvy	[ˈml̩ːkʋi]	'silent'	Syllabic form can be long or short. See Slovak phonology
Slovene		letalo	[lɛˈt̪àːlɔ]	'airplane'	See Slovene phonology
Spanish		hablar	[äˈβ̞läɾ]	'to speak'	See Spanish phonology
Tamil		புலி/puli	[pul̪i]	'tiger'	See Tamil phonology
Welsh		diafol	[djavɔl]	'devil'	See Welsh phonology
Ukrainian		обличчя/oblychchya	[oˈblɪt͡ʃːɐ]	'face'	Contrasts with palatalized form. See Ukrainian phonology

=== Postalveolar ===
Language		Word	IPA	Meaning	Notes
Catalan		Elx	[ˈɛl̠(t͡)ɕ]	'Elche'	Allophone of /l/ before /ʃ, ʒ, t͡ʃ, d͡ʒ/ ([ɕ, ʑ, t͡ɕ, d͡ʑ]), may be alveolo-palatal instead. See Catalan phonology
Igbo	Standard	lì	[l̠ì]	'bury'	
Italian		il cervo	[il̠ʲ ˈt͡ʃɛrvo]	'the deer'	Palatalized laminal; allophone of /l/ before /ʃ, t͡ʃ, d͡ʒ/. See Italian phonology
Turkish		lale	[ʎ̟äːˈʎ̟ɛ]	'tulip'	Palatalized; contrasts with a velarized dental lateral [ɫ̟]. May be devoiced elsewhere. See Turkish phonology
Zapotec	Tilquiapan	lan	[l̠an]	'soot'	

=== Variable ===
Language		Word	IPA	Meaning	Notes
Faroese		linur	[ˈliːnʊɹ]	'soft'	Varies between dental and alveolar in initial position, whereas the postvocalic /l/ may be postalveolar, especially after back vowels. See Faroese phonology
French		il	[il]	'he'	Varies between laminal denti-alveolar and apical alveolar, with the latter being predominant. See French phonology
German	Standard	Liebe	[ˈliːbə]	'love'	Varies between denti-alveolar, laminal alveolar and apical alveolar.
Norwegian	Urban East	liv	[liːʋ]	'life'	In process of changing from laminal denti-alveolar to apical alveolar, but the laminal denti-alveolar is still possible in some environments, and is obligatory after /n, t, d/. See Norwegian phonology
Portuguese	Most Brazilian dialects, some EP speakers	lero-lero	[ˈlɛɾʊ ˈlɛɾʊ]	'runaround'	Clear, dental to sometimes alveolar. Only occurs in syllable onset, with l-vocalization widely occurring in coda. Sometimes found before front vowels only in the European variety. See Portuguese phonology.
Portuguese	Most Brazilian dialects, some EP speakers	Lituânia	[l̪it̪uˈɐ̃ɲ̟ɐ]	'Lithuania'	Clear, dental to sometimes alveolar. Only occurs in syllable onset, with l-vocalization widely occurring in coda. Sometimes found before front vowels only in the European variety. See Portuguese phonology.

=== Nasal ===
Nasalized voiced alveolar lateral approximant

l̃

Encoding
- X-SAMPA: l~

A nasalized voiced alveolar lateral approximant is a type of consonantal sound used in some spoken languages. The symbol in the International Phonetic Alphabet that represents this sound is ⟨l̃⟩.

Language		Word	IPA	Meaning	Notes
Gbe	All lects		[ml̃ɔ̃˥ ]	'to lie down'	Occurs syllable-initially or as second element of syllable-initial cluster; nasalized [l̃] is always followed by a nasal vowel. See Gbe phonology
Guarani		leõ	[l̃ẽˈõ]	'lion'	Nasalized allophone of /l/ as a result of nasal harmony. See Guarani language § Nasal harmony
Nzema		nlɛka	[l̃ɛka]	'boxes'	Contrasts with /l/.
Wamey					

== Velarized or pharyngealized alveolar lateral approximant ==
Voiced velarized or pharyngealized alveolar lateral approximant

ɫ

lˠ

lˁ
- IPA number: 209

Audio sample
- source · help

Encoding
- Entity (decimal): &#108;&#736;
- Unicode (hex): U+006C U+02E0
- X-SAMPA: 5 or l_G or l_?\
Image

A voiced velarized or pharyngealized alveolar lateral approximant (also known as dark l) is a type of consonantal sound used in some languages. It is an alveolar, denti-alveolar, or dental lateral approximant, with a secondary articulation of velarization or pharyngealization. The regular symbols in the International Phonetic Alphabet that represent this sound are ⟨lˠ⟩ (for a velarized lateral) and ⟨lˤ⟩ (for a pharyngealized lateral), though the dedicated letter ⟨ɫ⟩, which covers both velarization and pharyngealization, is perhaps more common. The latter should not be confused with belted ⟨ɬ⟩, which represents the voiceless alveolar lateral fricative. However, some scholars use that symbol to represent the velarized alveolar lateral approximant anyway – though such usage is considered non-standard.

If the sound is dental or denti-alveolar, one could use a dental diacritic to indicate so: ⟨l̪ˠ⟩, ⟨l̪ˤ⟩, ⟨ɫ̪⟩.

Velarization and pharyngealization are generally associated with more dental articulations of coronal consonants, so dark l tends to be dental or denti-alveolar. Clear (non-velarized) l tends to be retracted to an alveolar position.

The term dark l is often synonymous with hard l, especially in Slavic languages. (cf. hard consonants)

=== Features ===
Features of a dark L:

- Its manner of articulation is approximant, which means it is produced by narrowing the vocal tract at the place of articulation, but not enough to produce a turbulent airstream.
- There are four specific place of articulation variants of [ɫ]:
  - Dental, which means it is articulated with either the tip or the blade of the tongue at the upper teeth.
  - Denti-alveolar, which means it is articulated with the blade of the tongue at the alveolar ridge, and the tip of the tongue behind upper teeth.
  - Alveolar, which means it is articulated with either the tip or, more rarely, the blade of the tongue at the alveolar ridge, termed respectively apical and laminal.
  - Postalveolar, which means it is articulated with either the tip or the blade of the tongue behind the alveolar ridge, termed respectively apical and laminal.
- It has a secondary articulation of velarization or pharyngealization, meaning that the back or root of the tongue approaches the soft palate (velum), or the back of the throat, respectively.
- Its phonation is voiced, which means the vocal cords vibrate during the articulation.
- It is an oral consonant, which means that air is not allowed to escape through the nose.
- It is a lateral consonant, which means it is produced by directing the airstream over the sides of the tongue, rather than down the middle.
- Its airstream mechanism is pulmonic, which means it is articulated by pushing air only with the intercostal muscles and abdominal muscles, as in most speech sounds.

=== Occurrence ===
==== Dental or denti-alveolar ====
Voiced velarized or pharyngealized dental lateral approximant

ɫ̪

l̪ˠ

l̪ˁ

Language		Word	IPA	Meaning	Notes
Bashkir		ҡала/قاڵـا /qala	[qɑ'ɫ̪ɑ]	'city'	Velarized dental lateral; occurs in back vowel contexts.
Belarusian		Беларусь/Biełaruś	[bʲɛɫ̪äˈrusʲ]	'Belarus'	Laminal denti-alveolar; contrasts with palatalized form. See Belarusian phonology
Bulgarian		стол/stol	[stoɫ̪]	'chair'	Laminal denti-alveolar. See Bulgarian phonology
Catalan		alt	[ˈɑɫ̪(t̪)]	'tall'	Laminal denti-alveolar. Allophone of /l/ before /t, d/. See Catalan phonology
Classical Armenian		խաղեր/xałer	[χɑɫɛɹ]	'games'	/ʁ/ ġ in modern Armenian.
Icelandic		sigldi	[s̺ɪɫ̪t̪ɪ]	'sailed'	Laminal denti-alveolar; rare. See Icelandic phonology
Kashubian	Older southeastern speakers	kôłbasa			Laminal denti-alveolar; realized as [w] by other speakers.
Lithuanian		labas	[ˈɫ̪äːbɐs̪]	'hi'	Laminal denti-alveolar; contrasts with palatalized form. See Lithuanian phonology
Macedonian		лук/luk	[ɫ̪uk]	'garlic'	Laminal denti-alveolar. Present only before back vowels (/u, o, a/) and syllable-finally. See Macedonian phonology
Norwegian	Urban East	tale	[ˈt̻ʰɑːɫ̪ə]	'speech'	Laminal denti-alveolar. Allophone of /l/ after /ɔ, oː, ɑ, ɑː/, and sometimes also after /u, uː/. However, according to Endresen (1990), this allophone is not velarized. See Norwegian phonology
Polish	Eastern dialects	łapa	[ˈɫ̪äpä]	'paw'	Laminal denti-alveolar. Corresponds to [w] in other varieties. See Polish phonology
Russian		малый/malyj	[ˈmɑ̟ɫ̪ɨ̞j]	'small'	Pharyngealized laminal denti-alveolar. See Russian phonology
Scottish Gaelic		Mallaig	[ˈmäʊɫ̪ækʲ]	'Mallaig'	Apical dental, occasionally laminal. In certain dialects manifests as [w] or [l̪ˠw]. Contrasts with /l/ and /ʎ/. See Scottish Gaelic phonology
Swedish	Northern Västerbotten	kall	[ˈkɒɫː]	'cold'	Allophone of /lː/
Turkish		lala	[ɫ̟ɑˈɫ̟ɑ]	'servant'	Laminal denti-alveolar; contrasts with a palatalized postalveolar lateral [ʎ̟]. May be devoiced elsewhere. See Turkish phonology

==== Alveolar ====
Language		Word	IPA	Meaning	Notes
Afrikaans	Standard	tafel	[ˈtɑːfəɫ]	'table'	Velarized in all positions, especially non-prevocalically. See Afrikaans phonology
Albanian	Standard	llullë	[ˈɫuɫə]	'smoking pipe'	
Arabic	Standard	الله/ʼAllah	[ʔaɫˈɫaːh]	'God'	Also transcribed as ⟨lˤ⟩. Many accents and dialects lack the sound and instead pronounce [l]. See Arabic phonology
Catalan	Most dialects	mal	[ˈmɑɫ̺]	'bad, evil'	Apical. Can be always dark in many dialects. See Catalan phonology
Dutch	Standard	mallen	[ˈmɑɫ̻ə]	'molds'	Laminal; pharyngealized in northern accents, velarized or post-palatalised in southern accents. It is an allophone of /l/ before consonants and pauses, and also prevocalically when after the open back vowels /ɔ, ɑ/. Many northern speakers realize the final /l/ as a strongly pharyngealised vocoid [ɤˤ], whereas some Standard Belgian speakers use the clear /l/ in all positions. See Dutch phonology
Dutch	Some Netherlandic accents	laten	[ˈɫ̻aːt̻ə]	'to let'	Pharyngealized laminal; realization of /l/ in all positions. See Dutch phonology
English	Australian	feel	[fiːɫ]	'feel'	Most often apical; can be always dark in Australia and New Zealand. See Australian English phonology, New Zealand English phonology, and English phonology
English	Canadian	feel	[fiːɫ]	'feel'	Most often apical; can be always dark in Australia and New Zealand. See Australian English phonology, New Zealand English phonology, and English phonology
English	Dublin	feel	[fiːɫ]	'feel'	Most often apical; can be always dark in Australia and New Zealand. See Australian English phonology, New Zealand English phonology, and English phonology
English	General American	feel	[fiːɫ]	'feel'	Most often apical; can be always dark in Australia and New Zealand. See Australian English phonology, New Zealand English phonology, and English phonology
English	New Zealand	feel	[fiːɫ]	'feel'	Most often apical; can be always dark in Australia and New Zealand. See Australian English phonology, New Zealand English phonology, and English phonology
English	Received Pronunciation	feel	[fiːɫ]	'feel'	Most often apical; can be always dark in Australia and New Zealand. See Australian English phonology, New Zealand English phonology, and English phonology
English	South African	feel	[fiːɫ]	'feel'	Most often apical; can be always dark in Australia and New Zealand. See Australian English phonology, New Zealand English phonology, and English phonology
English	Scottish	loch	[ɫɔx]	'loch'	Can be always dark except in some borrowings from Scottish Gaelic
Greek	Northern dialects	μπάλα/bálla	[ˈbaɫa]	'ball'	Allophone of /l/ before /a o u/. See Modern Greek phonology
Georgian		ჟოლო/zholo	[ˈʒo̞ɫo̞]	'raspberry'	An allophone of /l/ before /o u/ and /a/. See Georgian phonology
Kurdish	Sorani	gâlta/گاڵتا	[gɑːɫˈtʲaː]	'joke'	See Kurdish phonology
Romanian	Bessarabian dialect	cal	[kaɫ]	'horse'	Corresponds to non-velarized l in standard Romanian. See Romanian phonology
Serbo-Croatian		лак/lak/لاق	[ɫâ̠k]	'easy'	Apical; may be syllabic; contrasts with /ʎ/. See Serbo-Croatian phonology
Uzbek		Go'zal /گؤزل Гўзал	[gɒˈzæl]	'beautiful'	Apical; between a non-front rounded vowel and a consonant or juncture phoneme. Non-velarized denti-alveolar elsewhere.

==== Variable ====
Language		Word	IPA	Meaning	Notes
Portuguese	European	mil	[miɫ̪]	'thousand'	Dental and strongly velarized in all environments for most speakers, though less so before front vowels.
Portuguese	Older and conservative Brazilian	álcool	[ˈäɫ̪ko̞ɫ̪]	'alcohol, ethanol'	When [lˠ ~ lʶ ~ lˤ ~ lˀ], most often dental. Coda is now vocalized to [u̯ ~ ʊ̯] in most of Brazil (as in EP in rural parts of Alto Minho and Madeira). Stigmatized realizations such as [ɾ ~ ɽ ~ ɻ], the /ʁ/ range, [j] and even [∅] (zero) are some other coda allophones typical of Brazil. See Portuguese phonology

== See also ==
- Index of phonetics articles
- Lateral consonant
- Velarization
- L-vocalization
- Ł

== Notes ==
Place →	Labial					Coronal										Dorsal					Laryngeal			
Manner ↓	Bilabial		Labiodental		Linguolabial		Dental		Alveolar		Postalveolar		Retroflex		(Alveolo-)palatal		Velar		Uvular		Pharyngeal/epiglottal		Glottal	
Nasal	m̥	m	ɱ̊	ɱ		n̼	n̪̊	n̪	n̥	n	n̠̊	n̠	ɳ̊	ɳ	ɲ̊	ɲ	ŋ̊	ŋ	ɴ̥	ɴ				
Plosive	p	b	p̪	b̪	t̼	d̼	t̪	d̪	t	d			ʈ	ɖ	c	ɟ	k	ɡ	q	ɢ	ʡ		ʔ	
Sibilant affricate							t̪s̪	d̪z̪	ts	dz	t̠ʃ	d̠ʒ	tʂ	dʐ	tɕ	dʑ								
Non-sibilant affricate	pɸ	bβ	p̪f	b̪v			t̪θ	d̪ð	tɹ̝̊	dɹ̝	t̠ɹ̠̊˔	d̠ɹ̠˔			cç	ɟʝ	kx	ɡɣ	qχ	ɢʁ	ʡʜ	ʡʢ	ʔh	
Sibilant fricative							s̪	z̪	s	z	ʃ	ʒ	ʂ	ʐ	ɕ	ʑ								
Non-sibilant fricative	ɸ	β	f	v	θ̼	ð̼	θ	ð	θ̠	ð̠	ɹ̠̊˔	ɹ̠˔	ɻ̊˔	ɻ˔	ç	ʝ	x	ɣ	χ	ʁ	ħ	ʕ	h	ɦ
Approximant		β̞		ʋ				ð̞		ɹ		ɹ̠		ɻ		j		ɰ						˷
Tap/flap		ⱱ̟		ⱱ					ɾ̥	ɾ			ɽ̊	ɽ						ɢ̆		ʡ̆		
Trill	ʙ̥	ʙ							r̥	r		r̠	ɽ̊r̥	ɽr					ʀ̥	ʀ	ʜ	ʢ		
Lateral affricate									tɬ	dɮ			tꞎ	d𝼅	c𝼆	ɟʎ̝	k𝼄	ɡʟ̝						
Lateral fricative							ɬ̪		ɬ	ɮ			ꞎ	𝼅	𝼆	ʎ̝	𝼄	ʟ̝						
Lateral approximant								l̪	l̥	l		l̠	ɭ̊	ɭ	ʎ̥	ʎ	ʟ̥	ʟ		ʟ̠				
Lateral tap/flap									ɺ̥	ɺ			𝼈̊	𝼈		ʎ̆		ʟ̆						

		BL	LD	D	A	PA	RF	P	V	U
Implosive	Voiced	ɓ			ɗ		ᶑ	ʄ	ɠ	ʛ
Implosive	Voiceless	ɓ̥			ɗ̥		ᶑ̊	ʄ̊	ɠ̊	ʛ̥
Ejective	Stop	pʼ			tʼ		ʈʼ	cʼ	kʼ	qʼ
Ejective	Affricate		p̪fʼ	tθʼ	tsʼ	tʃʼ	tʂʼ	tɕʼ	kxʼ	qχʼ
Ejective	Fricative	ɸʼ	fʼ	θʼ	sʼ	ʃʼ	ʂʼ	ɕʼ	xʼ	χʼ
Ejective	Lateral affricate				tɬʼ			c𝼆ʼ	k𝼄ʼ	q𝼄ʼ
Ejective	Lateral fricative				ɬʼ					
Click (top: velar; bottom: uvular)	Tenuis	kʘ qʘ		kǀ qǀ	kǃ qǃ		k𝼊 q𝼊	kǂ qǂ		
Click (top: velar; bottom: uvular)	Voiced	ɡʘ ɢʘ		ɡǀ ɢǀ	ɡǃ ɢǃ		ɡ𝼊 ɢ𝼊	ɡǂ ɢǂ		
Click (top: velar; bottom: uvular)	Nasal	ŋʘ ɴʘ		ŋǀ ɴǀ	ŋǃ ɴǃ		ŋ𝼊 ɴ𝼊	ŋǂ ɴǂ	ʞ	
Click (top: velar; bottom: uvular)	Tenuis lateral				kǁ qǁ					
Click (top: velar; bottom: uvular)	Voiced lateral				ɡǁ ɢǁ					
Click (top: velar; bottom: uvular)	Nasal lateral				ŋǁ ɴǁ					
