= Alcazar Hotel =

Alcazar Hotel, named for alcázar, Spanish for castle or fortress, from Arabic اَلْقَصْر (al-qaṣr), is or was the name of a number of hotels, including:

- Lightner Museum, listed on the National Register of Historic Places (NRHP) as Alcazar Hotel
- New Alcazar Hotel, Clarksdale, Mississippi, NRHP-listed in Coahoma County
- Alcazar Hotel (Cleveland Heights, Ohio), listed on the NRHP in Ohio

== See also ==
- Alcazar (disambiguation)
