= Qasr el Banat =

Qasr el Banat is Arabic for Palace of the Ladies or Girls Castle and may refer to:

== Places ==
- Gasr Banat, and archaeological site near Bani Walid in Libya
- Qasr al-Banat, the ruins of a 12th century residence in the city of Raqqa
- Qasr el Banat, Faiyum Governorate, an archaeological site in the Faiyum Governorate, Egypt
- Qasr el Banat, Red Sea Governorate, an ancient Roman fort in the Red Sea Governorate, Egypt
- Qasr el Banat, Lebanon, an ancient temple in the city of Qsarnaba, Lebanon
