= Four Candles =

Comedy sketch

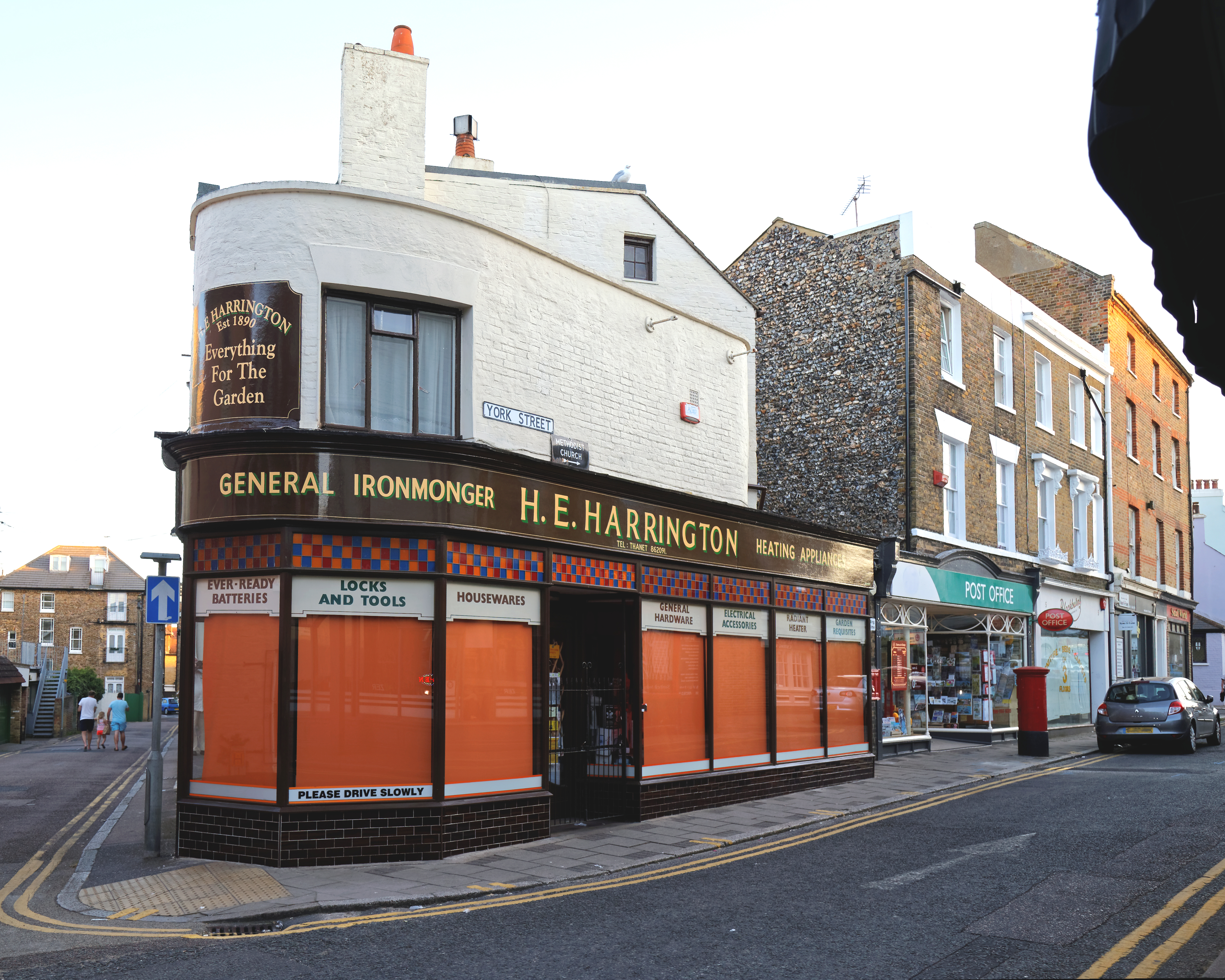
Harrington's hardware shop in Broadstairs, Kent, part of the inspiration for the Four Candles sketch

Four Candles is a sketch from the BBC comedy show The Two Ronnies, written by Ronnie Barker under the pseudonym of Gerald Wiley and first broadcast on 18 September 1976. Comic effect is largely generated through mondagreens, in the form of word play and homophones, as an ironmonger or hardware shopkeeper, played by Ronnie Corbett, becomes increasingly frustrated by a customer, played by Barker, because he misunderstands what the customer is requesting.

A script for the sketch in Ronnie Barker's handwriting was discovered on Antiques Roadshow in 2006 and subsequently authenticated by Ronnie Corbett, who noted that while it was unusual for Barker to write in red ink, it was undoubtedly his handwriting. Corbett surmised that the script might have originally been donated to a charity fundraiser, as Barker, being uncomfortable with appearing in public, would often donate an item to charity events rather than appearing in person. The title of the first draft was Annie Finkhouse.

The sketch was inspired by a real incident in a hardware shop in Hayes, which was submitted by the owners as possible material. Further inspiration came from the range of goods stocked by Harrington's hardware store, located close to Ronnie Corbett's holiday home in Broadstairs, Kent.

== Plot ==
The sketch opens with a throwaway joke as the hardware shopkeeper (Corbett) hands a lady a roll of toilet paper, saying "mind how you go" (a reference to the BBC series Porridge written by Dick Clement and Ian La Frenais, and starring Barker). The lady exits and the shopkeeper is then approached by another customer (Barker), who is holding a shopping list. The customer then requests what sounds like "four candles". The shopkeeper then takes out four candles, but the customer merely repeats his request and the shopkeeper is confused. The customer rephrases his request to reveal he in fact wanted "fork 'andles – handles for forks" (as in garden forks).

He then asks for "plugs". To try to avoid a similar mistake the shopkeeper asks what kind and is told "a rubber one, bathroom". Believing that he is asking for rubber bath plugs the shopkeeper gets out a box of them and asks what size. The customer's answer is "thirteen amp" revealing he in fact wants an insulated electric plug. He next asks for saw tips. Confused, the shopkeeper asks if he wants an ointment for "sore tips". After a better explanation the shopkeeper explains they do not have any.

He then asks for "o's". This item causes the most frustration with the shopkeeper bringing a hoe, a hose ("'Ose! I fought you meant 'oes!") and pantyhose to the counter before working out what he wants are the letter O for the garden gate – as in "Mon Repose". The box of garden gate letters is noticeably difficult to get to and put back, requiring a ladder. When he asks for "peas" the shopkeeper, believing him to be asking for the letter P for a garden gate, is annoyed as they are in the box he has just put back. The customer waits for him to get the box down again before better explaining what he wants – tins of peas. At this point the shopkeeper first suspects it may be a joke.

He then asks for "pumps" and the shopkeeper asks him to elaborate. The customer complies by asking for "foot pumps". The shopkeeper brings a foot-operated pneumatic pump to the counter. The customer then reveals he wants "brown pumps size nine". At this point the shopkeeper becomes convinced that the customer is playing a practical joke on him. After he asks for washers, the shopkeeper, out of desperation and annoyance, recites a long list of possible items. The customer then explains he wants tap washers, almost the only type of washer that the shopkeeper failed to list.

At this point the shopkeeper, having had enough, snatches the shopping list the customer has been holding to complete the order without any confusions. However, he then seems to take offence at something written on the list. He decides he cannot tolerate the customer any longer and calls his assistant from the back to complete the order. The assistant reads the list and opens a drawer of billhooks, asking "How many would you like, one or two?" (suggesting that the shopkeeper misread it as the profanity "bollocks").

== Variation ==
Barker later rewrote the ending of the sketch, citing the reason as dissatisfaction with the obscurity and coarseness of the "billhooks" reference. He revealed in the last episode of The Two Ronnies Sketchbook in 2005 that, instead of another male shop assistant taking over, a "big slovenly girl" would come out and say "Right, then, sir, what kind of knockers are you looking for?"

== Reception ==
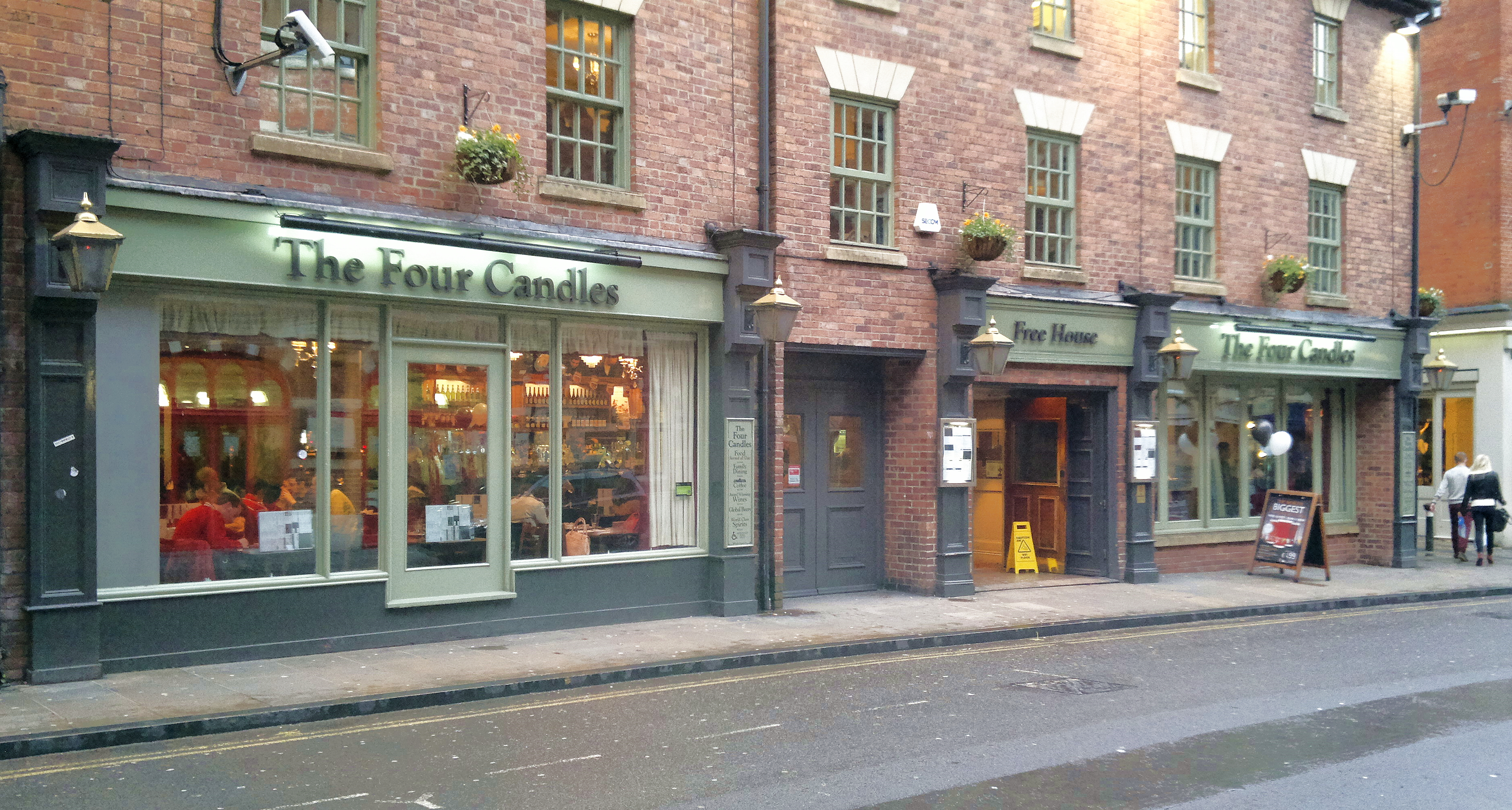
The Four Candles, a pub in Oxford named after the sketch.

It was voted 'The Nation's Favourite Two Ronnies Sketch' in a telephone vote on the Two Ronnies Night television special, broadcast on BBC One on 16 July 1999.

The sketch is widely held to be one of the most iconic sketches of the Two Ronnies. It was voted by the British public as the funniest comedy moment of the 1970s in UKTV Gold's When Were We Funniest?.

It was placed fifth on Channel 4's list of the fifty greatest comedy sketches of all time.

It was ranked sixth most memorable television event in a survey of 2,000 viewers on behalf of digital TV service Freeview.

At Barker's memorial service in Westminster Abbey, the cross was accompanied up the aisle by four candles instead of the usual two. Similarly, at Corbett's memorial service in St John the Evangelist church in Shirley, Croydon, four candles were displayed at the back of the altar. Corbett's memorial service at Westminster Abbey also had four candles at the altar as a reference to the famous sketch.

In Barker's hometown of Oxford, a Wetherspoons pub on George Street is named The Four Candles after the sketch.

The original handwritten script was sold at auction for £48,500 in December 2007. In 2018 it was offered for auction at East Bristol Auctions in Bristol, with an estimate of £25,000–£40,000.

== See also ==
- Juncture
