= Centenarium =

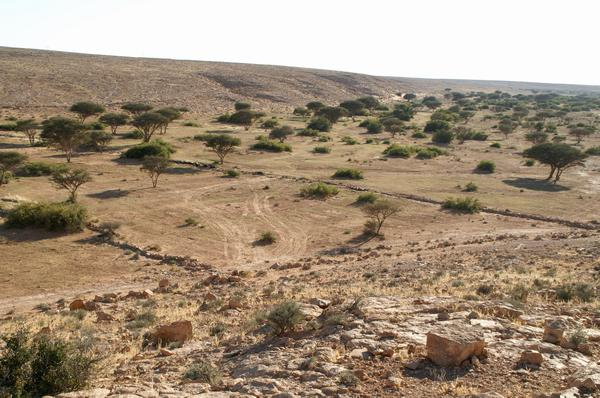
Remnants of "Centenarium" at Suq al-Awty

A centenarium, plural centenaria, is a type of ancient Roman fortified homestead with farming facilities and garrisoned by limitanei, placed in the Limes Tripolitanus (the limes of Roman Libya). The Limes Tripolitanus contained more than 2000 of these fortifications, connected to create a defensive system against desert tribe raids.

== Etymology ==
There is much conjecture about the origin of the word centenarium and whether it is etymologically tied to the locally built fortified farmhouses called gasr (plural gsur). According to archaeologist D. Mattingly, they probably owed their Latin name to the fact that one hundred men (100 is centum in Latin) worked each fortified farm, under the orders of a former centurion.

For the Latin word, Wiktionary has centenus (1. one hundred each; 2. one hundred (collectively); 3. a hundredfold) > centenarius (centēnus, “hundredfold” + -ārius, adjective-forming suffix: containing a hundred, or hundredfold) > centenarium (adjective, inflection of centēnārius).

== History ==
See also gasr, fortified farms from Tripolitania's hinterland, built and used between the first century BCE and into the Arab invasion of North Africa (647-709).

The first centenaria were built during the reign of Trajan (r. 98-117) and during the expansion of Roman Libya and Africa Proconsularis under Septimius Severus (r. 193-211), when the Limes Tripolitanus was established.

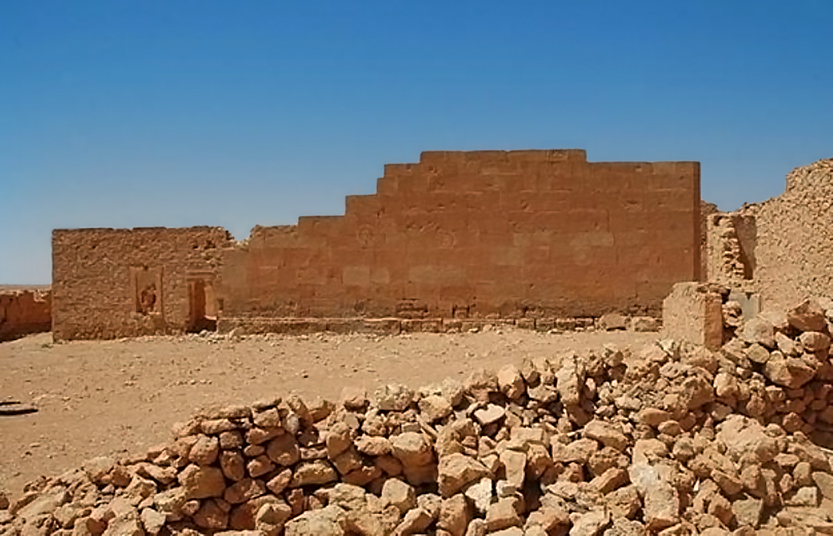
Gheriat esh-Shergia

From around the time of disbandment of the Legio III Augusta in AD 238, legionaries built around two thousand centenaria in the areas around Leptis Magna and Sabratha. Examples remain at Gherait esh-Shergia and Gasr Banat. Some were characterized by the presence of paleochristian churches.

Indeed, Leptis Magna, the main city in Roman Tripolitania, prospered mainly because Rome stopped bandits from plundering the countryside. The Roman Empire – mainly under Trajan and Septimius Severus – curbed unrest among local tribal groups with the creation of the Limes Tripolitanus and with the creation and development of cities (like Gaerisa) and forts (like Garbia) with Centenaria farms around the southern periphery of Leptis area. The centenaria system of production, based on autochthonous Berbers who were partially Latinized and often even Christians, was successful and worked very well until Byzantine times.

Centenaria remained in use for several centuries after the Arab conquest of North Africa in the second half of the seventh century, until the system collapsed in the eleventh century CE. Some have been turned into lavish villas, such as Suq al-Awty.
