= Alcázar (surname) =

Alcázar or Alcácer is a Spanish surname. Notable people with the surname include:

- Alfonso Martínez Alcázar (born 1975), Mexican politician from the National Action Party
- Ana Alcázar (born 1979), Spanish former female tennis player
- Ángel Alcázar de Velasco, (1909–2001), Spanish apprentice bullfighter, Falangist, journalist, and spy
- Antonio Alcázar (1902–1966), Spanish footballer
- Baltasar del Alcázar (1530–1606), Spanish poet
- Carmen Alcázar, Mexican political scientist, feminist, women's rights activist, and Wikipedian
- Damián Alcázar (born 1953), Mexican actor and politician
- Diego del Alcázar, 10th Marquis of la Romana (born 1950), Grandee of Spain
- Herly Alcázar (born 1976), Colombian former footballer
- José Alcázar (born 1957), Spanish water polo player
- Josep Alcácer (born 1979), Spanish football manager and former player
- Lucas Alcázar (born 2002), Spanish professional footballer
- Luis del Alcázar (1554–1613), Spanish Jesuit theologian
- Luis Paret y Alcázar (1746–1799), Spanish painter of the late-Baroque or Rococo period
- Matilde Alcázar (born 1995), Mexican Paralympic swimmer
- Paco Alcácer (born 1993), Spanish footballer
- Pedro Alcázar (1975–2002), Panamanian boxer
- Pedro Andrés del Alcázar (1752–1820), Spanish and later Chilean Army officer

== See also ==
- Alcazar
