= T. Paterson Ross =

Scottish-born American architect

- Born: Thomas Paterson Ross; Edinburgh, Scotland
- Died: April 26, 1957 (aged 83–84)
- Occupation: Architect
- Spouse: Belle
- Buildings: Alcazar Theatre, San Francisco, CA, Squire House, Palo Alto, CA

Thomas Paterson Ross was an architect of regional significance to the San Francisco Bay Area. Ross designed over 200 buildings during his career.

== Early life and career ==
A native of Edinburgh, Scotland, T. Paterson Ross came to San Francisco at the age of 12 in 1885. In 1890, he began working as a draftsman for architect John Gash, and by 1891, he produced an unusual design for the California Building for the World's Columbian Exposition to be held in Chicago in 1893. Although the design did not win the competition, it gained Ross recognition within the architecture community. In 1892, Ross produced plans for the Chapel at Cypress Lawn Memorial Park, for what appears to be the first building he designed as architect that was actually constructed. Ross would be featured later in the West Coast architectural journal, The Architect and Engineer, in 1908 and 1912, and in both instances, the Cypress Lawn Chapel would be featured as “a splendid example of his early work.”

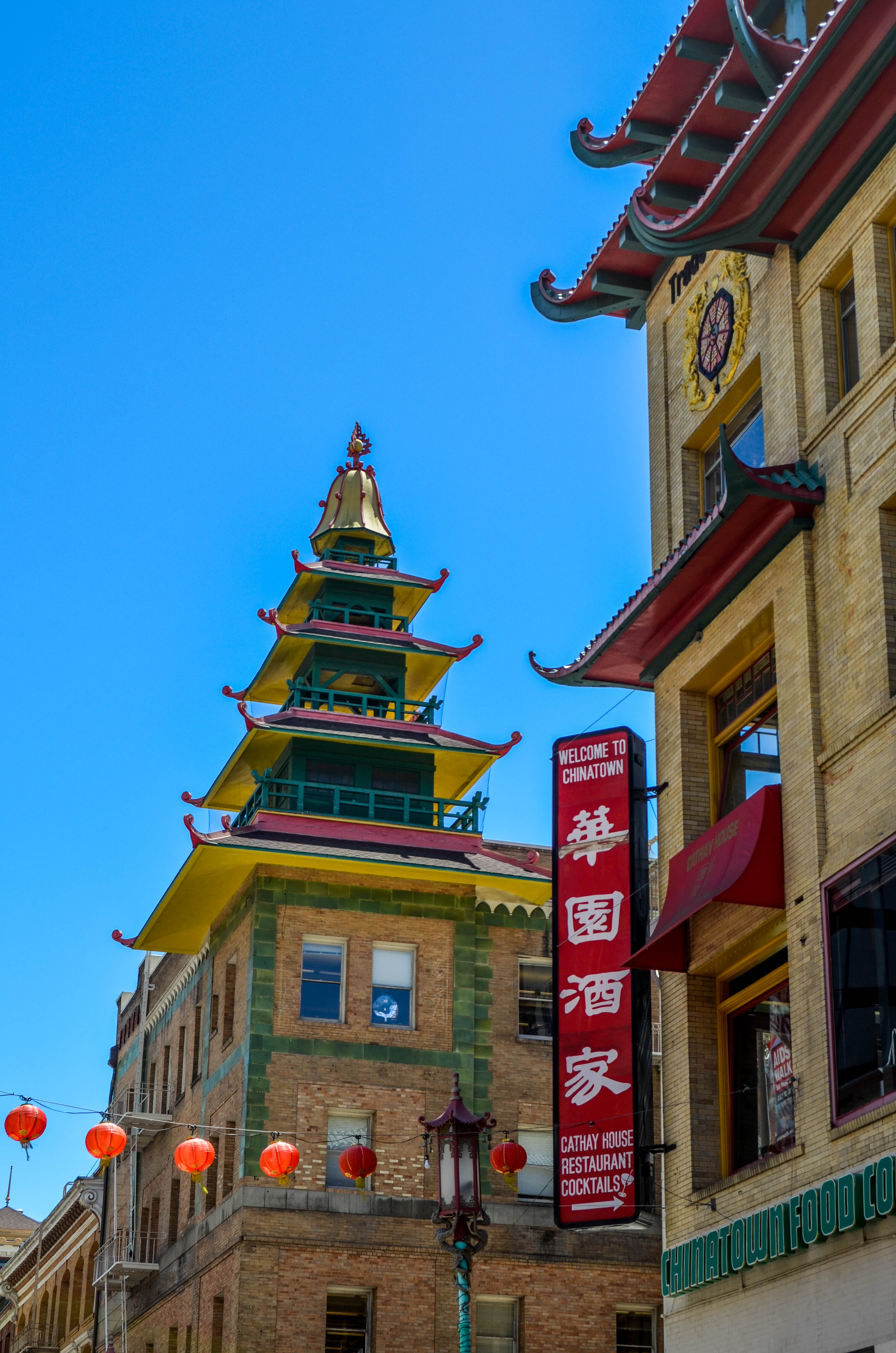
Sing Fat (left) and Sing Chong (right) buildings which set the trend for post-earthquake architecture in Chinatown

Ross worked for a few architects during the early portion of his career, including Louis S. Stone and Harry S. Munson (1892–1893) and for John J. Clark (1894), before entering into a partnership with Edward A. Hatherton in 1895. After the San Francisco earthquake and fires in 1906, Ross entered into partnership with engineer A. W. Burgren. Together, they designed a number of residential and commercial buildings throughout San Francisco, including the Sing Chong and Sing Fat buildings (1907), the Russian Hill Cooperative (1912–1924), and the Union League Club (1922).

In 1919, Ross received local publicity for his design of the Islam Temple of the San Francisco Shriners at 650 Geary (presently named the Alcazar Theater). Although a Shriner himself, his request to put his name on the cornerstone of the building had been declined, he chiseled in Arabic script in the marble above the entry door, the following passage: “Great is Allah and Great is Ross the Architect.” Although the Shriners threatened to file suit, no legal action ensued.

Other works designed by T. Paterson Ross include the Red Cross Building at the Presidio of San Francisco and the Summit Apartments in San Francisco.

== Accident and death ==
Ross’s career was cut short, during the height of his career, by a construction site accident in October 1922. During an inspection of building progress at the Union League Club (at 555 Post St.), while on an open freight lift, a wheelbarrow load of bricks fell on top of his head from the sixth floor, fracturing his skull. Although he survived and managed to live for another 25 years, he was paralyzed on his right half and unable to speak. He died on April 26, 1957, at the age of 84.

The Little Church of the Flowers, in Glendale’s Forest Lawn Memorial Park, is among Ross’s last designs. It bears a remarkable similarity to his first design at Cypress Lawn's Chapel. He is buried at Forest Lawn Memorial Park, Glendale, California in a section that the chapel he designed looks out on.

== Sources ==
- The Work of T. Paterson Ross and A. W. Burgen The Architect and Engineer of California, Pacific Coast States, Vol.XIII, May 1908.
- Some of the Recent Work of T. Paterson Ross, Architect, and A. W. Burgen, Engineer The Architect and Engineer of California, Pacific Coast States, Vol. 31, November 1912
- Tanzer, Virginia, Capo di Monte, Capo di Monte Inc., San Francisco, c1987
- Architect’s Arabic Name on S.F. Temple San Francisco Examiner, March 4, 1919, page 1
- Arabic Experts to Probe Frieze San Francisco Examiner, March 6, 1919, page 1
- The Architect and Engineer, Inc. (1919). Index to the Architect and Engineer, Volumes 55-59. Accessed May 13, 2017.
