= Rebracketing =

Process in historical linguistics

Rebracketing (also known as resegmentation or metanalysis) is a process in historical linguistics where a word originally derived from one set of morphemes is broken down or bracketed into a different set. For example, hamburger, originally from Hamburg+er, has been rebracketed into ham+burger, and burger was later reused as a productive morpheme in coinages such as cheeseburger. It is usually a form of folk etymology, or may seem to be the result of valid morphological processes.

Rebracketing often focuses on highly probable word boundaries: "a noodle" might become "an oodle", since "an oodle" sounds just as grammatically correct as "a noodle", and likewise "an eagle" might become "a neagle", but "the bowl" would not become "th ebowl" and "a kite" would not become "ak ite".

Technically, bracketing is the process of breaking an utterance into its constituent parts. The term is akin to parsing for larger sentences, but it is normally restricted to morphological processes at the sublexical level, i.e. within the particular word or lexeme. For example, the word uneventful is conventionally bracketed as [un+[event+ful]], and the bracketing [[un+event]+ful] leads to completely different semantics. Rebracketing is the process of seeing the same word as a different morphological decomposition, especially where the new etymology becomes the conventional norm. The name false splitting, also called misdivision, in particular is often reserved for the case where two words mix but still remain two words (as in the "noodle" and "eagle" examples above).

The name juncture loss may be specially deployed to refer to the case of an article and a noun fusing (such as if "the jar" were to become "(the) thejar" or "an apple" were to become "(an) anapple"). Loss of juncture is especially common in the cases of loanwords and loan phrases in which the recipient language's speakers at the time of the word's introduction did not realize an article to be already present (e.g. numerous Arabic-derived words beginning 'al-' ('the'), including "algorithm", "alcohol", "alchemy", etc.). Especially in the case of loan phrases, juncture loss may be recognized as substandard even when widespread; e.g. "the hoi polloi", where Greek hoi = "the".

As a statistical change within a language within any century, rebracketing is a very weak statistical phenomenon. Even during phonetic template shifts, it is at best only probable that 0.1% of the vocabulary may be rebracketed in any given century.

Rebracketing is part of the process of language change, and often operates together with sound changes that facilitate the new etymology.

Rebracketing is sometimes used for jocular purposes, for example psychotherapist can be rebracketed jocularly as Psycho the rapist, and together in trouble can be rebracketed jocularly as to get her in trouble.

== Role in forming new words ==
Before the increased standardization of the English language in the modern period, many new words entered its lexicon in exactly the way just described. A 15th century English cook may once have said something like: "Ah, I found this ewt and this nadder in my napron while baking numble pie." A few generations later the cook's descendant would have said: "Ah, I found this newt and this adder in my apron while baking (h)umble pie." Over the course of time these words were misheard and resegmented: ewt became newt, nadder became adder, napron became apron, numble pie became (h)umble pie. The force behind these particular resegmentations, and by far the most powerful force behind any such resegmentations in the English language, was the "movable-n" of the indefinite article a(n), of the possessive pronouns my(n) and thy(n), and of the old dative case of the definite article the(n). The biforms no/none, the prepositions in and on, the conditional conjunction an even, the shortened form n (and), and the inflectional endings in -n may also have played a part. Through the process of prothesis, in which the sound at the end of a word is transferred to the beginning of the word following, or conversely apheresis, in which the sound at the beginning of a word is transferred to the end of the word preceding, old words were resegmented and new words formed. So through prothesis an ewt became a newt. Conversely through aphaeresis a nadder became an adder, a napron became an apron, and a numble-pie became an (h)umble-pie. Many other words in the English language owe their existence to just this type of resegmentation: e.g., nickname, ninny, namby-pamby, nidiot/nidget, nonce word, nother, and notch through prothesis of n; auger, umpire, orange, eyas, atomy, emony, ouch, and aitch-bone, through aphaeresis of n.

=== Creation of productive affixes ===
Many productive affixes have been created by rebracketing, such as -athon from Marathon, -holic from alcoholic, and so on. These unetymological affixes are libfixes.

== Examples ==
- The origins of the word hamburger were in a form of ground meat dish originating from Hamburg, Germany. The bracketing of the original was hamburg‧er, but after its introduction into the United States, it was soon factorized as ham‧burger (helped by ham being a form of meat). This led to the creation of the independent suffix -burger: chickenburger, fishburger, etc. In the original etymology, burg was town and burger was a resident, or something related to the town; after refactorization it becomes a chunk of meat for a sandwich, although a hamburger does not contain ham.
- The English word outrage is a loanword from French, where it was formed by combining the adverb outre (meaning "beyond") with the suffix -age, rendering a bracketing of outr‧age and a meaning of "beyondness" (from what is acceptable). The rebracketing as a compound of out- with the noun or verb rage has led to both a different pronunciation than the one to be expected for such a loanword (compare umbrage) and an additional meaning of "angry reaction" not present in French.
- The English helico‧pter, from Greek heliko- ("turning") and pteron ("wing"), has been rebracketed to modern heli‧copter (as in jetcopter, heliport).
- cybern‧etics (from Greek kubernān and -ētēs) has been split into cyber‧netics (as in cyber‧space).
- prosthodontics contains the prefix prosth(o)-, which arose by misdivision of prosthe‧tic into prosth- and -etic. The word comes from Greek pros ("in front of") and thē-, the root of the verb tithēmi ("I place").
- The dog breed Labrad‧oodle (a cross between a Labrador Retriever and Poodle) has been rebracketed to Labra‧doodle, leading to the -doodle suffix in other Poodle crossbreeds such as the Goldendoodle and Aussiedoodle.
- The word alcohol‧ic derives from alcohol (itself a junctureless rebracketing of Arabic al-kuḥl) and -ic. Words for other addictions have formed by treating -holic as a suffix: workaholic, chocoholic, etc.
- In Romance languages, repeated rebracketing can change an initial l to an n (first removing the l by analyzing it as the definite article l', and then adding n by rebracketing from the indefinite article un), or the reverse. Examples include:
  - Latin *libellu ("level") becoming nivel in Portuguese, Romanian, and Spanish, and niveau in French.
  - Latin unicornis ("unicorn") became licorne in French, via unicorne > une icorne (a unicorn), and finally, with juncture loss, l'icorne (the unicorn) > licorne.
- In Swahili, kitabu ("book") is derived from Arabic kitāb (كتاب). However, the word is split as a native Swahili word (ki- + tabu) and declined accordingly (plural vitabu). This violates the original triliteral root of the original Arabic (K-T-B).
- Many words coined in a scientific context as neologisms are formed with suffixes arising from rebracketing existing terms. One example is the suffix -ol used to name alcohols, such as methanol. Its origin is the rebracketing of al‧cohol as alcoh‧ol. The word alcohol derives from the Arabic al-kuḥl, in which al is the definite article and kuḥl (i.e., kohl) is based on the Semitic triliteral root K-Ḥ-L. The suffix -ome, as in genome, is occasionally suggested as being a rebracketing of chromo‧some as chromos‧ome, but see discussion at Omics asserting a derivation from other, similar coinages.
- In Scottish Gaelic, the definite article is pronounced run together with vowel-initial nouns without audible gap, similar to French. This union has provided a rich source of opportunities for rebracketing. Historically the article's various case-, number-, and gender-specific forms ended in either a vowel, a nasal or an /s/, the latter later becoming an /h/ over time. Over time, the last syllable of the article was either eroded completely or weakened and partially lost, but where rebracketing had occurred, what had been the final consonant of the article came to be treated as the initial of the following noun. Example: an inghnean ( < *(s)indā inigenā) gave rise to an alternative form an ighean (the girl) this in turn becoming an nighean. As a second, more extreme example, the Scottish Gaelic words for nettle include neanntag, eanntag, deanntag, and even feanntag. In addition, many forms of the article cause grammatically conditioned initial consonant mutation of the following noun. The original cause of this mutation in the Celtic languages was an across-the-board change of pronunciation of certain non-geminate consonants where they were either trapped between two vowels, or else between a vowel or certain other consonants. Mutation gave rise to yet more possibilities for reanalysis, the form feanntag mentioned earlier possibly being one such example. Calder 'A Gaelic Grammar' (1923) has a useful list.
- In the Mexican national anthem, written by Francisco Gonzalez Bocanegra, the phrase "mas si osare un extraño enemigo" (meaning "if a foreign enemy would dare") has been transformed over time, as colloquial vocabulary and pronunciation of the phrase changed, to become "masiosare", now understood to mean "a foreign enemy" of the Mexican state. This rebracketed term is now also considered an eponym to reference any threat (literal or symbolic) to the security of the Mexican state.

== Examples of false splitting ==
=== In English ===
As demonstrated in the examples above, the primary reason of juncture loss in English is the confusion between "a" and "an". In Medieval script, words were often written so close together that for some Middle English scholars it was hard to tell where one began and another ended. The results include the following words in English:

- adder: Middle English a naddre ("a snake") taken for an addre.
- aitchbone: Middle English a nachebon ("a buttock bone") taken for an hach boon.
- another, formed by combining "an other" into one word, is sometimes colloquially split into "a nother" and a qualifier inserted as in "a whole nother issue".
- apron: Middle English a napron taken for an apron.
- auger: Middle English a nauger taken for an auger.
- chord: Middle English accord (harmony) taken for a cord, later influenced by "chord" (archaic name for a string), which has another etymology.
- decoy: Most commonly thought to stem from Dutch de kooi, in which de is the definite article and kooi means cage. An alternative theory is that the Dutch compound noun eendenkooi, earlier spelled eendekooi, meaning "duck decoy", from eend "duck" + kooi, was reanalyzed and split, in the process of being transferred to English, as een dekooi, in which een is the Dutch indefinite article.
- eyas: Middle English a niyas (from French niais from Late Latin nidiscus (from Latin nidus = "nest")) taken for an eias.
- humble pie: Middle English a numble taken for an umble (ultimately from Latin lumbulus, this is also an example of homorganicness).
- lone: Middle English al one (all one) taken for a-lone.
- newt: Middle English an eute (cognate with eft) taken for a neute.
- nickname: Middle English an eke name ("an additional name") taken for a neke name.
- the nonce: Middle English, for old English þen ānes (the one [occasion]).
- nuncle (dialectal form of uncle): Middle English mine uncle taken for my nuncle.
- omelette: Seventeenth-century English loanword from French, developed there via earlier forms amelette, alemette and alemelle from la lemelle ("the omelette") taken for l'alemelle; ultimately from Latin lamella ("blade"), perhaps because of the thin shape of the omelette (SOED).
- ought ["zero"]: Middle English a nought ("a nothing") taken for an ought. Ultimately distinct from Old English naught ("nothing"), of complex and convergent etymology, from na ("not") and wight ("living thing, man"), but cf. aught ("anything", "worthy", etc.), itself ultimately from aye ("ever") and wight (SOED).
- synth: short for synthesizer and evoked sometimes as an abbreviation of "synthetic" – from Greek-derived affixes "syn-" (together) and "thesis" (put) – literally "put together" (compare Latin-derived compose)
- tother: Middle English (now dialectal) that other taken for the tother.
- umpire: Middle English a noumpere taken for an oumpere.

=== In Arabic ===
In Arabic the confusion is generally with non-Arabic words beginning in "al-" (al is Arabic for "the").

- Alexander the Great has been interpreted in Arabic as Iskandar; by extension:
  - Greek Alexandreia (Alexandria) taken for al Exandreia (and thus Al-Iskandariyah; this is also an example of metathesis).
  - Greek Alexandretta taken for al Exandretta (and thus Iskenderun; this too is an example of metathesis).
- Visigothic Ulishbona (Lisbon) taken for ul Ishbona (and thus medieval Arabic al-Ishbūnah).

=== In Dutch ===
Dutch shares several examples with English, but also has some of its own. Many examples were created by reanalysing an initial n- as part of a preceding article or case ending.

- adder: As in English.
- arreslee (horse-drawn sleigh): From early modern Dutch een (n)arreslede, from nar "fool, jester" + slede "sleigh".
- avegaar "auger": As in English.
- omelet "omelette": As in English.
- spijt "pity, regret": From Middle Dutch despijt, from Old French despit "spite". Reanalysed as de spijt "the pity".
- Rijsel "Lille" : from ter IJsel "at the Isle", reanalyzed as te Rijsel "at Lille".

=== In French ===
In French similar confusion arose between "le/la" and "l'-" as well as "de" and "d'-".

- French démonomancie ("demonomancy") taken for d'émonomancie ("of emonomancy").
- Old French lonce ("lynx") taken for l'once, thus giving rise to once (hence English: ounce), now more often applied to the snow leopard.
- Old French une norenge ('an orange') taken for une orenge.
- boutique from Greek-derived Latin apotheca, a change found in some Romance languages (e.g. Italian bottega, Spanish bodega, Sicilian putìa), a putative proto-Romance l'aboteca or l'abodega taken for la + lexeme.
- licorne ("unicorn") from rebracketing of l'icorne; icorne itself comes from rebracketing of Old French unicorne as une icorne.
- lierre ("ivy") from Old French liere, a rebracketing of l'iere.
- Lille (a city in French Flanders) from rebracketing of l'isle ("the island")

=== In Greek ===
- στὸ Νεύριπον (stò Neúripon, Euboea), rebracketing of στὸν Εὔριπον (stòn Eúripon); then in Italian by folk etymology as Negroponte (negro 'black' and ponte 'bridge')

=== In Italian ===
- Cattaro (Kotor) from Greek Δεκάτερα, Dekátera splitting to De Catera (of Catera) in Italian, then to Cattaro (Serbo-Croatian: Kotor).

=== In Slavic ===
- Forms of 3rd person pronouns with initial ň- such as Proto-Slavic *ňego, *ňejǫ, *ňimi ('him', 'her', 'them'), etc. come from combinations of pronouns *jego, *jejǫ, *jimi, etc. with a group of prepositions with archaic and otherwise lost *-n ending (*vъn, *sъn, *kъn > *vъ, *sъ, *kъ ('in', 'with', 'to')), e.g. *kъn emu → *kъ ňemu ('to him'). Some modern Slavic languages such as Polish and Russian still use both the forms with and without the ň-, depending on whether the pronoun is governed by a preposition: Polish jego, do niego; Russian его, до него (ego, do nego).

== Examples of juncture loss ==
- ajar from on char ("on turn").
- alligator from Spanish el lagarto ("the lizard").
- alone from all one.
- atone from at one.

=== From Arabic "al" ===
Perhaps the most common case of juncture loss in English comes from the Arabic al- (mentioned above), mostly via Spanish, Portuguese, and Medieval Latin:

==== Spanish ====
- Arabic al-faṣfaṣa in Spanish as alfalfa, alfalfa.
- Arabic al-kharrūba in Spanish as algarroba, carob.
- Arabic al-hilāl in Spanish as alfiler, pin.
- Arabic al-hurj in Spanish as alforja, saddlebag.
- Arabic al-qāḍī in Spanish as alcalde, alcalde.
- Arabic al-qāʾid in Spanish as alcaide, commander.
- Arabic al-qaṣr in Spanish as alcázar, alcazar.
- Arabic al-qubba in Spanish as alcoba, alcove.
- Arabic al-ʿuṣāra in Spanish as alizari, madder root.
- Arabic ar-rub in Spanish as arroba, a unit of measure.
- Arabic az-zahr ("the dice") in Spanish as azar, "randomness", and in French and English as "hazard"
- Arabic al-fīl ("the elephant") in Spanish as alfil "chess bishop" and in Italian as alfiere "chess bishop" (whose Russian name слон (slon) also means "elephant").
- Arabic al-bakūra in Spanish as albacora, albacore.
- Arabic al-ġaṭṭās in Spanish as alcatraz, gannet.
- Arabic al-qanṭara ("the bridge") in Spanish as Alcántara.

==== Medieval Latin ====
- Arabic al-ʾanbīq in Medieval Latin as alembicus, alembic.
- Arabic al-dabarān in Medieval Latin as Aldebaran, Aldebaran.
- Arabic al-ḥinnāʾ in Medieval Latin as alchanna, henna.
- Arabic al-ʿiḍāda in Medieval Latin as alidada, sighting rod.
- Arabic al-jabr in Medieval Latin as algebra, algebra.
- Arabic al-Khwarizmi in Medieval Latin as algorismus, algorithm.
- Arabic al-kīmiyāʾ in Medieval Latin as alchymia, alchemy.
- Arabic al-kuḥl (powdered antimony) in Medieval Latin as alcohol, which see for the change of meaning.
- Arabic al-naṭḥ in Medieval Latin as Alnath, Elnath (a star).
- Arabic al-qily in Medieval Latin as alkali, alkali.
- Arabic al-qurʾān in Medieval Latin as alcorānum, Koran.

==== Other ====
- Arabic al-ġūl in English as Algol.
- Arabic al-majisti in French as almageste, almagest.
- Arabic al-minbar in Medieval Hebrew as ʾalmēmār, bema.
- Arabic al-qaly in English as alkali, alkaline.
- Arabic al-kuħl in Old French as alcohol (modern French alcool), and in English as alcohol.

=== In Greek ===
Junctural metanalysis played a role in the development of new words in the earliest period of Greek literature: during the oral transmission of the Homeric epics. Many words in the Homeric epics that are etymologically inexplicable through normal linguistic analysis begin to make some sense when junctural metanalysis at some stage in the transmission is assumed: e.g., the formula eche nedumos hypnos "sweet sleep held (him)" appears to be a resegmentation of echen edumos hypnos. Steve Reece has discovered several dozen similar instances of metanalysis in Homer, thereby shedding new light on their etymologies.

Juncture loss is common in later Greek as well, especially in place names, or in borrowings of Greek names in Italian and Turkish, where particles (εις, στην, στον, σε) are fused with the original name. In the Cretan dialect, the se- prefix was also found in common nouns, such as secambo or tsecambo < se- + cambo 'a plain'.

Examples:

- Prefix "stan" < στήν 'at', 'to'
  - Istanbul or Stamboul and Stimpoli, Crete, from "στην Πόλη" [stimˈboli], 'in the city' or 'to the city'
  - İstanköy, Stanco for the island of Kos
  - Standia for the island of Dia
- Prefix "s-" < σε 'at'
  - Satines for Athines (Athens), etc.
  - Samsun (s'Amison from "se" and "Amisos")
  - Sdille for Delos
  - Susam for Samos
  - Samastro for Amasra (Greek Amastris)
  - Sitia.
  - Stamiro (?)
  - Stalimure (?)
- Prefix 'is' < εις 'at', 'to'
  - İzmit from Media, with earlier İznikmit from Nicomedia
  - İzmir from Smyrna
  - İznik from Nicaea ([iz nikea])
- Other
  - Navarino for earlier Avarino

== See also ==
- Apheresis
- Apocope
- Back-formation
- Clipping
- Eggcorn
- Juncture
- Mondegreen
- Scunthorpe problem
- Synalepha
- Synaeresis
- Syncope
- Univerbation
