= Gasr Banat =

Archaeological site in Libya

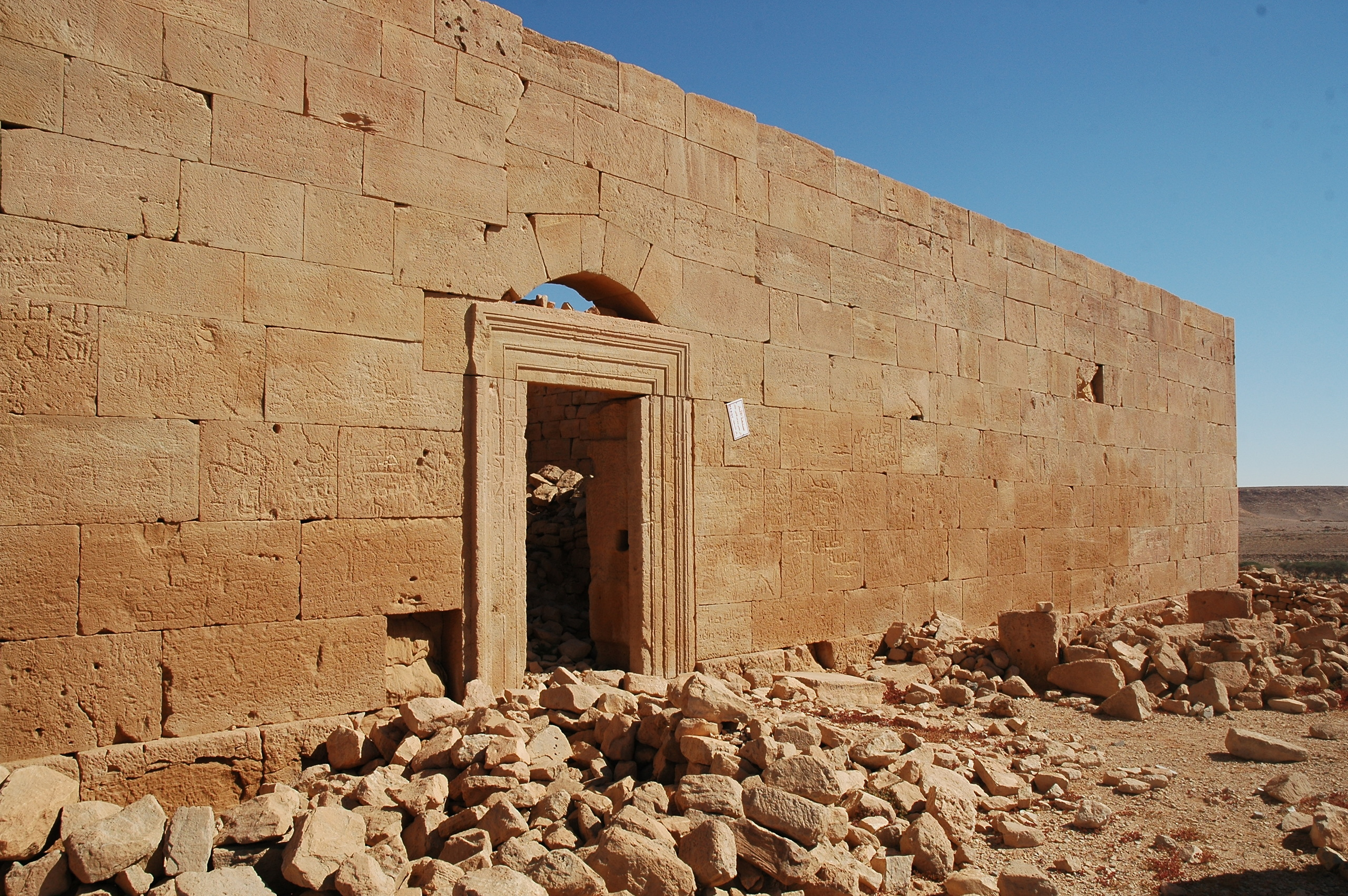

- Location within Libya
- 31.461833°N 14.704528°E
- Type: Fort
- Periods: Ancient Rome
- Location: Libya

Site notes
- Archaeologists: Graeme Barker

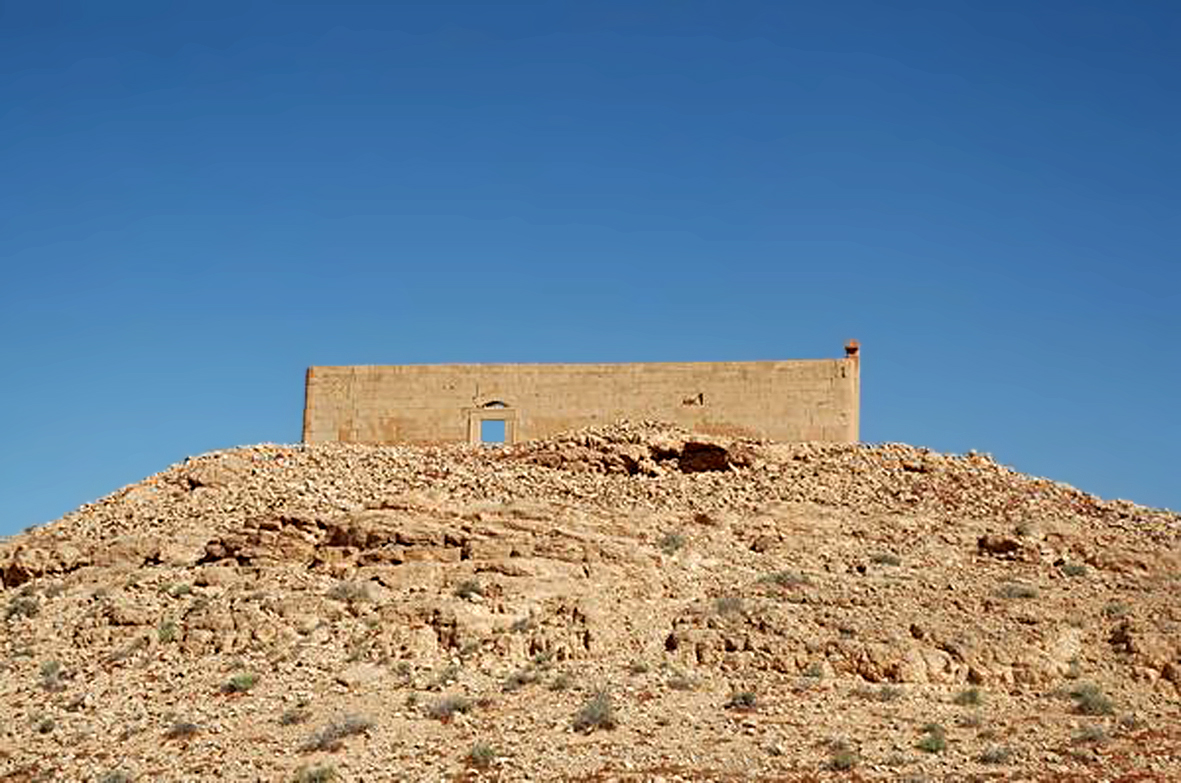
Gasr Banat picture near Bani Walid City

Gasr Banat or Gasr Isawi is an archaeological site near Bani Walid in Libya and the location of an Ancient Roman centenarium or "perched" oppidum. The area is also used as a semi-permanent camp for nomads. It was studied by Graeme Barker in 1984. Evidence from pottery found around the site suggests the date of construction was in the third century CE.

The centenarium has a striking resemblance to one in Gherait esh-Shergia north of Wadi Nefud. There is an ancient temple-type mausoleum dating to the same period as the centenarium in the valley, which contains a burial chamber decorated with fish. There are also remains of a Roman quarry and dams in the nearby wadi.

This particular centenarium was used frequently for several centuries. Around this centenarium there were medieval walls of old building that surrounded the building and were demolished due to natural or war related circumstances. However, regardless of the fallen walls the centenarium remained to be in a fairly good condition.
