= Alcalá, Tomina =

Coordinates: 19°22′S 64°25′W

Alcalá
- Town
- Interactive map of Alcalá
- Country: Bolivia
- Department: Chuquisaca
- Province: Tomina
- Municipality: Tomina
- Time zone: UTC-4 (BOT)

Alcalá is a Bolivian town in Tomina Municipality, Tomina Province, Chuquisaca Department. In 2010 it had an estimated population of 1094.
