= Guido Rodríguez Alcalá =

Guido Rodriguez Alcalá
- Born: October 6, 1946 (age 79) Asunción, Paraguay
- Occupation: Poet
- Genre: Paraguayan poet
- Musical career

Guido Rodriguez Alcalá (born Asunción, Paraguay, 1946) is a poet, narrator, historian, journalist, essayist, and literary critic. He is an assiduous collaborator in different local and international newspapers.

== Work ==
- Artigas y La Independencia del Paraguay (Artigas and Paraguay’s Independence – compilation)

This play has a wide selection of letters interchanged between Artigas and Paraguay’s Government Board, that show some less known aspects of Paraguayan history. The author includes explanations.

- Residentas, destinadas y traidoras (Residents, destined and traitors)

This play includes vivid stories from the protagonists of the Paraguayan War, compiled by Guido Rodríguez Alcalá. The residents were the women that didn’t have any misfortune with the president. The destined or traitor ones, were the women destined to go into the concentration camps for being relatives of enemies of the president.

- In his novel Caballero, he quoted:

And that is not all, that were just little things that happened at the beginning, I mean at the end of the war, because the Brazilians didn’t want to hear talk about an armed Paraguayan with a knowledge; they didn’t want us to have an army… they didn’t trust us, that’s why they stayed here until 1887… but back then, any soldier would go out to the street, out of his barracks, and right there he was grabbed among two or three other men, when they could grab them, there was no security.. there was no respect, no police, no nothing… there were police, but they were like four stupid men armed with sticks, and that didn’t really work out to assure the tranquility, and then they realized that they needed an army; they needed something like us, to assure the peace and also for the liberals to not give away all the Chaco to Argentina. Because you would understand that Paraguay didn’t want to stay without its Chaco, neither Brazil wanted that a territory like the Chaco was given away to Argentina just like that, because back then, the Argentines reached Brazil until Mato Grosso and that could damage them. and that was when we agreed with the Brazilians, both of us against Argentina. ¡who would’ve said that we would fight that much! ¡who would’ve said that they had to pick me, me, the one who had liquidated so many regiments so many times! but that was my advantage in my trip to Rio: Paraguay’s provisory government had asked the Brazilians to hold me like a war prisoner because in Paraguay I could do a mess, they say, buy I took advantage of my trip to make good relations that would work for me.

In 2002, Guido Rodríguez Alcalá took farther Paraguayan history with his novel Velasco to put it correctly in its regional environment, in the time just before the independence, and examine the political processes that had happened to reach to it and to speculate with documented facts about what had happened.

In some way, Rodríguez Alcalá abandons his regular historical subject, based in the reestablishment of Paraguayan mystified figures by the dictatorship, to widen his perspective to the international connection of Paraguayan independence.

Besides rebuilding everything that had happened during the time in which Velasco was Paraguay’s governor, with the nucleus that pursued the emancipation, in it, the principal conclusion that we can get is that the Paraguayan politics has been hold on to the process of development of the neighbor countries, that’s why the incident of the exterior relations in national politics has been bigger than what usually people think and not only in the politic perspectives that guilt the other countries or the English imperialism of the warlike disasters.

This, in the end, refutes the isolating perspective of the official historiography. Velasco is one of the most transcended transparent rebuilding of a period, the moment of the independence, where there are many gaps.

As you can see, this narrative correspond to the common places of common treatments in the colonial time, to force the revisiting of this period, to ask themselves of the human reactions and to re-vindicate a new point of view that comes closer to what could`ve happened since the reinterpretation allowed by fiction.

== Comments ==
Guido Rodríguez Alcalá centered his last novel Velasco in one of those men who had marked the history of his country. The Colonel Bernardo de Velasco (was the first governor of the Misiones Province and since 1806 also Paraguay's governor) was the last representative named by Spain: in very unclear circumstances, Velasco was taken down in the night of May 14 and the morning of May 15 in the year 1811; and later included in the temporary government (supposedly independent) that was formed on May 16 of that year.

After a thorough documentation (this was the origin of his unpublished essay “Rasgos americanos de la independencia Paraguaya” (American features of Paraguayan Independence), Guido Rodríguez Alcalá, in his novel, gets close to the last moments of the colony and to the first moments of the independence. To do this, like he had already done in his two previously mentioned novels, he fictions the figure of an historic character, and gives him a voice, making him become the narrator, main character and witness of the facts.

The plot of Caballero and Caballero rey (as in many other stories of Rodríguez Alcalá) is that Velasco abandons the struggle of the Paraguayan War and its immediate consequences. Nevertheless, some of the resources like the insertion of different narrative voices, and the combination of real and unreal events are still maintained. And he continues with the tendency of building much more linear plots that make them easier to understand.

Against what would happen in the other two novels, the character now attracts the reader. And not just because we are not in front of a treacherous like Caballero, but also because Velasco lacks contradictions and invites to the credibility; and because the language used by the author incites the readers to identify themselves with the narrator. In fact, when we confront an unclear subject that is slightly manipulated by the official historiography, it seems that Rodriguez Alcalá is abandoning part of his previous attacking aim. In a democratic transition moment like the one happening right now, in the sense of the historic novel is slightly different from the one during the dictatorship: back then, attempting to the myths established by the stronismo was like battling to the regime itself; now, the novel retrieves its playful function without forgetting the investigation of truth.

And that truth implies stripping some of the affirmations of the official historiography: that way, Velasco says (page 58) that on May 16, 1811 “there was no tricolor flag ran up like people had said. The flag that was run up was the Spanish one”; and he says, “we swore loyalty to Fernando VII”. Regarding to the Communist Revolution, that some people interpreted like a preamble of the independence, Velasco affirms “it was not a rebellion against the law but against the Jesuits” (page 66).

Like it happens it his previous novels, Guido Rodríguez Alcalá plays with the word of his characters to proclaim situations that are extended in time much more than what the characters in the novels should know: for example, Velasco rush forth against the “local addiction of destroying documents”(page. 49); affirms that the guarani is “the language of the poor population and of the ignorant rich population, that among our rich people, there are lots of them” (page. 100);and he proclaims “books about Paraguay, unfortunately are not written or are not published” (page. 105). When that system isn’t enough to update the text, the author does not doubt to turn his characters into visionaries (“those porteños [...] will still guilt us of their own mistakes within 100 years” page. 176), nor going to the anachronism (Saturnino Rodríguez de la Peña appears like «the Poltergeist of the soap factory», page. 159).

However, the most used resource is the irony: «not a single French philosopher had taken care of this business, so we don’t have a fiction such as the hatch about the Jesuit system» (page. 84). An irony commonly used by the author is the one against the first Paraguayan dictator: in the margin of this considerations, we need to emphasize that as in his previous work, the text Velasco has many quotes of real documents: Velasco’s peaces of letters (page. 49), notes sent to the authorities (pág. 55), Cabildo’s transactions (page. 62), parts of the report written by Governor Pinedo in 1775(pages. 108-109), rules of the government (page. 188).Some of this are useful for the character to be able to respond to multiple questions that are made in the attempt to understand what has happened. This is just a reflection of the author’s costumes.

As we’ve seen, “Donde ladrón no llega”, “Vagos sin tierra” and “Velasco” are three approaches to Colonial Paraguay’s history and intrahistory. Three extraordinary novels that witness the validity of historic narrative in Paraguay during the change of century; and that show the existence of mature authors that had known how to create an own literary voice.

== Writings ==
Guido Rodríguez Alcalá has published work in almost every genre. His literary production includes, among others:

=== Narrative ===
- Caballero (novel, 1986) based in a historic character, to whom he demystifies with his own speech,
- Caballero Rey (novel, 1988)
- Cuentos decentes (1987),
- Curuzú cadete (story tale, 1990; got an award from Radio Curupayty)
- El rector (novel, 1991, rewarded with the El Lector price in the narrative category)
- Cuentos (1993).

=== Poetry ===
- Apacible fuego (1966)
- Ciudad sonámbula (1967)
- Viento oscuro (1969)
- Labor cotidiana (1979)
- Leviatán (1980).

He has also written lots of essays: Literatura del Paraguay (1980) and Ideología autoritaria (1987) and also some historic researches: Paraguay y Brasil, documentos sobre las relaciones binacionales, 1844-1864 (2007) about 20 years before the Paraguayan War and Justicia Penal de Gaspar_Rodríguez_de_Francia (1997) among others. Sometimes it is difficult to separate the narrative of the store in his work, because of the exhaustive research and the abundance of quotes and references.
