= Juncture =

Moving between spoken syllables

Juncture, in linguistics, is the manner of moving (transition) between two successive syllables in speech. An important type of juncture is the suprasegmental phonemic cue by means of which a listener can distinguish between two otherwise identical sequences of sounds that have different meanings.

== Typology ==
There are several kinds of juncture, the most widely used typology of which is:

plus juncture
Also known as open juncture, this is subdivided into internal open juncture and external open juncture. It is the juncture that occurs at word boundaries. In phonetic transcription open juncture is transcribed /+/, hence the name plus juncture.
close juncture
Also known as a normal transition, this is a transition between segments (sounds) within a word.
terminal juncture
Also known as falling, clause terminal or terminal contour, this is the juncture at the end of a clause or utterance with falling pitch before a silence.

Other less common typologies exist, such as the division (favoured by American Structuralist linguists in the middle twentieth century) into plus, single bar, double bar, and double cross junctures, denoted /+/, /|/, /||/, and /#/ respectively. These correspond to syllabification and differences in intonation, single bar being a level pitch before a break, double bar being an upturn in pitch and a break, and double cross being a downturn in pitch that usually comes at the end of an utterance.

== Examples from English ==
In English, a syllable break at the plus juncture sometimes distinguishes otherwise homophonic phrases.

- "a name" /ə.neɪm/ and "an aim" /ən.eɪm/
- "that stuff" /ðæt.stʌf/ and "that's tough" /ðæts.tʌf/
- "fork handles" and "four candles"

A word boundary preceded or followed by a syllable break is called an external open juncture. If there is no break, so that words on either side of the juncture are run together, the boundary is called an internal open juncture.

The distinction between open and close juncture is the difference between "night rate", /naɪt.reɪt/ with the open juncture between /t/ and /r/, and "nitrate", /naɪ.treɪt/ with close juncture between /t/ and /r/. In some varieties of English, only the latter involves a medial affricate, and only the former a medial glottal stop.

== In wordplay and games ==
In recreational linguistics, various types of junctures of are often used and played with in word games, in order to create or emphasize homophonic effects in pairs of same-sounding phrases. When pronounced without a pause between words (internal open juncture), phrases which differ in meaning and spelling may share a similar pronunciation. An example is "ice cream" /aɪs+kriːm/ and "I scream" /aɪ+skriːm/ (which is employed in the chant "I scream; you scream; we all scream for ice cream" that is familiar to many English-speaking children.)

The Two Ronnies comedy sketch "Four Candles" is entirely built around same-sounding words and phrases, including a taciturn customer's request for "fork handles" being misheard as "four candles".

In the world of word games, same-sounding phrases are sometimes also referred to as "oronyms". Such use of that term was first proposed by Gyles Brandreth in his book The Joy of Lex (1980). Since the term oronym was already well established in linguistics as an onomastic designation for a class of toponymic features (names of mountains, hills, etc.), the proposed alternative use of the same term was not universally accepted in scholarly literature.

== See also ==
- Eggcorn, a phrase that is substituted for a similar-sounding phrase
- False etymology
- Four Candles
- Malapropism
- Mondegreen
- Phono-semantic matching
- Rebracketing or "juncture loss"
