= Luis Espinosa Alcalá =

Mexican poet and songwriter

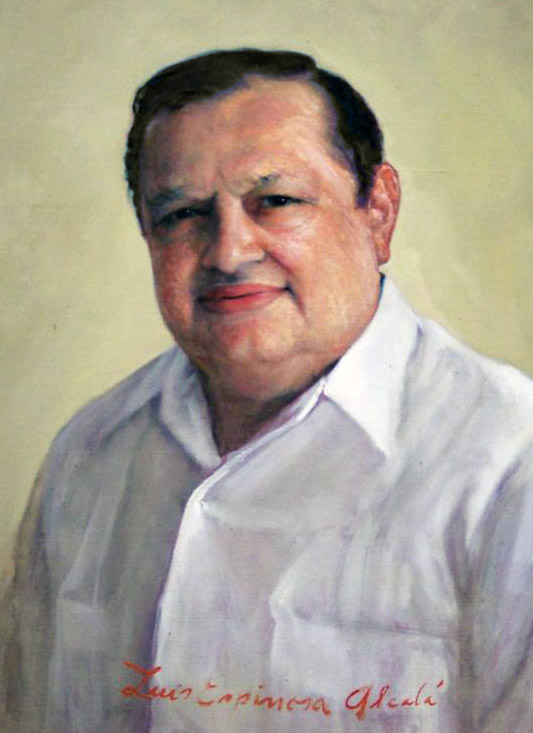
Luis Espinosa Alcalá

José Luis de Gonzaga Espinosa de los Monteros y Alcalá (June 21, 1932, Mérida, Yucatán, Mexico – January 1, 2009) better known as Luis Espinosa-Alcalá was a Mexican poet, songwriter, and music promoter.

Espinosa-Alcalá is considered the "Mayab's Musical Landscaper" due to his delicate use of ecphrasis to describe, for example, how one walks over a red carpet of Flamboyant tree flowers or sits on a bench in the central park of Mérida, Yucatán to enjoy the surrounding ambience. Many of his songs have become classics in regional music, such as "A Yucatán", "Mérida Colonial", "Guitarrita Yucateca", and "Flamboyán del Camino". Among his other well-known songs are "Ríe", "Silencio Azul" and "La Tormenta". Espinosa-Alcalá released under the Orbit Musical record label nearly 40 albums, including both his own songs and many others of musicians from the Yucatán Peninsula.

== Musical work ==
=== The landscape style ===
Espinosa Alcalá is recognized as the creator of the so-called landscape style within Yucatecan song, a strand also described as "Paisajismo Musical" (musical landscapism). In contrast to the romanticism prevailing in his day, his lyrics describe in detail places, scenes and cultural particularities of Yucatán, an approach later adopted by other composers from the peninsula. The combination of that descriptive writing with the music of his songs allows both local audiences and those from outside the region to recognize in them the traits of Yucatecan identity, and earned him the nickname "Musical Landscapist of the Mayab".

Among his landscape compositions are "A Yucatán", "Guitarrita Yucateca", "Mérida Colonial" and "Flamboyán del Camino", to which may be added "Progreso Lindo" and "Naranjita de Oxkutzcab", dedicated to towns in the state.

=== Genres cultivated ===
His catalogue spans diverse genres of the regional and Latin American repertoire. In 1960 he composed "A Yucatán", considered one of the first joropos in the Yucatecan repertoire; he later wrote the claves "Flamboyán del Camino", "Mérida Colonial", "Guitarrita Yucateca" and "Ríe", the bolero "Silencio Azul" and the bambuco "Noche Envidiosa".

=== Romantic songs ===
Alongside the landscape strand he cultivated romantic song, in pieces such as "Ríe", "Silencio Azul", "Noche Envidiosa" and "Cuándo". "Cuándo" won the Yucatecan Song Festival in 1950 and "La Tormenta" won the Guty Cárdenas National Festival.

=== Emeritan Trilogy ===
The sister cities of Mérida in Spain, Venezuela and Mexico named him Singer of the Méridas of the World for having been the first composer to dedicate songs to all three. The corresponding pieces, "Novia del Guadiana", "Mérida Venezolana" and "Mérida Colonial", are known collectively as his Emeritan Trilogy.
