= Alcalá de la Vega =

Municipality in Castile-La Mancha, Spain

- Municipality
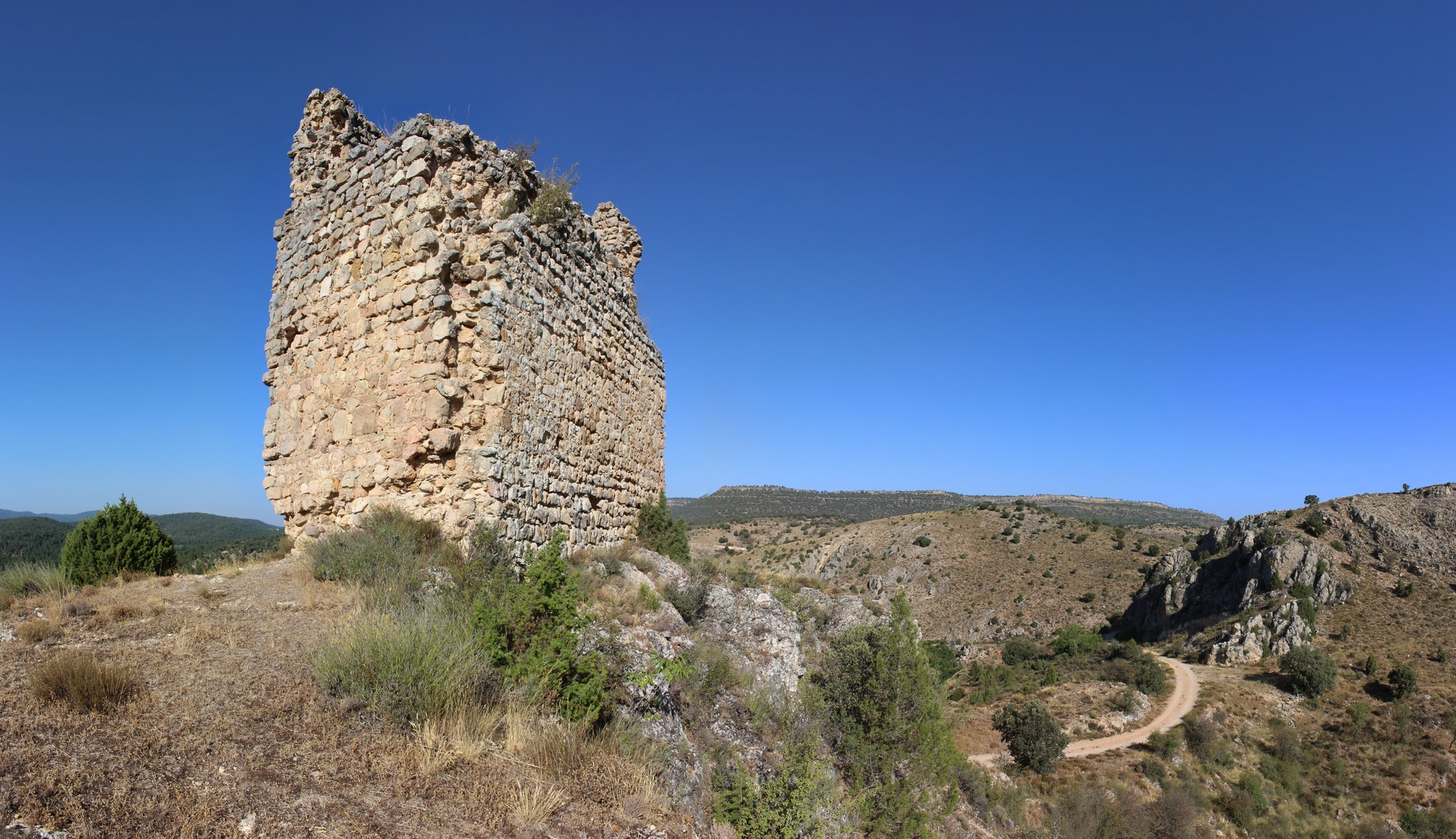

- Coat of arms

- Location within Spain Location within Castilla-La Mancha
- Coordinates: 40°02′N 1°31′W
- Country: Spain
- Autonomous community: Castile-La Mancha
- Province: Cuenca

Population (2025-01-01)
  - Total: 80
- Time zone: UTC+1 (CET)
  - Summer (DST): UTC+2 (CEST)

Alcalá de la Vega is a municipality in Cuenca, Castile-La Mancha, Spain. It had a population of 90 as of 2020.
