= El Alcázar, Misiones =

El Alcázar (Misiones)
- Municipality and village
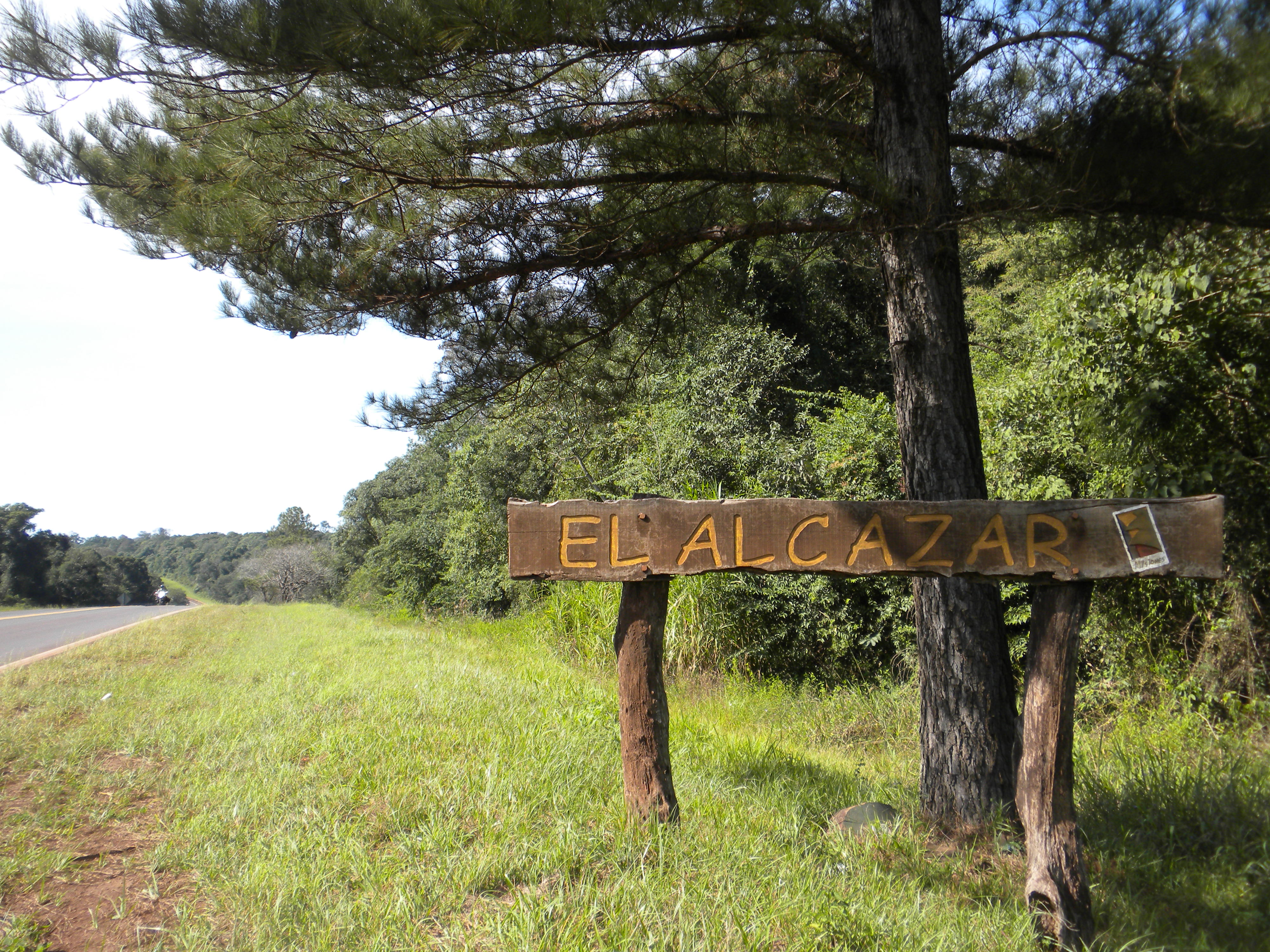

- Location within Misiones Province Location within Argentina
- Country: Argentina
- Province: Misiones Province

Government
  - Intendant: José Ferreira
- Time zone: UTC−3 (ART)

El Alcázar (Misiones) is a village and municipality in Misiones Province in north-eastern Argentina.
