= Qasr =

Qasr (Arabic: قصر, lit. 'palace/castle/residence from which power emanates', plural qusur), is a term derived from Latin castrum. It often occurs in toponyms.

Qasr, Qusur/Qusour can refer to:

== Qasr-type structures ==
- Desert castles: List of sites, includes several whose modern name does not contain the word qasr

== Individual qusur and places named after such ==
- ('small qasr')
- ('qasrs')

== Particular types of qusur ==
- Alcázar, also Alcácer or Alcàsser: cognate Spanish term used in Iberia and former colonies.
- Alcazar (disambiguation)
- Desert castles, category of Umayyad qusur, whose names usually have the form Qasr XY
- Ksar, North African form of qasr

== See also ==
- Glossary of Arabic toponyms: Qasr. Contains similar information to this page.
- Kasbah/alcazaba, from al-qasbah: fortress, citadel, or by extension, medina quarter
- Qal'a (Qal'at being the possessive form connected to the next word): Arabic for fortified place, fortress; part of many place names
