= Alcazar Theatre (1976) =

Historic place

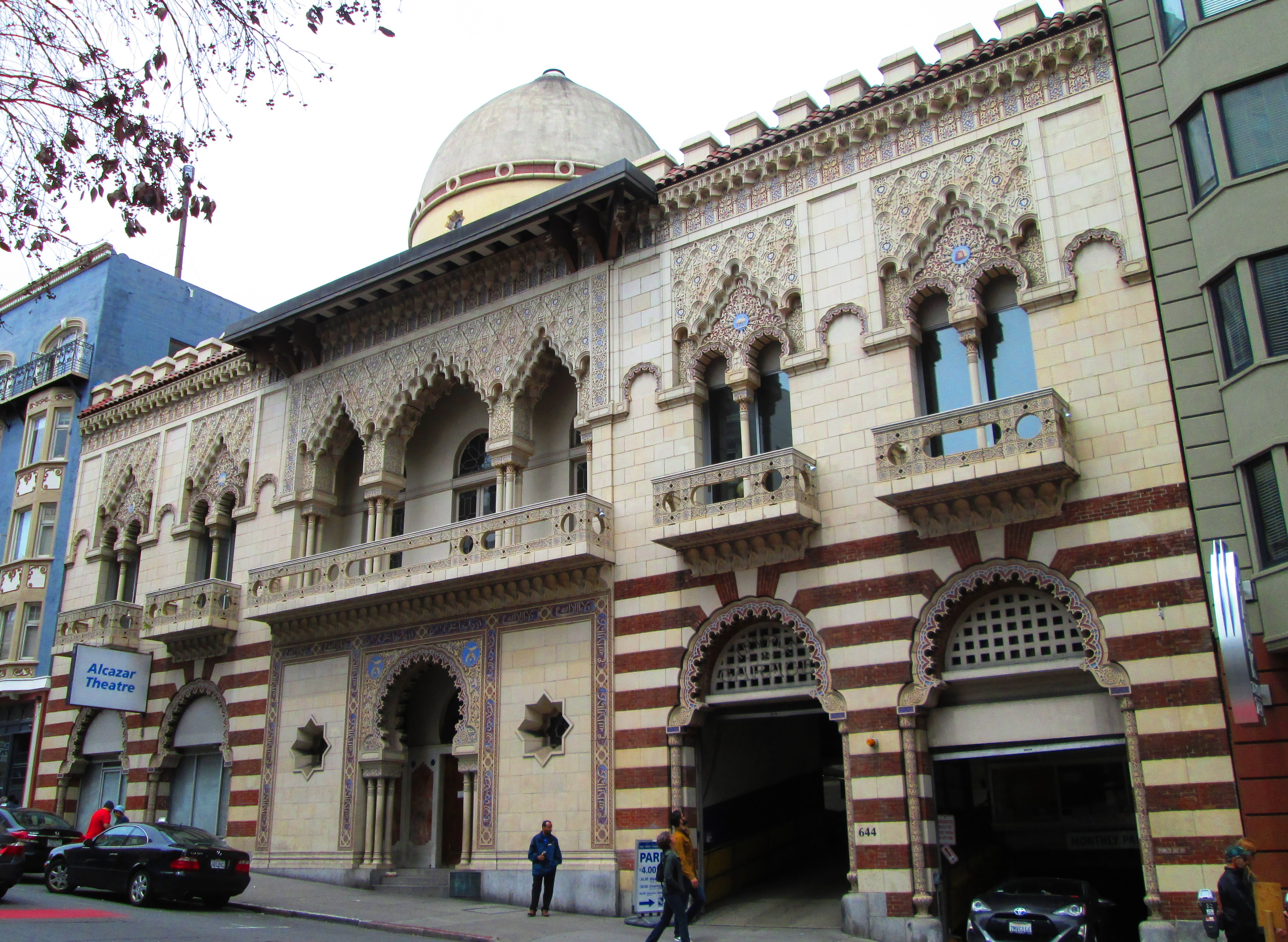
- (2017)

- Location within San Francisco County
- Address: 650 Geary Street; San Francisco, California; United States
- Coordinates: 37.78666°N 122.41399°W
- Capacity: 511

San Francisco Designated Landmark
- Designated: October 18, 1989
- Reference no.: 195

See also Alcazar Theatre (1885) and Alcazar Theatre (1911) for two earlier SF theaters.

The Alcazar Theatre is a 511-seat theatre located at 650 Geary Street, San Francisco, California. The venue is host to many touring productions of Broadway and Off Broadway plays, as well as variety, cabaret, comedians, and other theatrical events.

== History ==
Built in 1917 as a Shriner's Temple at a cost of $150,000, the building was designed in Exotic Revival style, looking much like an Islamic temple, by architect T. Patterson Ross. Upon opening, the June 1917 edition of Architect and Engineer described the building as "an adaptation from Alhambra, a building that stands as the highest mark of Arabian art and civilization." It served as a temple until 1970.

After the Alcazar Theatre at 260 O'Farrell Street closed on December 31, 1961, and then demolished, this former temple on Geary Street became a legitimate theatre in 1976 and took on the name Alcazar.

The structure was gutted in 1982 after attempts to salvage it failed. It reopened in 1993. Standing just west of Union Square, in the city's theatre district, the Alcazar has been renovated.

The Alcazar Theatre was listed as a San Francisco Designated Landmark in 1989.

== See also ==
- List of San Francisco Designated Landmarks
