= Alcazar Hotel (Cleveland Heights, Ohio) =

- U.S. National Register of Historic Places
- Cleveland Heights Landmark
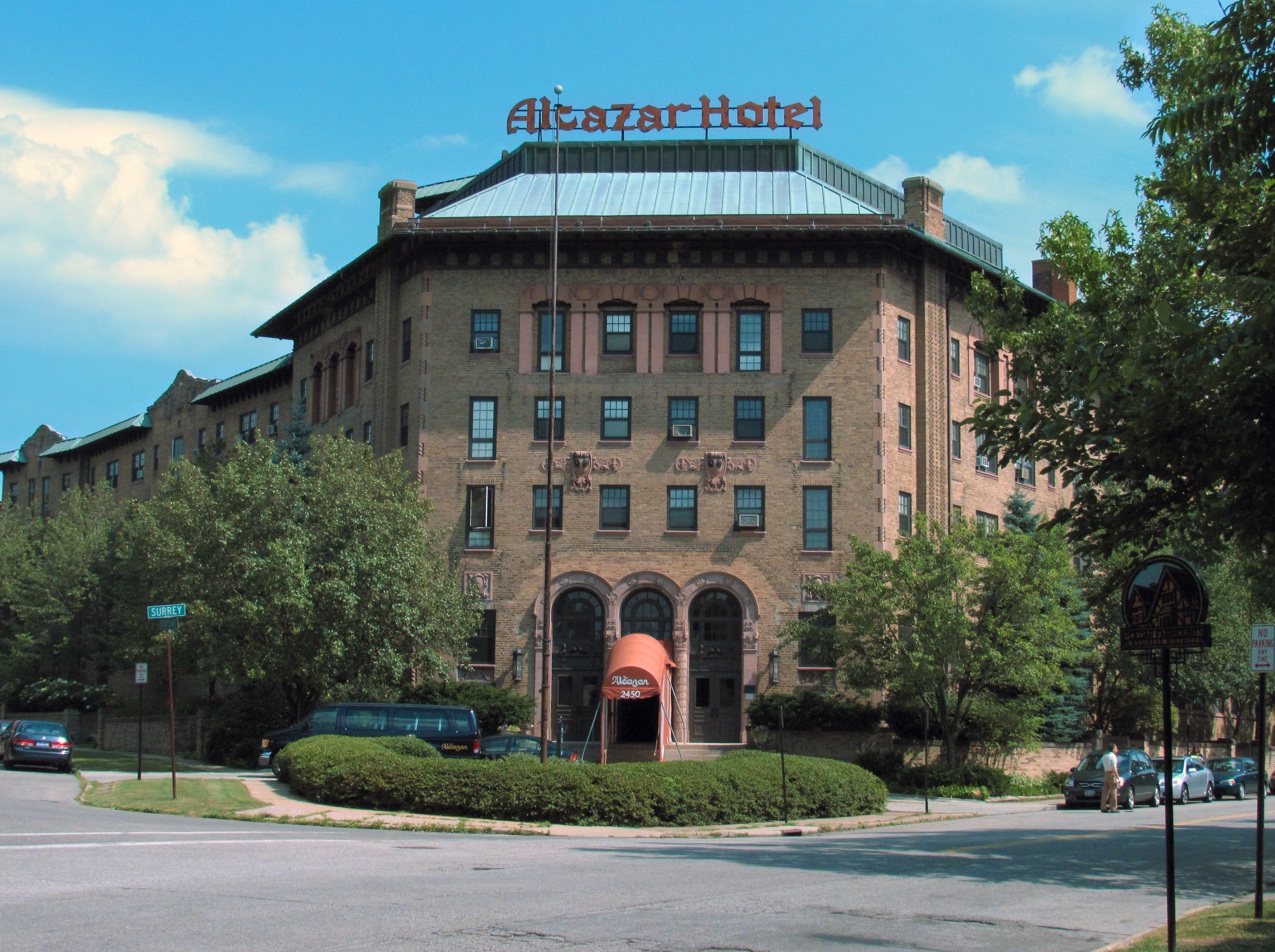
- The Alcazar Hotel, at the corner of Surrey Rd. and Derbyshire Rd.

- Location within Ohio
- Location: 2450 Derbyshire Road; Cleveland Heights, Ohio
- Coordinates: 41°30′9.34″N 81°35′35.49″W
- Built: 1923
- Architect: Fischer & Jirouch and Harry Jeffery & Son
- Architectural style: Spanish Colonial Revival, Moorish Revival
- NRHP reference No.: 79001805
- Added to NRHP: 17 April 1979

The Alcazar Hotel is a historic building in the Cedar-Fairmount district of Cleveland Heights, Ohio. The hotel was built in 1923 in the Spanish-Moorish style, based on hotels such as the Alcazar and Ponce de Leon in St. Augustine, Florida. The interior courtyard, with a covered arcade, is decorated with colored glazed tiles and a central fountain. The architect was Harry T. Jeffery; sculpture, decorative plasterwork, and fountain was done by Fischer and Jirouch. Prominent guests included Cole Porter, George Gershwin, Mary Martin, Bob Hope, Jack Benny, Lupe Vélez and Johnny Weissmueller. It has been said that Cole Porter wrote the iconic song "Night and Day" while staying at the hotel. The Alcazar was added to the National Register of Historic Places on April 17, 1979. The Alcazar Hotel is also a Cleveland Heights Landmark.

In 1963, the hotel was sold to Western Reserve Associates, and partially converted into a retirement home, with the remainder still used as a hotel. In September 2014, the Alcazar was sold by Western Reserve to Kirt Montlack Ltd. for $1.3 million. The developer eliminated the lodging units and converted the building entirely to apartments. In July 2022, the building was sold for $2.6 million to RP Derbyshire LLC, headed by Rico Pietro and Erik Loomis. The new owners announced plans to restore the original hotel lobby, dining room and other common areas on the ground floor.

== Historic uses ==
- Multiple Dwelling
- Hotel
