= Alcazar Theatre (1885) =

Coordinates: 37.78652°N 122.40709°W

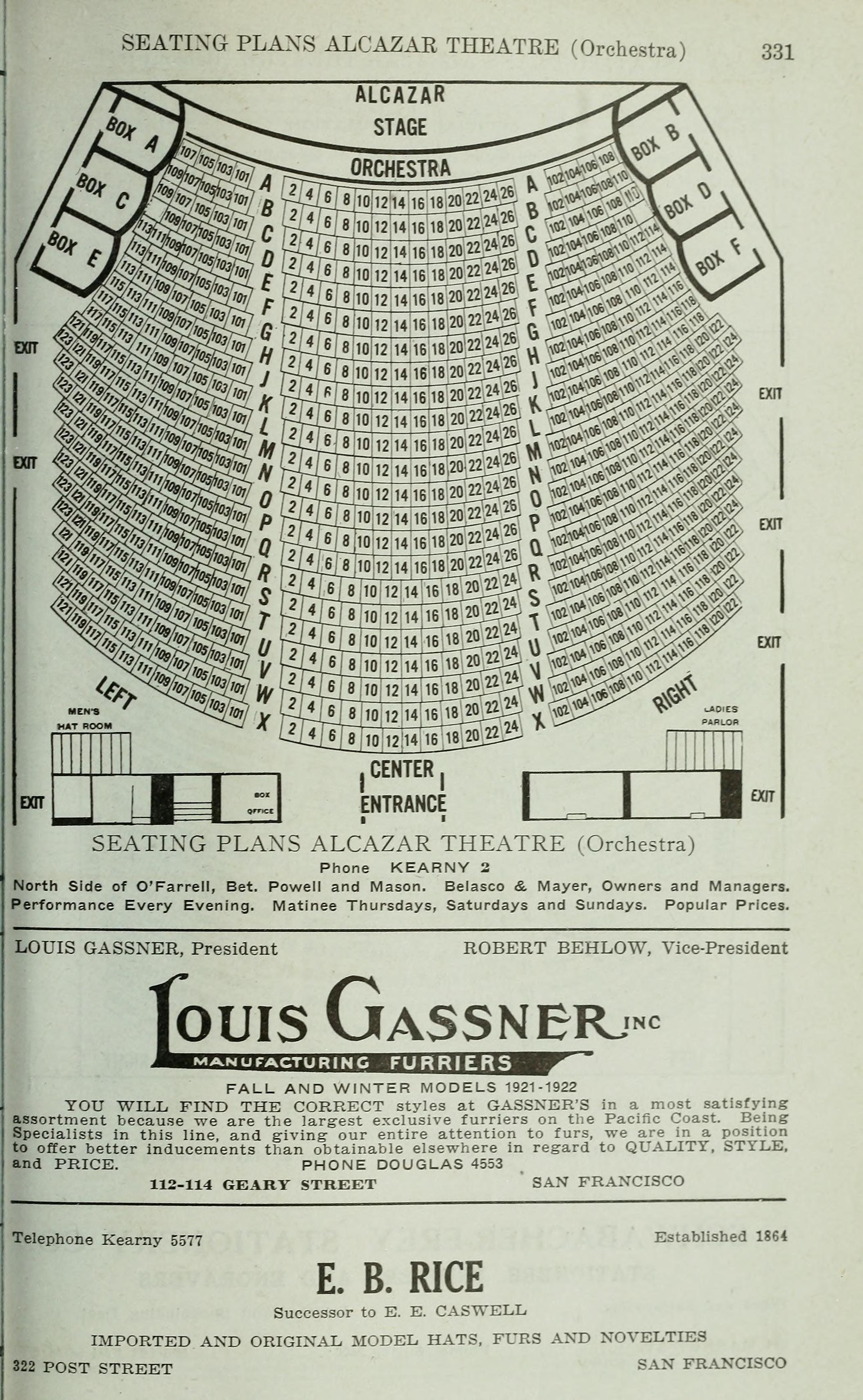
The theatre layout

See also Alcazar Theatre (1911) and Alcazar Theatre (1976) for two other SF theaters of the same name.

The Alcazar Theatre was a theatre at 116 O'Farrell Street, between Stockton and Powell, in San Francisco, California. Opened in 1885, the structure served as a lecture and music hall, but soon housed a popular resident stock company, which included Lillian Lawrence and John Craig in 1904; Maude Adams, Harry von Meter (before 1908); John Ince (in 1910); Howard Hickman (in 1910), Grace Travers (in 1910), and Evelyn Vaughan (in 1910). It was under the management of the younger brother of David Belasco, and Fred Belasco (1862–1920).

The Alcazar Theatre was destroyed in the 1906 San Francisco earthquake. In 1911, another Alcazar Theatre opened one block to the west.

== Bibliography ==
- Wilmeth, Don B (2007). The Cambridge Guide to American Theatre (Second ed.). Cambridge: Cambridge Univ. Press. ISBN 978-0-521-83538-1.
