= Dora Alcala =

American politician

Dora G. Alcala serves on the Texas State University System Board of Regents. She is a former mayor of Del Rio, Texas. She served three terms before losing the 2006 mayoral election to Efrain Valdez.
