= Alcazar Theatre (1911) =

Coordinates: 37.78633°N 122.40910°W

See Alcazar Theatre (1885) and Alcazar Theatre (1976) for two other SF theaters of the same name.

The Alcazar Theatre was a 1,145 seat theatre located at 260 O'Farrell Street, San Francisco, California, between Mason and Powell.

== History ==
The Alcazar Theatre was built in 1911 by architects Cunningham and Politeo for producer Fred Belasco, replacing the previous Alcazar Theatre one block to the east, which was destroyed in the 1906 San Francisco earthquake fire. This venue soon became one of San Francisco's leading legitimate theatres offering a wide range of productions, and like its predecessor, also housed a popular resident stock company. It was purchased in 1922 by Thomas Wilkes for $125,000 from the estates of Belasko and M.E. Mayer.

The resident stock company restructured after the theatre moved locations, and it included Viola Leach (in 1912; née Viola Wheeler), Bertram Lytell (in 1912), Louis Bennison (in 1912), Will R. Walling (in 1912), Charlie Ruggles (in 1912), and Evelyn Vaughan (in 1912).

With the advent of the sound film, and the Great Depression of the 1930s, after remodeling, the Alcazar became the Uptown Theater, a secondary low-price movie theater. In 1936 and 1937, it housed the Federal Theatre Project of the Works Progress Administration. In 1945, the theatre was used by the United Nations Peace Conference for some of its meetings, and afterwards reopened as the United Nations Theatre.

The building was renovated once again in 1952, renamed the Alcazar Theatre, and again devoted to legitimate stage productions.

== Handlery Hotel ==
The theatre was closed on December 31, 1961, and was torn down in March 1962 to make way for a parking lot for Hotel Stewart, which abutted it, but actually became hotelier (El Cortez (San Diego)) Harry Handlery's related Handlery Motor Inn. which later merged with Hotel Stewart and renamed Handlery Union Square Hotel.

Levi Newton Breed and David Kawānanakoa both died at the Hotel Stewart in San Francisco.
