= Alcalá de Ebro =

Alcalá de Ebro, Spain
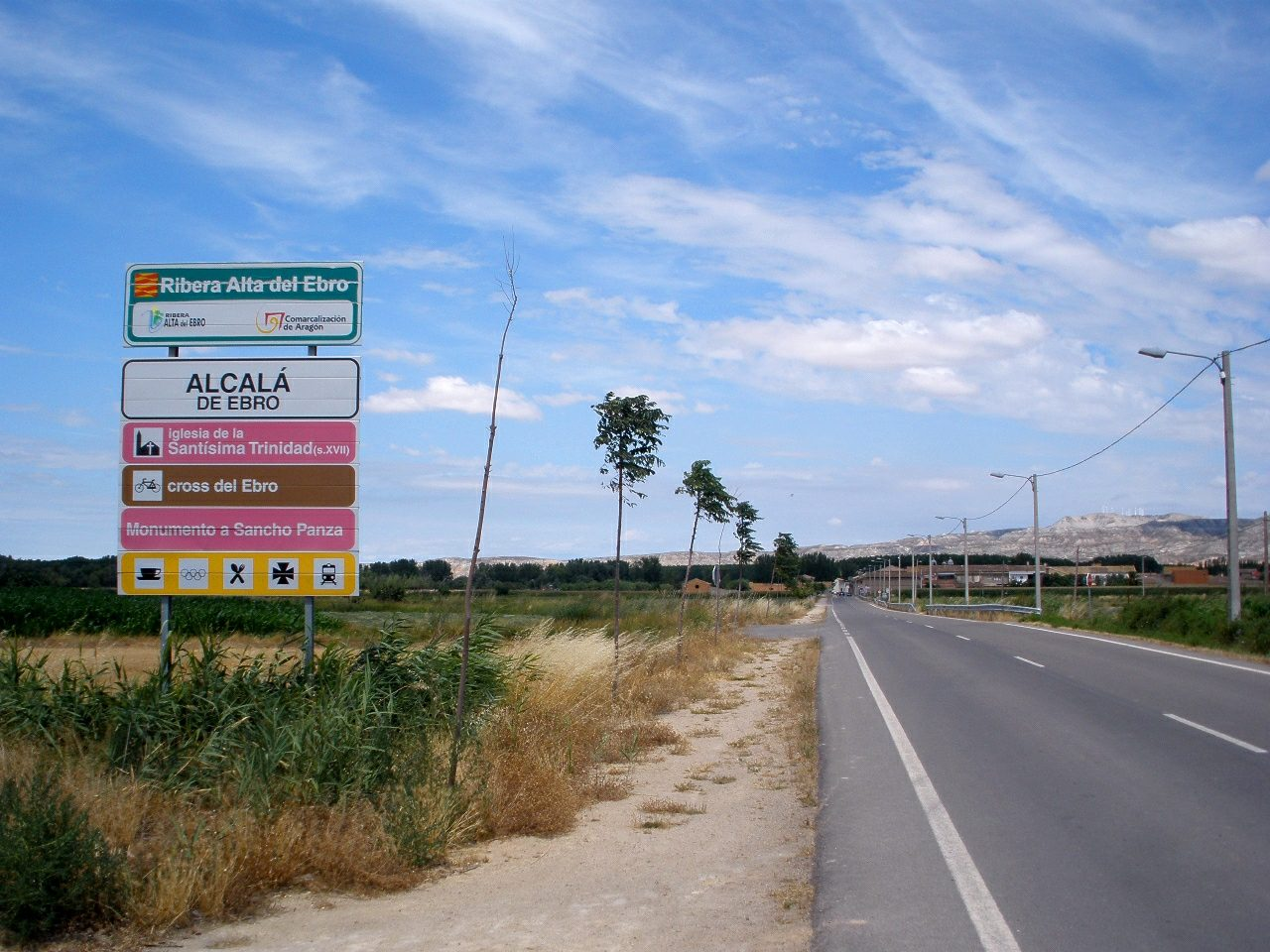

- Flag Coat of arms

- Location within Aragon Location within Spain Location within Europe
- Country: Spain
- Autonomous community: Aragon
- Province: Zaragoza
- Municipality: Alcalá de Ebro

Area
  - Total: 9.90 km^{2} (3.82 sq mi)
- Elevation: 223 m (732 ft)

Population (2025-01-01)
  - Total: 244
  - Density: 24.6/km^{2} (63.8/sq mi)
- Time zone: UTC+1 (CET)
  - Summer (DST): UTC+2 (CEST)

Alcalá de Ebro is a municipality located in the province of Zaragoza, Aragon, Spain. According to the 2004 census (INE), the municipality has a population of 279 inhabitants.

According to Jan Morris ("Spain", p. 33), Alcalá del Ebro is the fictional Isla Barataria which Sancho Panza ruled in Don Quixote.

== See also ==
- List of municipalities in Zaragoza
