= Marcel Alcalá =

American artist (born 1990)

- Born: 1990 (age 35–36); Santa Ana, California, U.S.
- Education: School of the Art Institute of Chicago (BFA)
- Known for: Painting, drawing, sculpture, performance art, poetry
- Notable work: Gallo Gallina (2024), Solita (2021)

Marcel Alcalá (born 1990) is an American multidisciplinary visual artist. They work in painting, drawing, sculpture, poetry, and performance art. Alcalá resides in Los Angeles.

== Early life and education ==
Marcel Alcalá was born in 1990, in Santa Ana, California. They are Xicanx (or Mexican-American), and queer.

Alcalá received a BFA degree in 2012 from the School of the Art Institute of Chicago. They were showcased as an artist-in-residence at the Skowhegan School of Painting and Sculpture (2022) in Maine.

== Career ==
Alcalá began hosting performances in Los Angeles and this became a part of their identity. They incorporated Payasa (clown) parties and developed this vision of utilizing clowns as a contribution to their art work. These performances were hosted at McDonald's in Los Angeles as well as in Chicago and Europe. Throughout these events Alcalá met various artists and learned about their work. They have worked with poet Emily Lucid to collaborate on writing their first collection of poetry called "Puro Silencio."

Alcalá has worked with various mediums such as oil pastels, oil, gouache, and acrylic to create paintings. Their solo exhibition, Gallo Gallina (2024), was showcased at Marlborough, New York City consists of ten of their new paintings and various watercolor drawings. In the Performance of Being, they primarily showcase oil paintings at the Night Gallery, Los Angeles in 2023. During 2020 and 2021, Alcalá held another exhibition called Solita, in the same location which consisted of oil paintings, gouache works, and ceramic pieces made during quarantine. Another pivotal moment in their career is having the opportunity for their work to be acquired by Cheech Marin since the inauguration of the museum in Riverside named, The Cheech Marin Center for Chicano Art & Culture, known to acquire one of the biggest collections of Chicanx works.

In a 2022 interview they stated they have written a poetry book, performed as a clown in underground clubs in Los Angeles, and have written a movie script in Brooklyn.

== Exhibitions ==
=== Solo exhibition ===
- Sissy No Fool (2019), Mickey Gallery, Chicago, Illinois
- Putas Unidas (2020), Tom of Finland Foundation, Los Angeles, California
- Solita (2020–2021), Night Gallery, Los Angeles, California (December 12, 2020–January 16, 2021)
- The Performance of Being (2023), Night Gallery, Los Angeles, California
- Gallo Gallina (2024), Marlborough Gallery, New York City, New York (March 7 - April 20, 2024)

=== Group exhibitions ===
- Goodnight House (2021), group exhibition, Fort Makers, New York City, New York
- Made in L.A. (2023), Hammer Museum, Los Angeles, California
- The Orange Curtain: Edwin Arzeta, Jackie Castillo, and Marcel Alcalá (2025), VSF OC, Tustin, California
