= Alcázar del Rey =

Municipality in Spain

- Municipality
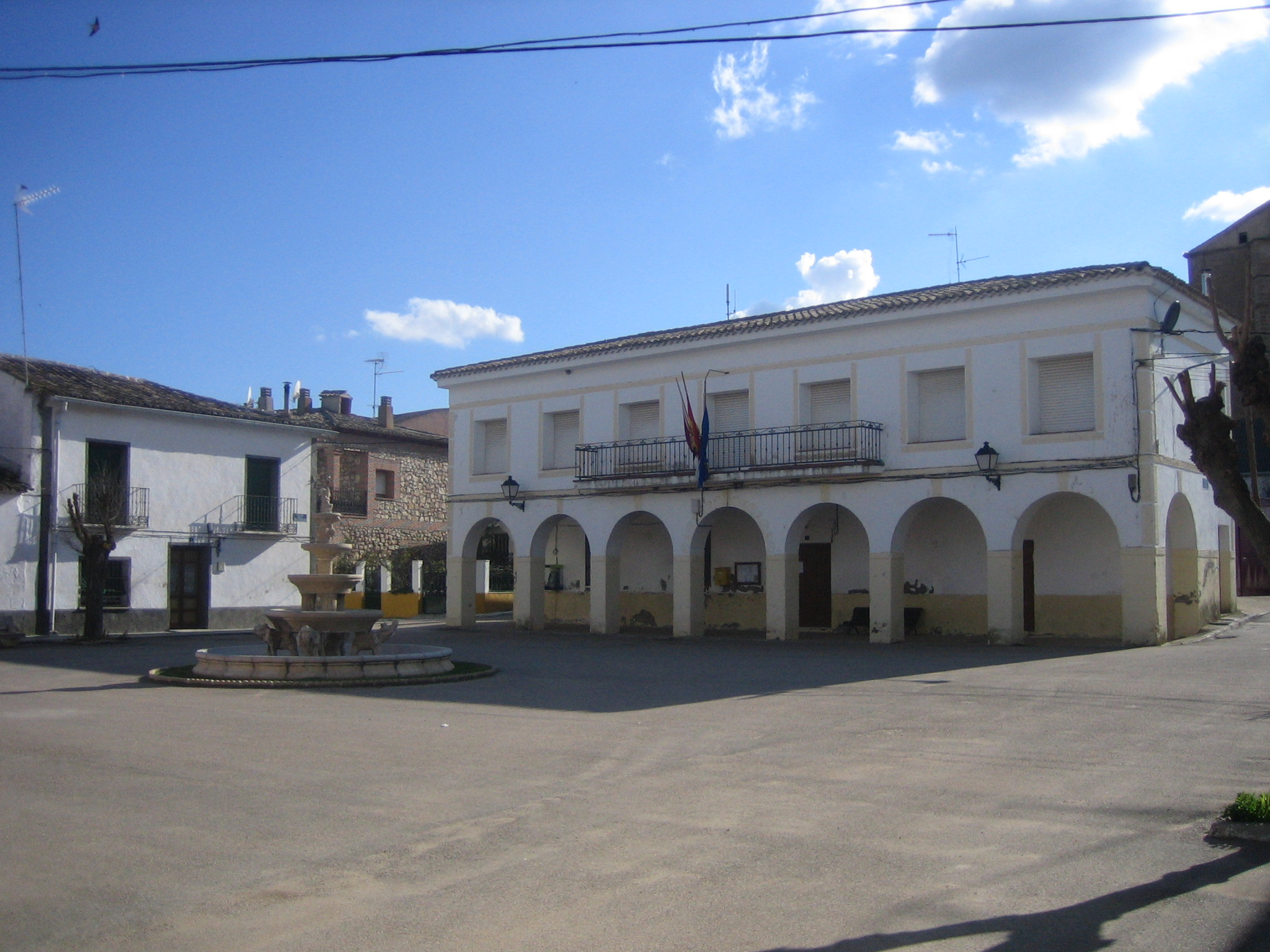

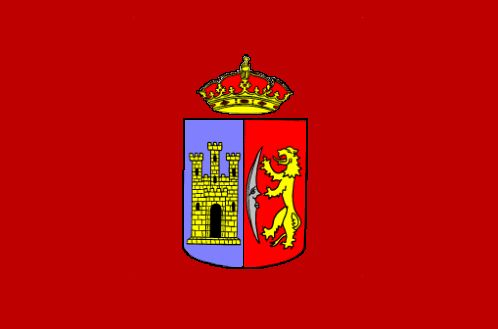
- Flag Coat of arms

- Location within Spain Location within Castilla-La Mancha
- Coordinates: 40°04′N 2°49′W
- Country: Spain
- Autonomous community: Castile-La Mancha
- Province: Cuenca

Population (2025-01-01)
  - Total: 171
- Time zone: UTC+1 (CET)
  - Summer (DST): UTC+2 (CEST)

Alcázar del Rey is a municipality in the province of Cuenca, Castile-La Mancha, Spain. It had a population of 142 as of 2020.
