= Alcazaba (disambiguation) =

Alcazaba may refer to:

== Architecture ==
- A kasbah (Arabic: القصبة; Spanish: alcazaba), a walled-fortification in a city
- Alcazaba of Almería
- Alcazaba of Antequera
- Alcazaba of Badajoz
- Alcazaba of Málaga
- Alcazaba of Mérida
- Alcazaba of the Alhambra

== Geographic locations ==
- Alcazaba (Sierra Nevada), a mountain in Spain
