= List of Open All Hours characters =

This is a list of characters from the BBC situation comedy Open All Hours and its sequel, Still Open All Hours.

== Overview ==
Character	Played by	Series										Appearances		
Character	Played by	Open All Hours				Still Open All Hours						Appearances		
Character	Played by	1	2	3	4	1	2	3	4	5	6	First	Last	Eps
Granville	David Jason											1973	2019	67
Mrs Featherstone	Stephanie Cole											1982	2019	51
Mavis	Maggie Ollerenshaw											1981	2019	48
Leroy	James Baxter											2013	2019	41
Madge	Brigit Forsyth											2013	2019	41
Eric Agnew	Johnny Vegas											2013	2019	40
Gastric	Tim Healy											2014	2019	40
Cyril	Kulvinder Ghir											2013	2019	40
Nurse Gladys Emmanuel	Lynda Baron											1973	2016	39
Kath Agnew	Sally Lindsay											2013	2019	36
Wilburn Newbold	Geoffrey Whitehead											2015	2019	31
Albert Arkwright	Ronnie Barker											1973	1985	26
Mrs Hussein	Nina Wadia											2013	2018	22
Beth	Katie Redford											2017	2019	17
Milk Woman	Barbara Flynn											1981	1985	11
Mrs Rossi	Sue Holderness											2018	2019	10
Mrs Blewett	Kathy Staff											1976	1981	7

== Arkwright's staff ==
=== Albert Arkwright ===
Albert Arkwright
- Open All Hours character
- Portrayed by: Ronnie Barker
- Duration: 1973–85
- First appearance: Pilot: Open All Hours (1973)
- Last appearance: "The Mystical Boudoir of Nurse Gladys Emmanuel" (1985)
- Introduced by: Sir Andrew Watkin (1973); Sydney Lotterby (1976)
In-universe information
- Occupation: Shopkeeper
- Father: Mr Rogers
- Mother: Mrs Rogers
- Stepmother: Unnamed
- Half-sisters: Unnamed (deceased); Lily
- Wife: Kaz Rogers(Wife)
- Uncles: Dudley
- Nephews: Granville; Leroy (great)

Albert E. Arkwright (born 1927) is played by Ronnie Barker in Open All Hours.

Arkwright is a pragmatic, miserly man with old-fashioned values, whose world seems to stop at his shop door, except for his lusting for Nurse Gladys Emmanuel, which prompts him on occasion to wander across the road, usually with a ladder, to gain access to her bedroom window. Arkwright is a devious, and mildly dishonest character, who has many crafty tricks to try to persuade a customer to leave his store having bought at least one thing, and will avoid spending his own money at all cost. He is also very protective of his savings, keeping some in his pocket wrapped in a fine gold chain, and some in an old, battered Oxo tin that he hides under the kitchen sink. This includes, or so he claims, coins from before 1922, when they were "solid silver". He is so protective of his money that the last time he spent a whole night away from the shop was in 1957, when he went to have his appendix removed. The shop's old till possesses a tight spring-clip that regularly puts Arkwright and Granville's fingers in danger. Arkwright refuses to replace it because of the cost of a replacement and because it deters thieves. Although an avid political commentator, he has few political convictions and never sides with either the left or right wing, instead implying they are all useless. Arkwright does however seem fervently opposed to nationalisation, once commenting "My top lip went all stiff and dead, as if it had been nationalised." His political comments usually show no allegiances, instead making remarks like When Wales get home rule, do you think they'll nationalise Clive Jenkins?

Arkwright maintains an openly polite demeanour around customers, but will often insult those who offend him in a veiled or open manner.

Arkwright appears to believe in God, although he is certainly not portrayed as a religious man. Most episodes end with him on the pavement outside the shop during closing time, contemplating the day's events. His thoughts often start with an expression like "Soon they'll only be me and thee that aren't either nationalised or a limited company."

Arkwright, like most characters in the series, is a rational, practical man, who shows no signs of any sentimentality, unlike Granville, who seems to dream away most of his days, and longs for a life away from the shop. Arkwright speaks with a stammer, which he acknowledges sometimes makes it difficult to express himself. He often makes his impediment into a joke, for example asking: Granville, how do you spell P-p-p-pepper? Is it 6 Ps or 7?, Granville occasionally mocks his uncle's speech pattern (such as calling the "weather fore-fore-forecast" the "weather twelvecast", and referring to the "B-B-B-B-B-B-B-B-B-B-BC" as Morse code), although never in a malicious or hurtful manner. Arkwright was shocked on one occasion to find that he also appears to stutter even when thinking to himself.

Ronnie Barker died in 2005 and, by the time of Still Open All Hours, Arkwright has also died and his shop has been bequeathed to Granville as promised, but almost all of his personality traits have passed onto Granville. Granville keeps a framed photograph of Arkwright in the shop's kitchen which he occasionally talks to. Several people in the town, including Granville, believe that Arkwright's ghost still haunts the shop, particularly the cash register, attributing events such as the lights switching on and off or the register randomly opening and closing to him. This is heavily implied to be true in Episode 6 of Series 1, which revolves around Granville's latest scheme under the pretence of holding a séance to contact Arkwright's ghost. Whilst his plan is unsuccessful the final scene sees Granville outside the shop when the lights go out, and they only turn back on after he playfully threatens Arkwright with changing the till if it carries on. The opening of Series 6 episode 5 also sees Granville talking to Arkwright's framed photo which moves in nods and shakes motions into response to him, seemingly of its own accord and without any further explanation.

=== Granville Arkwright ===
Granville
- Open All Hours & Still Open All Hours character
- Portrayed by: David Jason
- Duration: 1973–1985, 2013–2019, 2026
- First appearance: 25 March 1973
- Created by: Roy Clarke
- Introduced by: James Gilbert (1973); Sydney Lotterby (1976); Gareth Edwards (2013)
In-universe information
- Occupation: Errand boy Shopkeeper
- Father: Unknown
- Mother: Unnamed (deceased)
- Sons: Leroy
- Grandfathers: Mr Arkwright
- Grandmothers: Mrs Arkwright
- Uncles: Albert Arkwright; Dudley (great)
- Aunts: Lily

Granville Arkwright (born 1948) is played by David Jason in Open All Hours and its sequel, Still Open All Hours. Granville is an errand boy to his uncle and employer, Albert Arkwright, who is the proprietor of an old-fashioned Yorkshire corner shop.

Granville was born to Arkwright's sister, who died while Granville was a young child, leaving Arkwright as his sole guardian. Granville's father's identity is not known, as his mother is implied to be a woman of loose morals, and Arkwright considers him to have likely been a Hungarian, although he is unsure of this. Raised alone by Arkwright, Granville is often curious and engrossed in thoughts about who his father was and saddened not to have known his mother.

Although a kind provider (as long as it is not too stressful on his wallet), Arkwright's miserly and eccentric personality makes him withdraw Granville from school and he starts helping in his uncle's shop at age eleven. The tedious routine weighs heavily on Granville, who resents getting up well before dawn and not being free until nine o'clock at night. He is poorly paid, at £3 a week (£31.17 in 2023), and is made to pay for anything from the shop shelves, even if Arkwright gave it to him. He is curious and anxious to explore the outside world and mingle with his peers, especially girls. Granville spends most of the day dreaming of being somewhere else or doing something else, a custom which is seen as alien to the other characters. Granville seems fairly sharp and quick witted, and is often quick to make satirical jokes about Arkwright's stammer or mannerisms whilst he will often flippantly make fun at customers to their faces, all of them seemingly being too unintelligent to realise this.

Unlike his uncle who is a practical man, Granville is a carefree man, yet is treated as if he is still a child, despite being well into his adult years. Granville's mundane existence is only brightened up by the milkwoman, the only person other than Arkwright who is awake at the same time as him in the mornings. Despite his attraction to her, she is more worldly wise than he is and likes men of the same calibre as herself, but she is generally sympathetic towards Granville and they have kissed on several occasions.

By the time of Still Open All Hours, Arkwright has died and Granville has inherited the shop as promised by Arkwright, and has a young son, Leroy. Despite their radically different personalities and views on life, however, Granville has become a toned-down version of Arkwright in his old age, such as light-heartedly mocking Leroy over his mother's identity, and attempting to make money out of every customer who walks into the shop, even by telling fibs about certain items such as anchovy paste. At one point, Granville opens a bottle of whisky to pour a drink for a promoter, and then charges him for the whole bottle. As a tribute, Granville keeps a framed portrait of Arkwright in the kitchen. He occasionally speaks to the portrait as if speaking to Arkwright, and continues to affectionately mock his late uncle's stutter. In the first episode of the sixth series of Still Open All Hours Granville is referred to as Mr. Arkwright confirming his surname. Throughout the series, Granville has begun an implied on-again-off-again relationship with Mavis, and he proposes to her in the finale.

=== Leroy ===
Leroy
- Still Open All Hours character
- Portrayed by: James Baxter
- Duration: 2013–2019
- First appearance: 26 December 2013
- Created by: Roy Clarke
- Introduced by: Gareth Edwards
In-universe information
- Occupation: Errand boy
- Father: Granville
- Mother: Linda
- Grandfathers: Unknown
- Grandmothers: Unnamed (deceased)
- Uncles: Albert Arkwright (great); Dudley (great-great)
- Aunts: Lily (great)
- Other relatives: Mrs Arkwright; Mr Arkwright

Leroy is played by James Baxter in Still Open All Hours. Leroy is an errand boy to his father and employer, Granville, who is the proprietor of Arkwright's corner shop from the 2013 series.

== Regular characters ==
=== Nurse Gladys Emmanuel ===
Nurse Gladys Emmanuel
- Open All Hours & Still Open All Hours character
- Portrayed by: Lynda Baron (Sheila Brennan in the Seven of One pilot)
- Duration: 1973–85, 2013–16
- First appearance: 25 March 1973
- Last appearance: 24 January 2016
- Created by: Roy Clarke
- Introduced by: James Gilbert (1973); Sydney Lotterby (1976); Gareth Edwards (2013)
In-universe information
- Occupation: District nurse
- Mother: Unnamed
- Nieces: Unnamed

Nurse Gladys Emmanuel is played by Lynda Baron in Open All Hours and Still Open All Hours.

Gladys is a district nurse (midwife in the first series) who lives opposite the shop with her elderly mother. She is informally engaged to Arkwright but feels unable to go through with the wedding due to caring for her mother. Gladys can be short-tempered with Arkwright due to his miserly ways and mistreatment of Granville, but she does show concern for their welfare.

By the events of Still Open All Hours, Gladys reveals that she and Arkwright did not marry before his death, joking that he died "to save the cost of the church". Gladys did not appear after the second series due to Lynda Baron's other work commitments.

=== Delphine Featherstone ===
Delphine Featherstone
- Open All Hours & Still Open All Hours character
- Portrayed by: Stephanie Cole
- Duration: 1982–85, 2013–2019
- Created by: Roy Clarke
- Introduced by: Sydney Lotterby (1982); Gareth Edwards (2013)

Delphine Featherstone is played by Stephanie Cole in Open All Hours and Still Open All Hours. Known behind her back as "The Black Widow" due to her long black coat and black hat, she openly admires Arkwright's penny-pinching nature.

=== Mavis ===
Mavis
- Open All Hours & Still Open All Hours character
- Portrayed by: Maggie Ollerenshaw
- Duration: 1981–82, 2013–2019
- Created by: Roy Clarke
- Introduced by: Sydney Lotterby (1981); Gareth Edwards (2013)

Mavis is played by Maggie Ollerenshaw in Open All Hours and Still Open All Hours. Known to Arkwright as "wavy Mavis" due to her indecisive nature, it is implied that her marriage is not a happy one. She appears to be good friends with Granville, but wonders if her concern for his welfare is simply an outlet for her maternal instincts. In Still Open All Hours, Mavis is divorced but is frustrated in her and Granville's attempts to date by her overprotective sister Madge.

=== Madge ===
Madge
- Still Open All Hours character
- Portrayed by: Brigit Forsyth
- Duration: 2013–2019
- Created by: Roy Clarke
- Introduced by: Gareth Edwards

Madge is a fictional character played by Brigit Forsyth in the British sitcom Still Open All Hours.

=== Eric Agnew ===
Eric Agnew
- Still Open All Hours character
- Portrayed by: Johnny Vegas
- Duration: 2013–2019
- Created by: Roy Clarke
- Introduced by: Gareth Edwards

Eric Agnew is a fictional character played by Johnny Vegas in the British sitcom Still Open All Hours.

=== Gastric Walter ===
Gastric Walter
- Still Open All Hours character
- Portrayed by: Tim Healy
- Duration: 2014–2019
- Created by: Roy Clarke
- Introduced by: Gareth Edwards

"Gastric" is a fictional character played by Tim Healy in the British sitcom Still Open All Hours.

His surname can be seen written on Granville’s shop window in Series 5.

=== Cyril ===
Cyril
- Still Open All Hours character
- Portrayed by: Kulvinder Ghir
- Duration: 2013–2019
- Created by: Roy Clarke
- Introduced by: Gareth Edwards

Cyril is a fictional character played by Kulvinder Ghir in the British sitcom Still Open All Hours.

== Recurring characters ==
=== Mrs Blewett ===
Mrs Blewett
- Open All Hours character
- Portrayed by: Kathy Staff
- Duration: 1976–1981
- Created by: Roy Clarke
- Introduced by: Sydney Lotterby

Mrs Blewett is a fictional character played by Kathy Staff in the British sitcom Open All Hours. A somewhat dour woman who raised seven children, her personality resembles Staff's character Nora Batty in Roy Clarke's other sitcom Last of the Summer Wine.

=== Milk Woman ===
Milk Woman
- Open All Hours character
- Portrayed by: Barbara Flynn
- Duration: 1981–1985
- Created by: Roy Clarke
- Introduced by: Sydney Lotterby

The Milk Woman is a fictional character played by Barbara Flynn in the British sitcom Open All Hours. Never named in the series, she is the ongoing object of Granville's desire. A divorcee who combines her milk rounds with her Open University studies, she is occasionally receptive to Granville's interests, but makes it clear he's not her only potential suitor and in later episodes she is engaged to another man.

=== Lily Parslow ===
Lily Parslow
- Open All Hours character
- Portrayed by: Frances Cox
- Duration: 1981–1985
- Created by: Roy Clarke
- Introduced by: Sydney Lotterby

Lily Parslow is a fictional character played by Frances Cox in the British sitcom Open All Hours.

=== Kath Agnew ===
Kath Agnew
- Still Open All Hours character
- Portrayed by: Sally Lindsay
- Duration: 2013–2019
- Created by: Roy Clarke
- Introduced by: Gareth Edwards

Kath Agnew is a fictional character played by Sally Lindsay in the British sitcom Still Open All Hours. She is married to Eric Agnew.

=== Mrs Hussein ===
Mrs Hussein
- Still Open All Hours character
- Portrayed by: Nina Wadia
- Duration: 2013–2018
- Created by: Roy Clarke
- Introduced by: Gareth Edwards

Mrs Hussein is a fictional character played by Nina Wadia in the British sitcom Still Open All Hours.

=== Wilburn Newbold ===
Wilburn Newbold
- Still Open All Hours character
- Portrayed by: Geoffrey Whitehead
- Duration: 2015–2019
- Created by: Roy Clarke
- Introduced by: Gareth Edwards

Wilburn Newbold is a fictional character played by Geoffrey Whitehead in the British sitcom Still Open All Hours.
