= Sandra Voe =

Scottish actress (born 1936)

- Born: Alexandra Christie Williamson; 6 October 1936 (age 90); Tingwall, Shetland Islands, Scotland
- Occupation: Actress
- Years active: 1962–present

Sandra Christie Voe (born 6 October 1936) is a Scottish actress of film, television, and theatre.

== Early life and education ==
Sandra Christie Voe was born on 6 October 1936 in the Shetland Islands, Scotland. Her home town is Scalloway.

== Career ==
Her career has included acting in films, television series, and on stage.

=== Television and films ===
Voe began her on screen career in 1966, appearing in an episode of Dr. Finlay's Casebook. She has also appeared in Coronation Street, London's Burning, Taggart, Takin' Over the Asylum, Casualty, Monarch of the Glen, The Bill, Midsomer Murders, and Shetland.

She played Mrs Fraser the shopkeeper in the acclaimed 1983 Scottish film Local Hero. Other film roles included Breaking the Waves (1996), Felicia's Journey, and Vera Drake.

In June 2024, Voe featured in a film commissioned by the Royal National Institute of Blind People, highlighting the need for accessible voting for blind and partially sighted people.

=== Theatre ===
Voe has worked extensively on stage. One of her memorable roles was as the Nurse in Romeo and Juliet with the Royal Shakespeare Company. In 1998, she toured the Shetland Islands with her one-woman play, Christina.

She has worked in many theatres around the UK, including Sheffield Crucible, Leicester Phoenix, Leicester Haymarket, Oxford Playhouse, Birmingham Rep, Manchester Royal Exchange, West Yorkshire Playhouse, Nottingham Playhouse, Bristol Old Vic, Bloomsbury, Hampstead, Lyric Hammersmith, Almeida, Bush, Shared Experience, RNT, Royal Court and Ambassadors.

Her theatre performances include:

- Romeo and Juliet (as the Nurse)
- Mother Courage
- The Nightingale Sang
- The Government Inspector
- Donna Rosita
- Saturday Sunday Monday
- Medea
- The Winter Guest
- A Delicate Balance
- Trouble Sleeping
- Three Sisters
- The Daughter-in-Law
- Marriage
- False Admissions
- Successful Strategies
- The Comedy Without Title
- Landmarks
- The Seagull
- Nana
- Blisters
- The Birthday Party
- The Strangeness of Others
- The Deep Blue Sea
- The Kitchen
- Attempts of her Life
- Henry V
- The Girl With Red Hair
- The Vertical Line

=== Radio ===
Date	Title	Role	Director	Station
28 November 1999	Dianeira		Catherine Bailey and Timberlake Wertenbaker	BBC Radio 4
5 January 2000	A Catapult and a Lady's Spin		David Hunter	BBC Radio 4 Afternoon Play
4 September 2007	The Architects	Emma	Lu Kemp	BBC Radio 4 Afternoon Play
30 September 2007	Babel's Tower			BBC Radio 3 Drama on 3

== Filmography ==
Year	Title	Role	Notes
1966	Dr. Finlay's Casebook	Mrs. Cochran	Episode: "For Services Rendered"
1976	How We Used to Live	Lady Breen-Lowell	Episode: "Blackout"
1978	Within These Walls	Maggie	Episode: "Public Opinion"
1978	Play for Today	Mrs. Bruce	Episode: "Donal and Sally"
1979	Agatha	Therapist	
1979	Flambards	Mrs. Masters	Episode: "New Blood"
1980	Sounding Brass	Mrs. Crowther	Episode: "H.G. and the Exploding Orange"
1980	Coronation Street	Brenda Palin	
1981	Andrina	Tina Stewart	
1981	Bread and Blood	Mrs. Bawcombe	Episodes: "Meat", "Birth", "Childhood" & "Bread"
1981	Screenplay	Headmistress	Episode: "Happy Since I Met You"
1983	Local Hero	Mrs. Fraser	
1983	Play for Today	Miss. Hogg	Episode: "Gates of Gold"
1983	The Ploughman's Lunch	Carmen	
1983	The Nation's Health	Psychologist	Episode: "Collapse"
1984	The Spaver Connection		TV movie
1985	Past Caring	Kath	TV movie
1985	Summer Season		Episode: "Picture Friend"
1985	Open All Hours	Mrs. Bickerdyke	Episodes: "The Housekeeper Caper" & "The Errand Boy Executive"
1986	Comrades	Diana Stanfield	
1986	Screen Two	Helen	Episode: "The Silent Twins"
1986	ScreenPlay		Episode: "Knowing the Score"
1987	Y.E.S.	Ma Venables	
1987	Victoria Wood As Seen On TV	Molly	Episode: #2.7
1988	The Ruth Rendell Mysteries	Mrs. Myrtle Cantrip	Episode: "A Guilty Thing Surprised: Parts One, Two & Three"
1988	The Storyteller	Trollop	Episode: "The True Bride"
1988–1989	London's Burning	Josie's Mum	Episodes: "Christmas Special" (1988), "#2.5" (1989)
1989	Press Gang	Amanda Swanson	Episode: "Photo Finish"
1989	Erik the Viking	Ivar's Mum	
1990	Taggart	Dr. Clyde	Episode: "Hostile Witness"
1990	The Bill	Mrs. Cleghorn	Episodes: "Victims", "Somebody's Husband"
1991	Uncle Vanya	Nanny	TV movie
1992	Love Hurts	Marilyn	Episodes: "Crawling from the Wreckage", "Take it to the Limit", "Cured", "Let's Do It"
1992	The Comic Strip Presents...	Roy's Mother	Episode: "The Crying Game"
1992	Springing Lenin	Mrs. Shillinglaw	TV movie
1992	Salt on Our Skin	Gavin's Mother	other title – Desire
1993	Body & Soul	Peggy	Recurring role: 6 episodes: #1.1, #1.2, #1.3, #1.4, #1.5, #1.6
1993	Naked	Bag Lady	
1994	Look Me in the Eye	Head Teacher	
1994	Takin' Over the Asylum	Evelyn	Episodes: "Fly Like an Eagle", "You Always Hurt the One You Love", "Fool on the Hill", "Let It Be"
1994	Immortal Beloved	Marie Fröhlich	
1995	A Village Affair	Mrs. Finch	TV movie
1995	The Bill	Julia Evans	Episode: "Solid Gold Cert"
1996	The Bare Necessities	Beryl	TV movie
1996	Breaking the Waves	Mother	
1997	The Winter Guest	Chloe	
1997	Casualty	Joyce Lawson	Episode: "The Things We Do for Love"
1997	Holding On	Annie	Recurring role: 7 episodes: #1.1, #1.2, #1.3, #1.4, #1.5, #1.7, #1.8
1999	Station		
1999	Real Women II	Karen's Mother	
1999	Great Expectations	Camilla Pocket	
1999	Felicia's Journey	Jumble Sale Woman	
1999	Janice Beard 45 WPM	Mimi	other title – Janice Beard
2000	The Great Indoors	Christine Gendall	
2000	The Last Musketeer	Peggy Ingrams	TV movie
2000–2002	Playing the Field	Mrs. Powell	Recurring role: 4 episodes: #3.1 (2000), #4.5 (2000), #4.7 (2000), #5.1 (2002)
2002	The Lake	Elizabeth	
2003	Ready When You Are, Mr McGill	Nancy McGill	TV movie
2004	Vera Drake	Vera's Mother	
2004	Verborgen Gebreken	Mrs. Flynt	other title – Hidden Flaws
2004	Foyle's War	Mrs. Roecastle	Episode: "Enemy Fire"
2004	Holby City	Ruth	Episode: "If You Can't Do the Time"
2004	Monarch of the Glen	Proctor MacDonald	Episode: "#6.10"
2006	Wild at Heart	Joan Briggs	Episode: "#1.1"
2006	Eleventh Hour	Mrs. Evans	Episode: "Miracle"
2006	The Bill	Maureen White	Episode: "Brotherly Love"
2006	Midsomer Murders	Lorna Hastings	Episode: "Four Funerals and a Wedding"
2008	Faintheart	Julian's Mum	
2008	Holby City	Elizabeth Mills	Episode: "Mad World"
2009	Shadows in the Sun	Hilary Calder	
2010	Wallander	Betty Laurensson	Episode: "The Man Who Smiled"
2010	Doctors	Alice Vale	Episode: "Alone in the Dark: Parts One & Two"
2010	Holby City	Helen Dover	Episode: "Betrayal"
2012	Blood	Sandra Buleigh	
2013	Shetland	Mima Wilson	Episode: "Red Bones – Part 1"
2013–2014	Holby City	Adrienne McKinnie	Recurring role: 13 episodes
2016	The Coroner	Peggy Winterson	Episode: "The Foxby Affair"
2019	Call the Midwife	Morag Norris	Episode 70: Christmas Special 2019
2026	Falling	Gertrude	
