= List of Still Open All Hours episodes =

The following is a list of episodes for the British sitcom Still Open All Hours, first broadcast on BBC One on 26 December 2013. The series is a sitcom sequel to Open All Hours, which broadcast from 1973 to 1985. There have so far been a total of six series and forty-one episodes, of which one was a 40th Anniversary special and six have been Christmas specials.

== Series overview ==
Series	Episodes	Originally released	
Series	Episodes	First released	Last released
Special		26 December 2013	
1	6	26 December 2014	25 January 2015
2	6	27 December 2015	24 January 2016
3	7	1 January 2017	5 February 2017
4	7	7 January 2018	11 February 2018
5	7	7 October 2018	12 November 2018
6	7	18 October 2019	20 December 2019

== Episode list ==
=== Christmas Special (2013) ===
This episode marked the 40th anniversary of original show, Open All Hours.

No.	Title	Directed by	Written by	Original release date	UK viewers (millions)	Audience%
0	"Still Open All Hours"	Dewi Humphreys	Roy Clarke	26 December 2013	13.07	44.0%
After Arkwright passes away, Granville has become the owner of his shop, aided by his son Leroy from a past fling. Having grown up to be like his uncle, as former nurse Gladys Emmanuel can attest to, Granville works to sell anchovy paste to his customers, while seeking to be with his old girlfriend Mavis and avoiding the clutches of Mrs. Featherstone.

=== Series 1 (2014–15) ===
No.	Title	Directed by	Written by	Original release date	UK viewers (millions)	
1	"St Valentine's Day"	Dewi Humphreys	Roy Clarke	26 December 2014	7.18	26.7%
On St. Valentine's Day, Granville is eager to spend time with Mavis. But her sister Madge doesn't approve of their relationship due to her dislike of men. Eager to overcome this problem, he decides the best course of action is to put the sweet but gullible Gastric, a regular customer, on the path to romancing Madge while taking advantage of the day for making some sales.
2	"Eric the Weather Presenter"	Dewi Humphreys	Roy Clarke	28 December 2014	7.76	28.1%
Granville is determined to tempt the elderly Mr Bentinck into his shop, having never been able to lure him in to spend. At the same time, he is eager to improve Gastric's image, in order to have him make an impression with Madge. Meanwhile, regular customer Eric is eager to convince his wife it will rain, which soon proves unwise.
3	"Granville's Love for Mavis"	Dewi Humphreys	Roy Clarke	4 January 2015	7.16	26.6%
Leroy is embarrassed by using the shop's bike for deliveries. Granville decides to find a replacement, but what he acquires is not what his son desires. Meanwhile, Gastric continues to be led by the shopkeeper into continuing his path towards Madge, while regular customer Cyril is tempted to try out an odd new workout "craze".
4	"The Coffee Shop"	Dewi Humphreys	Roy Clarke	11 January 2015	7.42	27.3%
Leroy is not convinced of Granville's idea to open a coffee shop in the backyard of the shop, especially with the second-hand espresso machine and patio furniture he bought. Meanwhile, a posh customer insults Granville's shop, prompting him to get his own back by selling her something special called "Yaggis", while Eric is forced to endure a visit from his wife Kath's brother.
5	"The Market Idea"	Dewi Humphreys	Roy Clarke	18 January 2015	7.90	30.4%
Granville has bought up the entire stock of a health food shop that recently closed. After a visit from a travelling salesman, he swiftly comes up with an idea to sell the products, using Gastric, a wedding gown, and some clever story-telling. Meanwhile, Leroy is asked for advice on romance by Eric, as he tries to mend bridges with Kath.
6	"The Seance"	Dewi Humphreys	Roy Clarke	25 January 2015	8.58	34.1%
Granville is convinced the shop is being haunted by Arkwright's spirit, and decides to hold a seance attended by some of his regulars. Though Gastric is brought in to help him with his plans to woo Mavis more without Madge's interference. Meanwhile, Leroy's mother turns up out of the blue, eager to check in on Granville and see the son she left with him.

=== Series 2 (2015–16) ===
On 13 September 2015, the BBC confirmed that Still Open All Hours would return for a second series, which began airing in December 2015.

No.	Title	Directed by	Written by	Original release date	UK viewers (millions)	
Special
1	"The Christmas Tree"	Dewi Humphreys	Roy Clarke	26 December 2015	6.02	24.9%
Granville buys himself a Christmas tree for the festive season at a bargain, despite Leroy pointing out its size is a bit of a problem. At the same time, Cyril and Eric decide to embark on a new health fitness regime with a trampoline, which soon gives Granville ideas for how to use it to get Madge convinced to enjoy Gastric's company.
Series
2	"The New Resident"	Dewi Humphreys	Roy Clarke	27 December 2015	5.70	24.4%
After enough problems from Mrs. Featherstone's advances, Granville is delighted when a new resident, Mr. Newbold, becomes a customer for his shop, as he sees them as a suitable means to be rid of her. Meanwhile, Leroy is not convinced a cut-price sale of old stock will work, while Gladys is bit surprised by the return of a former patient she can hardly remember.
3	"The Cherry Picker"	Dewi Humphreys	Roy Clarke	3 January 2016	6.80	26.0%
A customer to the shop causes Granville to discover there is a gap in the shop's security, which prompts him to take measures to plug it. Meanwhile, Gastric has taken a liking to the cooking of a nearby neighbour, prompting Granville to find a way to tempt him back to Madge using a cherry picker and some of Mavis' home cooking.
4	"Double Date"	Dewi Humphreys	Roy Clarke	10 January 2016	7.49	31.0%
Granville is eager to go on a double date with Mavis and Madge, but needs to smarten up Gastric, which soon proves a handful when his only suit gets ruined. Meanwhile, Mrs. Featherstone decides to use Mr. Newbold to help her discreetly woo Granville, while Eric and Cyril find themselves swayed by the shop's newest beauty product - from North Korea.
5	"Kevin's Wedding Day"	Dewi Humphreys	Roy Clarke	17 January 2016	7.37	30.4%
Granville and Leroy find themselves tackling the task of looking after reluctant groom Kevin on his wedding day. Eager for him not to run out on the latest attempt to marry, the pair decide to use a new sunflower display to lock him up to it with handcuffs, but they soon have issues when they forget where the key is when the time of the wedding fast approaches.
6	"The Salami Scheme"	Dewi Humphreys	Roy Clarke	24 January 2016	7.88	33.4%
Granville has his hands full with trying to get rid of some damaged tins of chili beans, prompting some clever tricks to sell them. At the same time, the husband of a female customer turns up in the area, intent on getting a refund from Granville over his Yaggis scheme, only for the shopkeeper to convince him his 'product' works as advertised.

=== Series 3 (2017) ===
On 20 January 2016, David Jason confirmed that Still Open All Hours would return for a third series in December 2016. This is the first series not to feature Lynda Baron's character, Nurse Gladys Emanuel.

No.	Title	Directed by	Written by	Original release date	UK viewers (millions)	
Special
1	"Mrs Featherstone's Christmas Spirit"	Dewi Humphreys	Roy Clarke	26 December 2016	4.14	14.7%
Granville attempts to take advantage of the return of a womanising husband to get rid of some rather hot medicinal pastilles. At the same time, Madge leads efforts to prevent the husband returning to his wife, despite Granville trying to help him. Meanwhile, Kath is determined that the local choir improves to be better than their rivals for this year.
Series
2	"Granville's Helping Hand"	Dewi Humphreys	Roy Clarke	1 January 2017	4.80	18.3%
Granville acquires a new product in the form of a gadget designed to jump start positive emotions in people, which has the desired effect - but in a rather unusual way. Meanwhile, Leroy takes a fancy to a new female customer, while Mrs. Featherstone seeks assistance in dealing with an unsightly problem from Mr. Newbold's underwear.
3	"When the Adventure Strikes For Eric Cyril and Mr Newbold"	Dewi Humphreys	Roy Clarke	8 January 2017	5.29	19.8%
Granville sell some old mints, which have an unnatural side effect of turning people's tongue green, by convincing customers it can help them find their "Wambo". Meanwhile, Eric and Cyril seek some way of impressing their wives, and group up with Mr. Newbold to give themselves a new adventuring image, which doesn't work out too well.
4	"Gastric and the Spiritual Powers"	Dewi Humphreys	Roy Clarke	15 January 2017	5.02	19.2%
Granville attempts to get rid of some leftover Christmas puddings in stock, by offering them up as a high energy food as well as a romantic aid. Meanwhile, Madge is convinced that her house is haunted, giving Granville an opportunity to see if Gastric can impress her with spiritual powers he seems to possess.
5	"The Big Cheese"	Dewi Humphreys	Roy Clarke	22 January 2017	6.56	27.3%
A big wheel of cheese is stinking out Arkwright's storeroom from its old age, so Granville is determined to sell it, even if he must disguise what he is selling to his customers. At the same time, Leroy finally convinces his father to get them a van, but the choices offered by Gastric are not ideal, especially when his father seeks something within a tight-wad budget.
6	"Mr Newbold's Homemade Wine"	Dewi Humphreys	Roy Clarke	29 January 2017	6.94	29.4%
Granville attempts to off-load a load of turnips on his customers, by marketing them with amazing medicinal qualities, including as a means to keep away the "smidges". Meanwhile, Eric attempts to find out why a woman is seeking him out, and Mrs. Featherstone takes a keen liking to the homemade wine of Mr. Newbold's sister.
7	"Online Shopping"	Dewi Humphreys	Roy Clarke	5 February 2017	7.23	29.8%
To take advantage of online shopping, Arkwright's is turned into a delivery point for online sales. At the same time, Madge decides to sulk in her bedroom, giving Granville an opportunity to further Gastric's relationship with her, using a giant stuffed mouse. Meanwhile, Eric seeks advice from Leroy when he is found to have been in possession of a woman's stocking.

=== Series 4 (2018) ===
On 14 January 2017, David Jason revealed that he will be returning to film more episodes towards the end of 2017.

No.	Title	Directed by	Written by	Original release date	UK viewers (millions)	
Special
1	"Granville's Christmas Wish with Mavis"	Dewi Humphreys	Roy Clarke	28 December 2017	4.11	16.8%
It's Christmas in the corner shop, but some of Granville's most important customers have plans to leave town. Not only is Madge planning to take his beloved Mavis away for a Christmas break but is Mr Newbold also thinking of doing a runner, leaving Granville at the mercy of Mrs Featherstone's amorous advances? Granville has to use some of his craftiest wiles to persuade everyone not to travel. After all, as well as wanting to stay close to Mavis, he's got to shift a large number of distinctly wonky Christmas Crackers.This episode was recorded on 6 October 2017.
Series
2	"The Fitness Class"	Dewi Humphreys	Roy Clarke	7 January 2018	5.00	20.1%
Granville has a new idea for growing the business: he's offering fitness classes. But can he really turn Gastric into a greyhound, and is that the right way to Madge's flinty heart? At the other end of the scale, Mr Newbold believes he has hit on the perfect way to repel the attentions Mrs Featherstone – all he needs is a completely new image. But do even worse perils than the Black Widow lie in wait for the new look ‘Pit Bull’ Newbold? This episode was recorded on 13 October 2017.
3	"Eric and Cyril's Tandem"	Dewi Humphreys	Roy Clarke	14 January 2018	4.98	TBA
Mr Newbold has decided to barricade his house against Mrs Featherstone, but Granville is sure he wouldn't be so keen to avoid her if he knew all about her hidden exotic past. Meanwhile, a lycra-clad Eric and Cyril push the envelope of masculinity on their new tandem, Mavis takes Granville up on his offer of a tour of his Victorian cheese-slicer collection, and Leroy tries to make the most of having to dress up as a banana for business reasons.This episode was recorded on 20 October 2017.
4	"Rembrandt Di Gastric"	Dewi Humphreys	Roy Clarke	21 January 2018	5.35	TBA
Granville encourages Gastric to express his artistic side in a local art competition, but he throws himself into self-expression more enthusiastically than anyone could have predicted. Meanwhile Granville has bought a large collection of mystery tins. Unfortunately Leroy and Granville are still none the wiser on the contents after they've opened one. Now they face the ultimate challenge - how can you sell something when you have absolutely no idea what it is? This episode was recorded on 3 November 2017.
5	"The Lunch Offer"	Dewi Humphreys	Roy Clarke	28 January 2018	5.60	TBA
Madge is thinking of leaving the area and telling Mavis she has to go with her, so Granville has to come up with a reason to keep the woman of his dreams from moving away. There's also a little problem of how to shift a load of jars of crabapple jelly so sour it could strip teeth. To make matters worse, Granville's best customers Eric and Cyril have taken a vow against ever being conned again. Meanwhile, Mrs Featherstone has made Mr Newbold a lunch offer he can't refuse.This episode was recorded on 10 November 2017.
6	"Beth and Leroy's Romance"	Dewi Humphreys	Roy Clarke	4 February 2018	5.28	TBA
Madge and Mavis are leaving the area. Granville sets up a big night out in a restaurant so he and Gastric can persuade them to stay. The only problem is his money belt seems to be tightening every time anyone looks at the menu. Meanwhile, Leroy's romance with Beth finally seems to be getting somewhere, but the time has come to introduce her to his father. And Granville has come up with the perfect way for Eric and Cyril to get their wives' attention: rumours that they have been seen out and about with another woman.This episode was recorded on 17 November 2017.
7	"Lunch in a Seaside Town Hotel"	Dewi Humphreys	Roy Clarke	11 February 2018	5.54	TBA
A trip to Scarborough presents Granville with an opportunity to combine business with pleasure as Mavis invites him for lunch in a seaside hotel. But can Granville get a moment alone with her without Madge? And can he manage to stop thinking about what is going on in the shop for long enough to let romance blossom? Back in Arkwright's, Leroy is in charge for the day. He is young. He is keen. He is full of confidence. What could possibly go wrong? And why is there a customer out cold in the middle of the floor?This episode was recorded on 23 November 2017.

=== Series 5 (2018) ===
In January 2018, it was revealed the show will return for a fifth series late 2018.

No.	Title	Directed by	Written by	Original release date	UK viewers (millions)	
Series
1	"Eric's Camping Dream"	Dewi Humphreys	Roy Clarke	7 October 2018	4.62	TBA
Granville tries to sell bargain spectacles that do nothing for his customers' eyesight, while Mr Newbold is inspired to take control of his life by a self-help book and resolves to tell Mrs Featherstone how he really feels about her. Eric tries to persuade Kath to join him on a camping holiday, and Leroy receives a mysterious package.
2	"Boosting Sales"	Dewi Humphreys	Roy Clarke	14 October 2018	4.52	TBA
Granville meets a man who claims to have been repeatedly abducted by aliens, and tries to persuade him to use his stories to boost sales. Leroy gets involved in a love triangle when Beth turns up for their date with a friend, while a divorcee comes to the shop hoping to find something that will stop her from missing her husband.
3	"The Sausage Machine"	Dewi Humphreys	Roy Clarke	21 October 2018	4.09	TBA
Granville buys a second-hand sausage machine and produces Arkwright's designer sausages with some interesting results. The Black Widow is still keeping her options open in the pursuit of her next husband but decides that she needs to get tongues wagging by asking Mr Newbold to fly some racy underwear on his washing line.
4	"An Errand Boy by the Footprint"	Dewi Humphreys	Roy Clarke	28 October 2018	4.87	TBA
Granville decides that he needs to increase his advertising footprint, but then his grand scheme, in the shape of an oversized balloon, wreaks havoc. Beth is still on at Leroy to find a date for her friend Ruby, and Arkwright's shop continues to offer more unlikely products when Granville uses his best sales pitch to sell some tinned smoked oysters with the promise of the wow factor to his customers.
5	"Call in the Admirers"	Dewi Humphreys	Roy Clarke	4 November 2018	4.88	TBA
Granville surprises Kath when she pops in for her regular loaf of bread when he claims to have a special way of matching the right product with the customer. Madge and Mavis are off to a wedding looking very glamorous, and Granville gets concerned that Mavis might stay for the disco and attract new admirers, especially when Gastric recounts the story of how his cousin Maureen met her husband at a wedding.
6	"Tour de Yorkshire"	Dewi Humphreys	Roy Clarke	12 November 2018	3.60	TBA
It's a day full of bad surprises for Granville when the till becomes unwell, Leroy buys an ice cream van and the Black Widow finds him overheating in a tight spot. Eric and Cyril decide it's time to show some macho spirit and get back in the saddle - after all, this is the home of the Tour de Yorkshire!
Special
7	"Gastric's Christmas Meal"	Dewi Humphreys	Roy Clarke	23 December 2018	3.89	TBA
It is Christmas, and Granville has a large consignment of mistletoe mince pies to shift, but how can he persuade his regulars to buy them? Eric and Cyril refuse to be taken in by the wily grocer's promises of romantic enhancement in every box - but could the pies actually work? The Black Widow decides she is taking Mr Newbold Christmas shopping, Madge and Mavis discuss whether to invite Gastric for Christmas dinner, and Leroy tries to enlist Ruby's help to stop Beth seeing Gerald. Back in the Community Hall, everyone gets in the festive spirit by arranging a surprise anniversary party for Annie and George Thompson.

=== Series 6 (2019) ===
In December 2018, it was revealed the show will return for a sixth series late 2019. Episodes 5 and 6 were originally scheduled for 22 and 29 November 2019 respectively, but were delayed due to the 2019 General Election broadcasts.

No.	Title	Directed by	Written by	Original release date	UK viewers (millions)	
Series
1	"The Art of Romance"	Dewi Humphreys	Roy Clarke	18 October 2019	3.76	TBA
Arkwright's protege finds an old mangle in the yard - and wonders how he can best put it to use. Meanwhile, Beth continues to pressure Leroy to find a date for her best friend, Ruby, who has been suspended at work. Elsewhere, Eric and Cyril tutor Mr Newbold in the art of romance - and how to get closer to Mrs Rossi.
2	"Catering"	Dewi Humphreys	Roy Clarke	25 October 2019	3.87	TBA
Granville's plans to open a new Arkwrights’ catering arm, offering his customers tasty toasties, doesn't quite go according to plan when his reconditioned toaster blows a fuse. Mr Newbold gets a little bolder in his pursuit of Mrs Rossi whilst trying to avoid the Black Widow. Leroy and Willis meet up with Beth and Ruby with a view to going on a date, but Willis is worried that Ruby's not right for him, and at Madge and Mavis's the Black Widow decides it's time for a makeover, but how far will she go?
3	"Mrs Featherstone's Driving Lesson"	Dewi Humphreys	Roy Clarke	1 November 2019	3.80	TBA
Granville is selling 'lucky' toy sloths from Madagascar, but will that help the Black Widow, who has decided it's time to learn to drive, if only she can find an instructor prepared to give her more than one lesson? Kath and the ladies are organising a bring and buy sale for charity, but Eric is less than happy when he discovers that Kath is planning to put his favourite clothes on her stall. Meanwhile, Willis finally gets away from his mother to go on a date with Ruby, and is romance blossoming for Madge and Gastric?
4	"Eric Finally Goes Camping"	Dewi Humphreys	Roy Clarke	8 November 2019	3.78	TBA
Romance is in the air. Granville encourages Gastric to become a fearless hunter in an effort to impress Madge and get closer to her. Mavis senses the Black Widow making a move on Granville and decides to stand up for herself for once, and Mr Newbold goes to the library in the hope of meeting up with Mrs Rossi. Meanwhile, Eric and Cyril finally get their wives to go camping, but who is going to help with the washing up?
5	"Hobbies and Pastimes"	Dewi Humphreys	Roy Clarke	29 November 2019	3.53	TBA
Granville creates a special blend of snuff, but will his customers notice any beneficial effects? Ruby tells Willis that she is going to take him to the gym for some intensive training. Madge thinks Gastric needs to lose weight, and Mr Newbold thinks he has found a pastime to share with Mrs Rossi - away from the prying eyes of Mrs Featherstone. However, a determined Black Widow enlists assistance from Granville and Leroy for a crash course in how to ride a bicycle.
6	"The Spanish Consignment"	Dewi Humphreys	Roy Clarke	20 December 2019	3.39	TBA
Gastric spends the night at Madge's house, but has he found the path to her best bedroom? Granville takes delivery of a bargain consignment from Spain, not knowing exactly what is in the very large crate. Eric and Cyril have a fall out over a lost compass, while Mr Newbold falls in and gets a soaking on a boat trip with Mrs Rossi. The canny grocer has his work cut out getting friends to make up and getting a wet customer home without being spotted by "Black Widow" Mrs Featherstone.
Special
7	"The Magic of Christmas"	Dewi Humphreys	Roy Clarke	23 December 2019	3.87	TBA
Granville tries to put the magic back into Christmas but things don't always go according to plan and people keep disappearing - although the nations' favourite grocer might have one last trick he can perform successfully, if he can find a glamorous assistant. Eric and Cyril try to persuade their wives to try Arkwrights' special French custard and Mr Newbold 'accidentally' bumps into Mrs Rossi at the café and she invites him to Christmas lunch, but will the Black Widow throw the book at him when she finds out?
