= List of Open All Hours episodes =

This is a list of the episodes of Open All Hours, a BBC sitcom created and written by Roy Clarke. Open All Hours stars Ronnie Barker and David Jason as an uncle and nephew who operate a small grocery shop in Doncaster, South Yorkshire. The programme was introduced to television in 1973, as an episode of Seven of One, an anthology series that tested seven television pilots with Barker in the lead role.

The first series of Open All Hours premiered in 1976 on BBC2. The programme returned to television in 1981, this time on BBC1. The final two series also aired on BBC1, in 1982 and 1985 respectively. In all, 25 episodes were broadcast after the pilot, plus a comedy sketch that appeared in a 1982 Christmas special called The Funny Side of Christmas.

The pilot episode was directed by James Gilbert, and all subsequent episodes were directed by Sydney Lotterby. Ronnie Barker died in 2005, but in 2013 a sequel titled Still Open All Hours launched on BBC One. Roy Clarke writes the new series, with Dewi Humphreys directing. David Jason reprises his role as Granville, now in charge of the shop.

== Series overview ==
Series
Series	Episodes	Originally released	
Series	Episodes	First released	Last released
1	6	20 February 1976	26 March 1976
2	7	1 March 1981	19 April 1981
3	6	21 March 1982	25 April 1982
4	6	1 September 1985	6 October 1985

== Episodes ==
=== Pilot (1973) ===
The Open All Hours pilot was the first episode of Ronnie Barker's 1973 comedy anthology series, Seven of One. It was one of two episodes that the BBC developed into a series; the other, Prisoner and Escort, became the BBC1 sitcom Porridge, which premiered in 1974. The first series of Open All Hours began on BBC2 in 1976.

The exterior shots in the main series were filmed at a different location than in the pilot: The corner of Lister Avenue and Scarth Avenue in Doncaster.

No.	Title	Directed by	Written by	Original release date
0	"Open All Hours"	James Gilbert	Roy Clarke	25 March 1973
Arkwright hears that Gladys Emmanuel has another man. ("Couldn't you clasp me to your bosom?") Granville wants a van to meet ladies. Featuring: Yootha Joyce (Mrs Scully), Keith Chegwin (customer), Sheila Brennan (Nurse Gladys Emmanuel), David Valla (bread man)

=== Series 1 (1976) ===
No. overall	No. in series	Title	Directed by	Written by	Original release date	Running time
1	1	"Full of Mysterious Promise"	Sydney Lotterby	Roy Clarke	20 February 1976	28:45
When not in pursuit of Gladys Emanuel, the district nurse who lives opposite the shop, Arkwright is forever on the lookout to save money, such as buying a stock of fire-damaged tinned food. Unfortunately, the damage means that all the labels have come off, so nobody knows exactly what is in the tins. Lynda Baron replaced Sheila Brennan as Gladys Emanuel, a role she played throughout the series and the first two series of the sequel Still Open All Hours.
2	2	"A Mattress on Wheels"	Sydney Lotterby	Roy Clarke	27 February 1976	29:23
Fed up with having to do deliveries for the shop in all weathers on his bike, Granville suggests that Arkwright invests in a van, but Arkwright has always been dead against getting a van. When Granville points out the advantages of taking a lady friend for a drive, Arkwright still balks at the expense, but it could be a means of impressing Nurse Gladys. So, Arkwright buys a second hand one and Granville wishes he had not when he takes it out on the road.
3	3	"A Nice Cosy Little Disease"	Sydney Lotterby	Roy Clarke	5 March 1976	30:05
Arkwright feels that Nurse Gladys has been neglecting him and, in order to get her undivided attention, he must come down with a "disease"; nothing too serious, but enough to have her lavishing attention on him. However, Gladys sees through the ruse and is ready to beat him at his own game.
4	4	"Beware of the Dog"	Sydney Lotterby	Roy Clarke	12 March 1976	28:36
A crime wave scares an already security-obsessed Arkwright, who decides the shop has to be fortified. Arkwright decides to scare off any potential burglars by putting up a notice that says "Beware of the Dog" but, since everybody knows that he has no dog, he goes out to borrow one for the weekend from the local kennels. However, the dog is better at scaring off customers than burglars.
5	5	"Well Catered Funeral"	Sydney Lotterby	Roy Clarke	19 March 1976	29:58
Arkwright goes with Nurse Gladys to the funeral of his friend Parsloe. He is not keen to leave Granville in charge but it does afford the opportunity to get rid of some unwanted bakery products for the wake. Having rung the shop constantly to ensure that Granville has got things under control, he later tells him he should get out more, as this will give Arkwright more opportunities with Nurse Gladys. But his best friend's funeral tests Arkwright's generosity.
6	6	"Apples and Self Service"	Sydney Lotterby	Roy Clarke	26 March 1976	29:55
Arkwright has bought too many apples and desperately tries in vain to persuade each successive customer to buy some. After raising eyebrows around town after finding a pair of shop window dummy's legs, Granville tells his uncle he should adopt the personal touch in his sales methods. Arkwright, however, plumps for self-service and then suspects everyone of trying to shoplift.

=== Series 2 (1981) ===
No. overall	No. in series	Title	Directed by	Written by	Original release date	Running time
7	1	"Laundry Blues"	Sydney Lotterby	Roy Clarke	1 March 1981	30 minutes
Nurse Gladys feels sorry for Granville, struggling to do the laundry by hand, and suggests to Arkwright that he buys a washing machine. Arkwright wants to keep the affections of Gladys but does not want to spend too much money, so he makes sure she sees a brand-new machine being delivered - which is then taken straight out the back and replaced by an old second hand one. Exposure follows, especially when an ill-tempered VAT man comes to the shop. NB: A mistake was left in the episode as the picture of a topless woman can be seen when Granville is looking in the motor accessory shop window display.
8	2	"The Reluctant Traveller"	Sydney Lotterby	Roy Clarke	8 March 1981	30 minutes
Arkwright decides to take Nurse Gladys away to a hotel. This leaves Granville in a position to make his play for the milkwoman, but Arkwright, hands on as ever and never keen to be too far away from the shop, has booked himself and Nurse Gladys into a hotel just round the corner - but Arkwright still refuses to part with his precious money, and resorts to an overtight money belt, which makes it uncomfortable for him to walk.
9	3	"Fig Biscuits and Inspirational Toilet Rolls"	Sydney Lotterby	Roy Clarke	15 March 1981	30 minutes
Arkwright's marketing genius comes to the fore as he tries to shift some surplus stock. Whilst Granville moans about the shop opening at dawn Arkwright bewails his inability to sell a load of fig biscuits and toilet rolls imprinted with inspirational texts. The opportunity arises when regular customer Mavis mistakes the sepulchral voice of Granville in the cellar for a ghost advising her what to buy, but sadly for Arkwright he falls through the open trap door and injures his leg.
10	4	"The New Suit"	Sydney Lotterby	Roy Clarke	22 March 1981	30 minutes
Nurse Gladys has forced Arkwright to buy a new suit because she is tired of being seen around with him in a shabby suit.
11	5	"Arkwright's Mobile Store"	Sydney Lotterby	Roy Clarke	29 March 1981	30 minutes
Arkwright has plans to expand the business and begins by buying an old ice cream van. All of this in order to convince Nurse Gladys that he is a man of enterprise. The mobile shop is to be driven around by Granville, but given Arkwright's customary meanness, the best that he can come up with is the clapped-out ice cream van, leading to Granville having a close encounter with some perishables.
12	6	"Shedding at the Wedding"	Sydney Lotterby	Roy Clarke	5 April 1981	30 minutes
To the envy of Granville, who has never attended one, Arkwright is taking Nurse Gladys to her niece's wedding and has taken his old suit out of mothballs, but it still reeks of camphor. Nurse Gladys makes him hang it out of the car window as they drive along but the trousers end up under a tractor's wheels.
13	7	"St Albert's Day"	Sydney Lotterby	Roy Clarke	19 April 1981	30 minutes
Arkwright has always told Granville his father was a Hungarian, but then a real Hungarian comes into the shop. Arkwright is curious but is more concerned that he may be a shoplifter, and hits on a cunning plan to part him from his jacket so that he can search the pockets for evidence. To do so, he invents the fictional St Albert's Day.

=== Series 3 (1982) ===
No. overall	No. in series	Title	Directed by	Written by	Original release date	Running time
14	1	"An Errand Boy by the Ear"	Sydney Lotterby	Roy Clarke	21 March 1982	30 minutes
There are protests when Arkwright is caught dragging Granville around by his ear. Arkwright is baffled when his customers get upset with his treatment of Granville and reasons that this is what errand boys are for, but the customers choose to differ and force Arkwright to improve his nephew's lot in life - which proves to be a struggle for the tight shopkeeper.
15	2	"The Ginger Men"	Sydney Lotterby	Roy Clarke	28 March 1982	30 minutes
When Arkwright finds himself with a surplus of Jamaican ginger cakes, he tries various marketing ploys in order to sell them off but hits the jackpot when he claims that the cakes contain drugs, which has the customers fighting to get at them.
16	3	"Duet for Solo Bicycle"	Sydney Lotterby	Roy Clarke	4 April 1982	30 minutes
When a smartly dressed man comes to the shop asking for directions, Arkwright is concerned that the love of his life is seeing another man, whilst Granville's love life is also suffering. It is bad enough that when he goes with Wendy, he only has a bike with which to impress her, but the bike has a squeak, which he cannot get rid of and it is driving Granville round the bend.
17	4	"How to Ignite Your Errand Boy..."	Sydney Lotterby	Roy Clarke	11 April 1982	30 minutes
Arkwright considers yet another money-making scheme for his local shoppers to escape. Everybody seems to want firelighters in the winter, so he can save cash by making his own, or rather getting Granville to make them in the shed at the back. But Arkwright's plan to make his own firelighters has a snag, they may be somewhat dangerous to make.
18	5	"The Man from Down Under"	Sydney Lotterby	Roy Clarke	18 April 1982	30 minutes
When one of Nurse Gladys Emmanuel's admirers returns from Australia, Arkwright proffers a real Yorkshire welcome. Arkwright learns that a former beau of Nurse Gladys is returning from Australia, where he emigrated a couple of decades ago to make his fortune. Naturally Arkwright is not happy to think that Nurse Gladys might be tempted by her old flame and sets about to take drastic action with the man he believes to be his rival.
19	6	"The Cool Cocoa Tin Lid"	Sydney Lotterby	Roy Clarke	25 April 1982	30 minutes
Fed up with always wearing tank tops and shop pinnies, Granville decides to court a cool image. He has got the open-necked shirt and the shades, no medallion, until a cocoa tin lid suffices.

=== Christmas special (1982) ===
This eight-minute short subject was broadcast as a segment of a 1982 Christmas special called The Funny Side of Christmas. One of the other segments of the programme was devoted to a comedy sketch for Only Fools and Horses, another sitcom in which David Jason co-stars.

Title	Directed by	Written by	Original release date	Running time
"Open All Seasons"	Sydney Lotterby	Roy Clarke	27 December 1982	10 minutes
On Christmas morning, Granville is looking forward to dinner at Nurse Gladys', but Arkwright is annoyed that her mother is still alive. Granville also reveals he is having tea later with the newly separated "Wavy Mavis". In the typical closing thought, Arkwright bemoans the fact that Jesus was born on a bank holiday, resulting in his having to close the shop.

=== Series 4 (1985) ===
No. overall	No. in series	Title	Directed by	Written by	Original release date	Running time
20	1	"Soulmate Wanted"	Sydney Lotterby	Roy Clarke	1 September 1985	30 minutes
Granville is desperate for female company and decides it is time he did something about his single status, so he places an advert in the lonely hearts column of a magazine. He gets a result, but he feels he must lie about himself to the girl in question and presents himself as a yuppie. Of course, Arkwright will go and ruin it for him.
21	2	"Horse-Trading"	Sydney Lotterby	Roy Clarke	8 September 1985	30 minutes
Arkwright has a rival corner shop owner, Mr. Gupta, so he sends Granville undercover, in a sari, to check him out. Arkwright believes he can get one over on his rival by selling him a load of "genuine Yorkshire clothes horses", but he has reckoned without Gupta's business skills, and offloads the clothes horses on the local shopkeeper with unexpected results.
22	3	"The Housekeeper Caper"	Sydney Lotterby	Roy Clarke	15 September 1985	30 minutes
Arkwright advertises for a live-in housekeeper. Arkwright believes that he can make Nurse Gladys jealous if he has a live-in housekeeper, so he places the advert. Unfortunately, this only succeeds in attracting the attention of the formidable Black Widow, Mrs. Featherstone. Nurse Gladys is not jealous, and Granville is certainly not happy with the unfolding situation, and nor is Arkwright.
23	4	"The Errand Boy Executive"	Sydney Lotterby	Roy Clarke	22 September 1985	30 minutes
Stephanie, a young lady from the boutique, has caught Granville's eye. Anxious to impress Stephanie, he passes himself off as a young executive, claiming that Arkwright is his "faithful old assistant". Arkwright is less than happy with this idea and goes about trying to set things straight, even if it means ruining Granville's chances.
24	5	"Happy Birthday, Arkwright!"	Sydney Lotterby	Roy Clarke	29 September 1985	30 minutes
Arkwright's birthday is approaching, as is a potential visit from the Good Shop Guide. Nurse Gladys plays a trick on Arkwright, helped by Granville. They persuade the shopkeeper that a man representing the Good Shopkeepers' Guide is in the area, awarding bonuses to shops whose staff show extra courtesy. She then dresses as a male shop inspector and visits Arkwright's shop, where she is greeted with unusual civility.
25	6	"The Mystical Boudoir of Nurse Gladys Emmanuel"	Sydney Lotterby	Roy Clarke	6 October 1985	30 minutes
Arkwright will do anything to get himself into Nurse Gladys Emmanuel's bedroom, including the use of a ladder and a box of chocolates. Meanwhile, Granville takes to wearing tights on his head. Arkwright has a cunning plan to use Granville to impersonate a burglar, wearing his stocking mask to scare Nurse Gladys so that Arkwright can come running to the rescue in her bedroom. Granville is sick of trapping his hand in the dangerous old till and wants his uncle to buy a new one.

== See also ==
- List of Still Open All Hours episodes
