= Taj Atwal =

Actress

- Born: Norwich, England
- Education: York College; Guildford School of Acting (BA)
- Occupation: Actress
- Years active: 2012–present

Taj Atwal is an English actress from Norwich, who has appeared in Stella, In the Club, Line of Duty, The Syndicate and Hullraisers.

== Biography ==
Atwal was born on 1 December 1987 in Norwich to an Indian family. After her mother lost her job at the Rowntree's factory in Norwich and was offered a job in York, Atwal moved there with her mother when aged about seven. Living in Haxby, Atwal participated in stage productions at Easingwold School. She had to leave her home aged 16, and lived with volunteers from the homeless charity SASH (Safe and Sound Homes) for two years, and attended York College from 2004 to 2007, obtaining distinctions in both a National Award in Dance and a National Diploma qualification in Performing Arts (Acting). For her graduate production, she played Anitra in Peer Gynt. Having gained funding through Dance and Drama Awards, she then became a student at Guildford School of Acting.

In 2013 she played Amani Sarin, a teacher who suffers alopecia due to stress and then lies that she has cancer, in an episode of the anthology series Moving On. Later roles include Jasminder in Stella, Jasmin in In the Club, and PC Tatleen Sohota in the fifth series of Line of Duty (2019). She chose to join the cast of The Syndicate rather than continue in Line of Duty.

Her stage roles include Meenah in East Is East (2014–2015), and Rita in a 2018 production of Rita, Sue and Bob Too. Atwal is an ambassador for Children's Air Ambulance. In 2020 she became a patron of Theatre@41 in York.

== Filmography ==
=== Film ===
Year	Film	Role	Notes
2014	Puja Nughts	Priya Shah	Short film
2015	A.K.A Nadia	Fayza	
2018	Death on the Tyne	Tracy	Television film
2020	Muse	Kay	Short film
2021	The Protégé	Seema	
2022	Do This for Me	Beca	Short film
2022	Memory	Linda Amistead	
2022	What's Love Got to Do with It?	Sumaira	
2022	Christmas Carole	Bobbie	Television film

=== Television ===
Year	Title	Role	Notes	Ref.
2012	In with the Flynns	Megan	Episode: "The Tandyman"	
2012	Miranda	Emma	Episode: "It Was Panning"	
2012–2016	Stella	Jasminder Choudary	Recurring role	
2013	Love Matters	Uzma	Episode: "Kitten Chic"	
2013	Moving On	Amani Sarin	Episode: "The Value"	
2014–2016	In the Club	Jasmin Sidhwa	Series regular	
2015–2016	Thunderbirds Are Go	Madeline Lemaire	3 episodes, voice role	
2016	The Break		Episode: "Breaking the Code"	
2017	No Offence	Tulip Panesar	1 episode	
2018	This World	Nusba	Episode: "Murdered for Love? Samia Shahid"	
2019	Pitching In	Reshma	Series regular	
2019	Line of Duty	PC Tatleen Sohota	Recurring role	
2019	Cold Call	Hana	Series regular	
2019	The Diary of My Broken Vagina	Laura		
2020	Van der Valk	Aamina/Zafira Jabara	Episode: "Only in Amsterdam"	
2020	Truth Seekers	Elara	Recurring role	
2021	The Syndicate	Roxy Varma	Series regular	
2022, 2023	Hullraisers	Rana	Series regular	
2022	The Control Room	Leigh	Mini-series	
2022	Trying	Maya	Recurring role	
2024	Death in Paradise	Zoe Ainsworth	Season 13 (E5-6). 2 episodes	
2024	Too Good to Be True	Jasmine	Mini-series	
2024–present	Daddy Issues	Cherry	10 episodes	
2025	Riot Women	Nisha	Series regular	

=== Theatre ===
Dates	Title	Role	Venue	Ref.
2014–2015	East is East	Meenah	Trafalgar Studios and tour	
2016	Educating Rita	Rita	Hull Truck Theatre	
2018	Rita, Sue and Bob Too	Rita	Royal Court Theatre	
2021	Maryland	Fury	Royal Court Theatre	

=== Video games ===
Year	Series	Role	Notes	Ref.
2026	Overwatch 2	Domina		

== Awards and nominations ==
Year	Association	Category	Title	Result	Ref.
2023	British Academy Television Awards	Best Female Comedy Performance	Hullraisers	Nominated	
