= The Practice (1985 TV series) =

1985 British television soap opera

- Country of origin: United Kingdom
- No. of series: 2
- No. of episodes: 47

Original release
- Network: ITV
- Release: 18 January 1985 – 15 August 1986

The Practice is a 1985 British television soap opera produced for ITV by Granada Television, which aired for two series in 1985 and 1986. The series was first introduced as a twice-weekly medical drama in January 1985, becoming Granada's second regular networked soap opera along with Coronation Street, with the idea being that its hard-hitting storylines would be a competitor with the BBC's EastEnders which started airing the following month.

The Practice was set in a GP's surgery in the fictional Manchester suburb of Castlehulme and had an initial run of 34 episodes airing for 30 minutes in an early evening slot on Friday and Sunday evenings throughout the Winter and Spring of 1985. However, the series did not perform as well as had been hoped and it disappeared from screens in May 1985. It returned for a second run of 13 one-hour episodes between May and 15 August 1986, this time airing in a 9 pm slot on Friday evenings. After series two ended no further episodes were made.

== Main cast ==
- John Fraser as Dr. Lawrence Golding
- Brigit Forsyth as Dr. Judith Vincent
- Simon Molloy as Supt. Edge
- Tim Brierley as Dr. David Armitage (Series 1)
- Rob Edwards as Dr. Chris Clark (Series 2)
