= Katie Redford (actress) =

English actress (born 1989)

- Born: Katie Ann Redford; 2 March 1989 (age 37); Stapleford, Nottinghamshire, England
- Occupations: Actress; writer; playwright
- Years active: 2013–present
- Known for: The Archers; Doctors; Mount Pleasant; Still Open All Hours
- Website: katieredford.com

Katie Ann Redford (born 2 March 1989) is an English actress, writer and playwright. Since 2017, she has portrayed the role of Lily Pargetter in the BBC Radio 4 soap opera The Archers, as well as making appearances in television series including Doctors as Bethany Morris and Still Open All Hours as Beth. She also played characters in Young Hyacinth and Mount Pleasant. Redford is also a writer, having written an audio drama Yellow Lips in 2021 and her debut play Tapped in 2022.

== Career ==
Redford was born in Stapleford, Nottinghamshire. She began her career working behind the scenes of the BBC soap opera Doctors as a runner. At the beginning of her acting career, she appeared in several short films including Pitfall, Turn Your Bloody Phone Off: American Blood, Turn Off Your Bloody Phone – Film 4 Frightfest: The Dark Heart of Cinema and Norm. In 2015, Redford was cast as Bethany Platt in the ITV soap opera Coronation Street. However, she was sacked before filming after it emerged that she had lied about her age, by saying she was 19 when she was in fact 25, in order to play 14-year-old Bethany. The role was recast to Lucy Fallon instead. Redford later said that she did not want to be in Coronation Street and received online abuse on social media. Redford has also played Lisa in the film Urban Hymn and Cazzy in the fifth series of the comedy Mount Pleasant. In 2016, she played Rose Walton in Young Hyacinth, the prequel to Keeping Up Appearances.

In 2017, Redford returned to Doctors, this time in an acting role as Bethany Morris, appearing in four episodes. Redford was then cast as Lily Pargetter in the BBC Radio 4 soap opera The Archers and was then cast in the role of Beth in Still Open All Hours and appeared until 2019. In 2018, she co-wrote and appeared in the short film Ghosted alongside Alison Steadman. In 2019, she played Lizzie Wiley in the Channel 5 mini drama Cold Call. She also played characters called Rose in Mister Runner and Werewolf in 2020 and appeared in the radio drama Teatime. In 2021, Redford played social worker Jane in the BBC comedy Alma's Not Normal and in 2022 appeared as Jill the Phone Woman in the episode of Not Going Out titled "Jury".

Redford began writing in between acting jobs and is a member of the BBC Writersroom Comedy Room. Redford wrote her first audio drama, Yellow Lips which debuted on BBC Radio 4 in 2021 and follows a daughter's memories of her mum's struggle with mental health. In 2022, Redford wrote a play called Tapped which was described in The Guardian newspaper as "episodic-TV quality, with some amusing dialogue and interesting narrative turns" and was rated three out of five stars. In 2026, she appeared in an episode of the BBC series Can You Keep a Secret? and appeared in the BBC medical drama Casualty as Laura Beech as part of a storyline.

== Filmography ==
Year	Title	Role	Notes
2013	Doctors	—N/a	Runner
2013	Pitfall	Chloe	Short film
2014	Turn Your Bloody Phone Off: American Blood	Janet	Short film
2014	Turn Off Your Bloody Phone – Film 4 Frightfest: The Dark Heart of Cinema	Janet	Short film
2014	Norm	Waitress	Short film
2015	Urban Hymn	Lisa	Film
2015	Mount Pleasant	Cazzy	Recurring role
2016	Young Hyacinth	Rose	Television film
2017–present	The Archers	Lily Pargetter	Radio role
2017	Doctors	Bethany Morris	Guest role
2018	Ghosted	Emma	Short film
2019	Cold Call	Lizzie	Recurring role
2017–2019	Still Open All Hours	Beth	Main role
2020	Mister Winner	Rose	Episode: "The Interview"
2020	Werewolf	Rose	Short film
2021	Alma's Not Normal	Jane	Recurring role
2022	Not Going Out	Jill the Phone Woman	Episode: "Jury"
2022	Outlander	Margit	Episode: "I Am Not Alone"
2026	Can You Keep a Secret?	Elle Kinsley	1 episode
2026	Casualty	Laura Beech	Recurring role
