= Sharon and Elsie =

- Genre: Sitcom
- Created by: Arline Whittaker
- Starring: Janette Beverley; Brigit Forsyth; Lee Daley; Maggie Jones
- Country of origin: United Kingdom
- No. of series: 2
- No. of episodes: 12

Production
- Producers: Roger Race; Mike Stephens
- Running time: 30 minutes

Original release
- Network: BBC1
- Release: 27 January 1984 – 26 July 1985

Sharon and Elsie is a British sitcom that aired for two series from 1984 to 1985. It starred Brigit Forsyth (best known for her role as Thelma Ferris in The Likely Lads and Whatever Happened to the Likely Lads?) and Janette Beverley.

Much of the humour is derived from the conflict between Elsie's middle-class life versus Sharon's more down to earth view of life.

== Plot ==
Elsie Beecroft (Forsyth) is a middle-aged, middle-class office administrator in a printing firm. Her world is perfectly ordered until young working-class girl, Sharon Wilkes (Beverley) is hired as the new office secretary. Initially prone to be snobbish, Elsie soon learns to appreciate Sharon and the two become friends.

Many episodes revolve around the family life of either Sharon or Elsie, with Sharon's brother Elvis (Lee Daley) and her boyfriend Wayne (John Wild) and Elsie's husband Roland (Bruce Montague) making regular appearances.

Factory scenes would usually involve the lecherous floor manager Stanley Crabtree (John Landry) and Sharon and Elsie's prickly responses to his womanising. Grumpy tea lady Ivy (Maggie Jones) would also make regular appearances.

== Cast ==
- Brigit Forsyth – Elsie Beecroft
- Janette Beverley – Sharon Wilkes
- John Landry – Stanley Crabtree
- Maggie Jones – Ivy
- Lee Daley – Elvis Wilkes
- John Junkin – Tommy
- John Wild – Wayne
- Gordon Rowlings – Ike Hepworth

== Episodes ==
The series did not have individual episode titles.

=== Series One (1984) ===
- 1.1. 27 January 1984
- 1.2. 3 February 1984
- 1.3. 10 February 1984
- 1.4. 17 February 1984
- 1.5. 24 February 1984
- 1.6. 9 March 1984

=== Series Two (1985) ===
- 2.1. 21 June 1985
- 2.2. 28 June 1985
- 2.3. 5 July 1985
- 2.4. 12 July 1985
- 2.5. 19 July 1985
- 2.6. 26 July 1985

== Transmission history ==
The series was shown on BBC1 between 1984 and 1985. It was also repeated on British satellite channel UK Gold in the early 1990s.

== Home media releases ==
The series has never been released on either video or DVD.
