= Brian Mills (television director) =

British television director (1933–2006)

- Born: Brian Arthur Mills; 25 October 1933; Manchester, England
- Died: 3 June 2006 (aged 72); Manchester, England
- Occupation: Television director
- Spouses: Hilda Miller (divorced) Brigit Forsyth (m. 1975; sep. 1999)
- Children: 3

Brian Arthur Mills (25 October 1933 – 3 June 2006) was a British television director, mainly for Granada Television. His credits (as director) include Strangers, Bulman, First Among Equals, Coronation Street and Granada's Sherlock Holmes series. He was the only television director to direct episodes of Coronation Street in each of its first five decades.

Mills was married to the stage and television actress Brigit Forsyth although they separated in 1999, seven years before his death on 3 June 2006 aged 72.
