= Cold Call =

2019 television miniseries

- Genre: Crime drama
- Created by: Karyn Dougan Buckland and Mark Buckland
- Written by: Karyn Dougan Buckland and Mark Buckland
- Directed by: Gareth Tunley
- Starring: Sally Lindsay; Daniel Ryan; Paul Higgins; Elizabeth Counsell; Taj Atwal
- Composer: Steve Pretty
- Country of origin: United Kingdom
- Original language: English
- No. of seasons: 1
- No. of episodes: 4

Production
- Executive producer: Mike Benson
- Producer: Rebecca Davies
- Cinematography: Benjamin Pritchard
- Editor: Andrew McKee

Original release
- Network: Channel 5
- Release: 18 November – 21 November 2019

Cold Call is a four-part British television miniseries, created and written by Karyn Dougan Buckland and Mark Buckland. It stars Sally Lindsay, Daniel Ryan, Paul Higgins, Elizabeth Counsell and Taj Atwal. It was produced by Acorn TV and broadcast on Channel 5 on four consecutive nights from 18 November to 21 November 2019.

== Synopsis ==
The series revolves around June Clark (played by Lindsay), an ordinary woman, who is scammed by a cold caller. She then tracks down the fraudster (Higgins) and begins working for him in order to bring him to justice. The series is currently available, as of January 2025, to watch via Netflix

== Leading parts ==
- Sally Lindsay as June Clarke
- Daniel Ryan as Des
- Paul Higgins as Kirk Wiley
- Taj Atwal as Hana
- Elizabeth Counsell as Elisabeth Wiley
- Katie Redford as Lizzie
- Samantha Power as Laura

== Episodes ==
No.	Episode	Directed by	Written by	Original release date	UK viewers (millions)
1	Episode 1	Gareth Tunley	Karyn Dougan Buckland and Mark Buckland	18 November 2019	N/A
2	Episode 2	Gareth Tunley	Karyn Dougan Buckland and Mark Buckland	19 November 2019	N/A
3	Episode 3	Gareth Tunley	Karyn Dougan Buckland and Mark Buckland	20 November 2019	N/A
4	Episode 4	Gareth Tunley	Karyn Dougan Buckland and Mark Buckland	21 November 2019	N/A

== Reception ==
The Times critic Carol Migley awarded the opening episode four stars out of five. The Daily Telegraph gave it three out five stars.
