= Paul Higgins (actor) =

Scottish actor (born 1964)

- Born: 3 December 1964 (age 61); Wishaw, Lanarkshire, Scotland
- Occupations: Actor, Writer
- Spouse: Amelia Bullmore (m. 1993)
- Children: 2

Paul Higgins is a Scottish actor, best known for appearing in the British television series The Thick of It, Utopia and Line of Duty.

== Early life ==
Higgins was born in Wishaw, Lanarkshire, Scotland. He was raised as a Roman Catholic, but now he considers himself a lapsed Catholic. As a teenager, he trained to be a priest, but gave his training up aged 17 when he began dating.

== Career ==
Higgins has appeared onstage in Paul and Black Watch, and in the film Complicity. He played Alan in Staying Alive, a hospital drama on ITV. He has also played Jamie McDonald, an aggressive press officer, in the BBC show The Thick of It and its spin-off feature-length film, In the Loop. In 2009, he appeared as Gil Cameron on the BBC drama Hope Springs. He played Michael Dugdale in Channel 4's acclaimed conspiracy thriller Utopia. In 2013 he appeared in series 1 of the BBC series Line of Duty and returned for season 4 in 2017. He wrote a play titled Nobody Will Ever Forgive Us, which was performed at the Traverse Theatre, Edinburgh in a co-production with the National Theatre of Scotland in November 2008.

In October 2026, Higgins appeared on stage, played a leading role in Robert Icke's production of The Lives of Others at the Adelphi Theatre, London, alongside Keira Knightley, Luke Thompson and Stephen Dillane.

== Personal life ==
Higgins is married to actress Amelia Bullmore, whom he met in 1992 while co-starring with her in A View from the Bridge in Manchester. Since December 2019 he has been Chair of ACT, the Actors' Children's Trust, and since September 2021 a Trustee of The Vegan Society.

== Filmography ==
Year	Film	Role	Notes
1986-90	Taggart	Alastair Finn/ David Crawford	TV series: 4 episodes
1988	A Very Peculiar Practice	Adie Shaw	TV series: 1 Episode
1988	The Play on One	Murdo Caldwell	TV series: 1 Episode ("A Wholly Healthy Glasgow")
1990	Boon	Simon	TV series: 1 Episode
1994	Being Human	Soldier	
1996-1997	Staying Alive	Alan McPherson	TV series: 12 episodes
1998	Bedrooms and Hallways	John	
2000	Complicity	Andy	
2000	Beautiful Creatures	Aidan	
2005-2007	The Thick of It	Jamie McDonald	TV series: 3 episodes
2006	Red Road	Avery	
2008	The Last Enemy	Professor Lawrence Cooper	TV series: 3 episodes
2009	Hope Springs	Gil Cameron	TV series: 8 episodes
2009	In the Loop	Jamie McDonald	
2009	Silent Witness	DS Nick Wallace	TV series: 2 episodes ("Safe")
2011	Vera	Clive Stringer	TV series: 1 Episode
2013	The Wrong Mans	PC Hennessy	TV series: 1 Episode
2012-2017	Line of Duty	ACC Derek Hilton	TV series: 11 episodes
2013-2014	Utopia	Michael Dugdale	TV series: 11 episodes
2015	Couple in a Hole	John	
2016	Raised by Wolves	Sean	TV series: 4 episodes
2017	Victoria & Abdul	Sir James Reid	
2017	Decline and Fall	Prison Officer	TV series: 1 Episode
2018	Apostle	Frank	
2018	The Party's Just Beginning	Liusaidh's Dad	
2019	Cold Call	Kirk Wiley	TV series: 4 episodes
2019	Greed	Jim McBride	
2021	Beep	Father Sydney	TV movie
2022-2026	Slow Horses	Struan Loy	TV series: 4 episodes
2023	Betrayal	Don	
2025	Brian and Maggie	Geoffrey Howe	TV series: 2 episodes
