= Brigit Forsyth =

English actress (1940–2023)

- Born: Brigit Dorothea Connell; 28 July 1940; Malton, North Riding of Yorkshire, England
- Died: 1 December 2023 (aged 83)
- Education: Royal Academy of Dramatic Art
- Occupation: Actress
- Years active: 1960–2021
- Known for: Whatever Happened to the Likely Lads?; The Evil of the Daleks; Still Open All Hours; Boon; The Practice; The Likely Lads; Playing the Field
- Spouse: Brian Mills (m. 1975; sep. 1999)
- Children: 2

Brigit Dorothea Mills (born Brigit Dorothea Connell; 28 July 1940 – 1 December 2023), better known by her stage name Brigit Forsyth, was an English actress from Malton, England, best known for her roles as Thelma Ferris in the BBC sitcom Whatever Happened to the Likely Lads? and Helen Yeldham in the ITV drama Boon. From 2013 to 2019, Forsyth appeared in the BBC sitcom Still Open All Hours.

== Early life ==
Forsyth was born as Brigit Dorothea Connell, on 28 July 1940 in Malton, North Riding of Yorkshire, England. Her grandfather was a doctor in the town and delivered her. Her mother, Anne (nee Forsyth) was a painter, and her father, Frank James Connell, an architect and town planner in Edinburgh. After leaving St George's School for Girls in Edinburgh, Forsyth trained as a secretary before enrolling at the Royal Academy of Dramatic Art in London, where she won the Emile Littler Award.

== Career ==
Forsyth began her professional career in Edinburgh with the Gateway Theatre Company (1960–61). She then moved to the Theatre Royal, Lincoln, (1961–62) and in 1962 to the Arthur Brough Players in Folkestone. On her return to Lincoln, she changed her professional name to Forsyth. Her film career began with the Roald Dahl-scripted The Night Digger (1971), playing a district nurse. Her film work also included a version of The Likely Lads (1976) as Thelma Ferris.

Forsyth played the cello from the age of nine, but abandoned it once she went to drama school; her ability was employed when, in 2004, she was cast in the lead role in Cello and the Nightingale, a play about internationally known cellist Beatrice Harrison that premiered at York Theatre Royal and in Killing Time (2019), an off-Broadway production in which she played the instrument and wrote the music.

Forsyth's best-known television work was Whatever Happened to the Likely Lads? as Thelma Chambers / Thelma Ferris (1972–74). She also appeared in The Glamour Girls (1980–82) as Veronica Haslett; Tom, Dick and Harriet (1983) as Harriet Maddison, The Practice as Dr. Judith Vincent (1986), Sharon and Elsie as Elsie Beecroft (1984–85), Playing the Field (BBC1, 1998) as Francine Pratt, and Boon (ITV, 1989) as Helen Yeldham. She guest-starred in a number of other television shows such as The Bill, Doctor Who (The Evil of the Daleks, 1967), Agatha Christie's Poirot and Coronation Street.

In 1997, she appeared in a one-off sketch as the party host, in Harry Enfield & Chums, in which Enfield parodies both ex-Democratic Unionist Party (DUP) leader Rev Ian Paisley and Sinn Féin president Gerry Adams at a house party.

In 2002, Forsyth was the subject of This Is Your Life when she was surprised by Michael Aspel at Broadcasting House. Forsyth appeared in the 2013 Christmas special of Still Open All Hours and returned for a full series on 26 December 2014 as Madge, sister of Maggie Ollerenshaw's character Mavis. In 2003 she made her first appearance at Regent's Park Open Air Theatre in their production of High Society, directed by Ian Talbot.

In 2013, Forsyth appeared as Mrs. Jennings in Helen Edmundson's BBC Radio 4 adaptation of Jane Austen's Sense and Sensibility and as the recurring character of Pearl in Ed Reardon's Week.

Her stage work included Humble Boy in 2003, Calendar Girls in 2008, and Alan Bennett's People in 2013. She had previously appeared in a Radio 4 production of Bennett's Single Spies in which she played the part of Coral Browne. In 2015, she appeared in Now This is Not the End at the Arcola Theatre in London.

== Personal life and death ==
Forsyth was married to television director Brian Mills from 1975, until his death in 2006, although they had separated in 1999. They had two children.

Forsyth died on 1 December 2023, at the age of 83.

== Filmography ==
=== Film ===
| Year | Title | Role | Notes |
|---|---|---|---|
| 1971 | The Road Builder | District Nurse | |
| 1976 | The Likely Lads | Thelma Ferris | |
| 1987 | Crystalstone | Isabel | |
| 1999 | Fanny and Elvis | Nurse Lynne | |

=== Television ===
Selected.

| Year | Title | Role | Notes |
|---|---|---|---|
| 1967 | Doctor Who | Ruth Maxtible | Episode: "The Evil of the Daleks" |
| 1973–1974 | Whatever Happened to the Likely Lads? | Thelma | 21 episodes |
| 1979 | Leave it to Charlie | Mary McLintock | Episode: "Money, Money, Money" |
| 1980–1982 | The Glamour Girls | Veronica Haslett | All 13 episodes |
| 1981–1982 | Holding the Fort | Annabel Chesterton | 2 episodes |
| 1982–1983 | Tom, Dick and Harriet | Harriet Maddison | All 12 episodes |
| 1982 | The Two Ronnies | Yvonne | Episode: "1982 Christmas Special" |
| 1984–1985 | Sharon and Elsie | Elsie Beecroft | All 12 episodes |
| 1985–1986 | The Practice | Dr. Judith Vincent | 46 episodes |
| 1989 | Agatha Christie's Poirot | Ernestine Todd | Episode: "The Adventure of the Clapham Cook" |
| 1989 | Running Wild | Jenny | 7 episodes |
| 1989 | Boon | Helen Yeldham | 13 episodes |
| 1991 | Dark Season | Miss Maitland | All 6 episodes |
| 1997 | Spark | Mrs. Wells | 5 episodes |
| 1998 | Coronation Street | Babs Fanshawe | Episode 4370 |
| 1998 | Heartbeat | Elsie Harris | Episode: "Snake in the Grass" |
| 1998–2002 | Playing the Field | Francine Pratt | 22 episodes |
| 2000 | Doctors | Penny Lattimer | Episode: "Twice Blessed" |
| 2002 | The Bill | Joanna Sulman | 2 episodes |
| 2005 | Down to Earth | Sylvia Cosgrove | 2 episodes |
| 2005–2006 | Emmerdale | Delphine LaClair | 4 episodes |
| 2006 | The Outsiders | Enid | TV film |
| 2006 | Doctors | Pauline Hasland | 5 episodes |
| 2007 | Heartbeat | Ellen Taylor | Episode: "Vendetta" |
| 2007 | The Street | Biopsy Doctor | Episode: "Old Flame" |
| 2007 | Jinx | Daphne | Episode: "Pilot" |
| 2008 | Waterloo Road | Susan Wilding | Episode: #3.15 |
| 2008 | The Royal Today | Shona Kelly | Episode: #1.30 |
| 2008 | Midsomer Murders | Estelle Balliol | Episode: "The Magician's Nephew" |
| 2012 | Mount Pleasant | Marie | Episode #2.4 |
| 2012 | Doctors | Sister Vincent | Episode: "Wide of the Mark" |
| 2013 | EastEnders: Dorothy Branning - The Next Chapter | Lucinda Blake | TV film |
| 2013–2019 | Still Open All Hours | Madge | All 41 episodes |
| 2013 | Hollyoaks | Cressida | 3 episodes |
| 2016 | Rovers | Marilyn | 2 episodes |
| 2016 | Holby City | Valerie Sturgeon | 2 episodes |
| 2017 | Unforgotten | Anne Barling | Episode: #2.4 |
