= Can You Keep a Secret? =

Can You Keep a Secret? may refer to:

- "Can You Keep a Secret?" (song) by Hikaru Utada
- Can You Keep a Secret? (novel) by Sophie Kinsella
- Can You Keep a Secret? (film) directed by Elise Duran
- Can You Keep a Secret? (TV series), a British television sitcom
- "Can You Keep a Secret?", a 2012 episode of the Indian TV series Best of Luck Nikki (the Indian adaptation of Good Luck Charlie)
- I Have a Crush at Work, also known as Can You Keep a Secret?, manga series by Akamaru Enomoto
