= Still Open All Hours =

British TV sitcom (2013–2019)

- Opening titles
- Genre: Comedy
- Created by: Roy Clarke
- Written by: Roy Clarke
- Directed by: Dewi Humphreys
- Starring: David Jason; James Baxter; Lynda Baron; Stephanie Cole; Maggie Ollerenshaw; Brigit Forsyth; Johnny Vegas; Tim Healy; Kulvinder Ghir; Sally Lindsay; Nina Wadia; Geoffrey Whitehead; Barry Elliot
- Country of origin: United Kingdom
- Original language: English
- No. of series: 6
- No. of episodes: 41 (list of episodes)

Production
- Producer: Gareth Edwards
- Production locations: Dock10 studios (2013); Teddington Studios (2014–2015); Pinewood Studios (2015–2019)
- Running time: 30 minutes
- Production company: BBC Studios Comedy Productions

Original release
- Network: BBC One
- Release: 26 December 2013 – 23 December 2019

Related
- Open All Hours; Seven of One

Still Open All Hours is a British sitcom (2013–2019) created for the BBC by Roy Clarke, and starring David Jason and James Baxter. It is the sequel to the sitcom Open All Hours (1976–1985), in which both Clarke and Jason were involved. The new series was launched following a 40th Anniversary Special in December 2013 commemorating the original series. The sitcom's premise focuses on the life of a much older Granville, who now runs his late uncle's grocery shop with the assistance of his son, continuing to sell products at higher prices alongside seeking to be with his love interest.

Unlike the original series, the cast for Still Open All Hours includes a more regular group of characters and additional side-plots. It has featured the return of Lynda Baron, Stephanie Cole, and Maggie Ollerenshaw as their characters from Open All Hours. Although the special received poor reviews, it attracted positive viewing figures, and the sitcom went on to air a total of 41 episodes across six series (compared to 26 episodes, over 4 series, for the original). A seventh series had been commissioned in 2019, but was delayed by the COVID-19 pandemic and despite plans to record it, the series was eventually cancelled in 2023, with the BBC saying it had no plans for any new episodes.

== Premise ==
Like Open All Hours, the sitcom is set within a small grocer's shop in the suburb of Balby, within Doncaster, South Yorkshire, and focuses on the life of Granville (David Jason) – now much older and the shop's owner, having grown into the same sort of person as his late uncle Arkwright was by learning from him his many ways of selling to customers. Assisting him in running the shop is Leroy (James Baxter), Granville's son by one of his previous girlfriends, who maintains a rather robust love life with several girls but struggles to cope with the work and sales approach of his father, much as Granville did with Arkwright.

Granville maintains a love life with the sweet but absent-minded Mavis (Maggie Ollerenshaw) who loves him in return, but finds his path to her often blocked by her sister Madge (Brigit Forsyth), a miserable woman who does not like men and chooses to keep Mavis from following a relationship with Granville. Both are regular customers of the shop, alongside others from the neighbourhood onto whom Granville tries to offload products which he has bought and had little success selling on under their original identity and price.

== Characters ==
=== Granville ===
Since Open All Hours, having lived his youth as a nice but shy and awkward man who struggled with shop life, but in his old age Granville has changed into a more toned-down version of his uncle Arkwright. Thanks to his uncle's training, he now exhibits a similar habit of selling goods at inflated prices, fabricating stories to sell useless and/or unsaleable items to hapless customers, and keeping a close watch on the money he spends – often through employing the use of a special money belt that causes slight issues and embarrassment at times. During his uncle's training, Granville engaged in relationships with several girlfriends, in which a fling in Blackpool resulted in the procreation of his son Leroy, whom he was left in charge of by the boy's mother. Following his uncle's death, Granville inherited the shop, which he runs alongside Leroy, often teasing his son over the identity of his mother (thus mirroring the original plot of Open All Hours where Arkwright teased Granville over his alleged Hungarian parentage) – whilst secretly concealing the fact that he knows who she is – while subjecting him to practical jokes and teaching him some of the tricks that Arkwright taught him. In Still Open All Hours he maintains a belief that his uncle lives on through the shop's till, often referring to it as Arkwright in later episodes, because of its propensity to open or close suddenly at times for various reasons (such as when there is mention of spending considerable money on something). Arkwright's framed portrait on the wall sometimes tilts when spoken to. As in Open All Hours, Granville jokingly imitates his uncle's stutter when reminiscing events from the past. Two episodes featured Arkwright's ghost turning lights on and off (Series 1, Episode 6, and the 2015 Christmas Special). As Arkwright did in the original series, Granville concludes every episode with an internal monologue where he reflects on the day's events as he closes the shop in the evening.

Like his uncle, Granville has a love interest of his own in Mavis, a woman he met during his youth and whom he still fondly loves. Unlike his uncle, Granville must struggle to be with Mavis since the end of her previous marriage, due to her sister Madge desiring to keep them apart. To try to distract Madge and hopefully remove her as an obstacle, Granville spends his time grooming one of his regulars, Gastric, into becoming Madge's love interest. In later episodes, he also finds himself trying to stop the advances of widow Delphine Featherstone, one of his uncle's customers (to whom he accidentally sent a love note that was meant for Mavis), by persuading fellow widower, Wilburn Newbold, to enter a relationship with her and maintain it, despite Mrs Featherstone's presence unnerving him.

=== Leroy ===
Leroy was born to a mother who his father met during a fling in Blackpool, but who he does not know about, despite Granville secretly knowing who she is; although his mother is talked about during the first series, including a visit by her to see Leroy, references about her become rare and non-existent in later episodes. Left in his father's care by his mother at a young age, Leroy suffers similar issues to those that Granville faced in his youth, such as having to be up early to open the shop, being on the receiving end of his father's practical jokes, and handling the deliveries of purchases to customers. Unlike his father, Leroy maintains an active social life with many young women, most having boyfriends that they do not mind ignoring to spend time with him (much to his father's dismay), while displaying a firm dislike of his father's penchant for unloading products he buys cheaply but cannot sell. By the fourth series, Leroy becomes committed to winning the affection of a local librarian, despite her values and vegan lifestyle.

=== Main/Recurring Characters ===
Character	Played by	Series						Episode count
Character	Played by	1	2	3	4	5	6	Episode count
Main Characters
Granville	David Jason							41
Leroy	James Baxter							41
Mrs Featherstone	Stephanie Cole							41
Mavis	Maggie Ollerenshaw							41
Madge	Brigit Forsyth							41
Eric Agnew	Johnny Vegas							40
Gastric	Tim Healy							40
Cyril	Kulvinder Ghir							40
Kath Agnew	Sally Lindsay							36
Wilburn Newbold	Geoffrey Whitehead							31
Mrs Hussein	Nina Wadia							22
Beth	Katie Redford							17
Nurse Gladys	Lynda Baron							13
Ruby	Sophie Willan							11
Mrs Rossi	Sue Holderness							10
Willis	Dean Smith							7
Jasmine	Archie Panjabi							4

== Episodes ==
Series	Episodes	Originally released	
Series	Episodes	First released	Last released
Special		26 December 2013	
1	6	26 December 2014	25 January 2015
2	6	27 December 2015	24 January 2016
3	7	1 January 2017	5 February 2017
4	7	7 January 2018	11 February 2018
5	7	7 October 2018	12 November 2018
6	7	18 October 2019	20 December 2019

Forty-one episodes of Still Open All Hours, all written by Roy Clarke, have been produced for the BBC. The show began airing on 26 December 2013 with an anniversary special of original series, Open All Hours All episodes had a running time of 30 minutes. Between Open All Hours and Still Open All Hours, there have been a total of 67 episodes and ten series broadcast between 1973 and 2019.

== Production ==
=== Series development ===
Still Open All Hours was first broadcast on 26 December 2013, with Jason reprising his role of Granville from Open All Hours. The new one-off episode written by Clarke showed Granville now running the shop with his son Leroy (played by James Baxter), after inheriting it from Arkwright. Clarke wrote the script in two weeks, and production began in October 2013. The exterior scenes were filmed at the original location on Lister Avenue in Doncaster from 18 to 20 November 2013. The interior scenes were recorded on 3 December 2013 at dock10 studios in Salford in front of a studio audience. A 30-minute documentary accompanying the show's return, entitled Open All Hours: A Celebration, aired on 27 December 2013, the day after the new episode was broadcast, on BBC One.

On 30 January 2014, the BBC commissioned Still Open All Hours for six new episodes beginning on 26 December 2014. The controller of BBC comedy commissioning, Shane Allen, said: "The resounding success of the Christmas revival showed the huge and enduring audience affection for this much-loved classic. Roy has done a terrific job of updating the characters whilst keeping what was warm-hearted and enjoyable about the world of the original series."

Production for series one began in August 2014, exterior filming started on 15 September and location work was completed on 26 September 2014. Interior scenes were recorded in front of a studio audience from 10 October until 21 November 2014 at Teddington Studios.

The show later returned for a second series, beginning on 26 December 2015. with production starting in September 2015. Exterior scenes were shot on location from 14–24 September 2015. Interior scenes were recorded before a studio audience at Pinewood Studios from 9 October until 20 November 2015.

In January 2016, David Jason said a third series would be produced during the year. The series began airing on 26 December 2016. Production started in September 2016 with on location for exterior scenes being shot in Balby Doncaster from 12 September 2016. Lynda Baron could not reprise her role as Nurse Gladys Emmanuel as the scheduled production dates clashed with Baron's EastEnders contract.

David Jason announced that a fourth series would be produced in 2017. Recording began in September 2017 with David Jason seen on location in Doncaster with co-star Tim Healy. The series began airing on 28 December 2017. Interior scenes were recorded at Pinewood Studios in front of a live studio-audience on 7, 14, and 21 October and on the 4, 11, 18, and 24 November 2016. In early 2017 a fourth series was commissioned with production beginning in August 2017. On location exterior scenes for the fourth series commenced on 11 September 2017 in Doncaster. For the original special and the first three series, all episodes were filmed in front of a studio audience. Series 4 was, by contrast, filmed on a closed set and screened to an audience for recording of a laughter track, due to cast availability problems. Series 5 and 6 continued in this vein.

In January 2018, it was announced the show will return for a fifth series late 2018. The fifth series was officially confirmed on 2 May 2018, with filming due to commence in the summer. On 21 December 2018, the BBC confirmed a sixth series that was commissioned for transmission in late in 2019. This would go on to be the last series (see below).

=== Filming locations ===
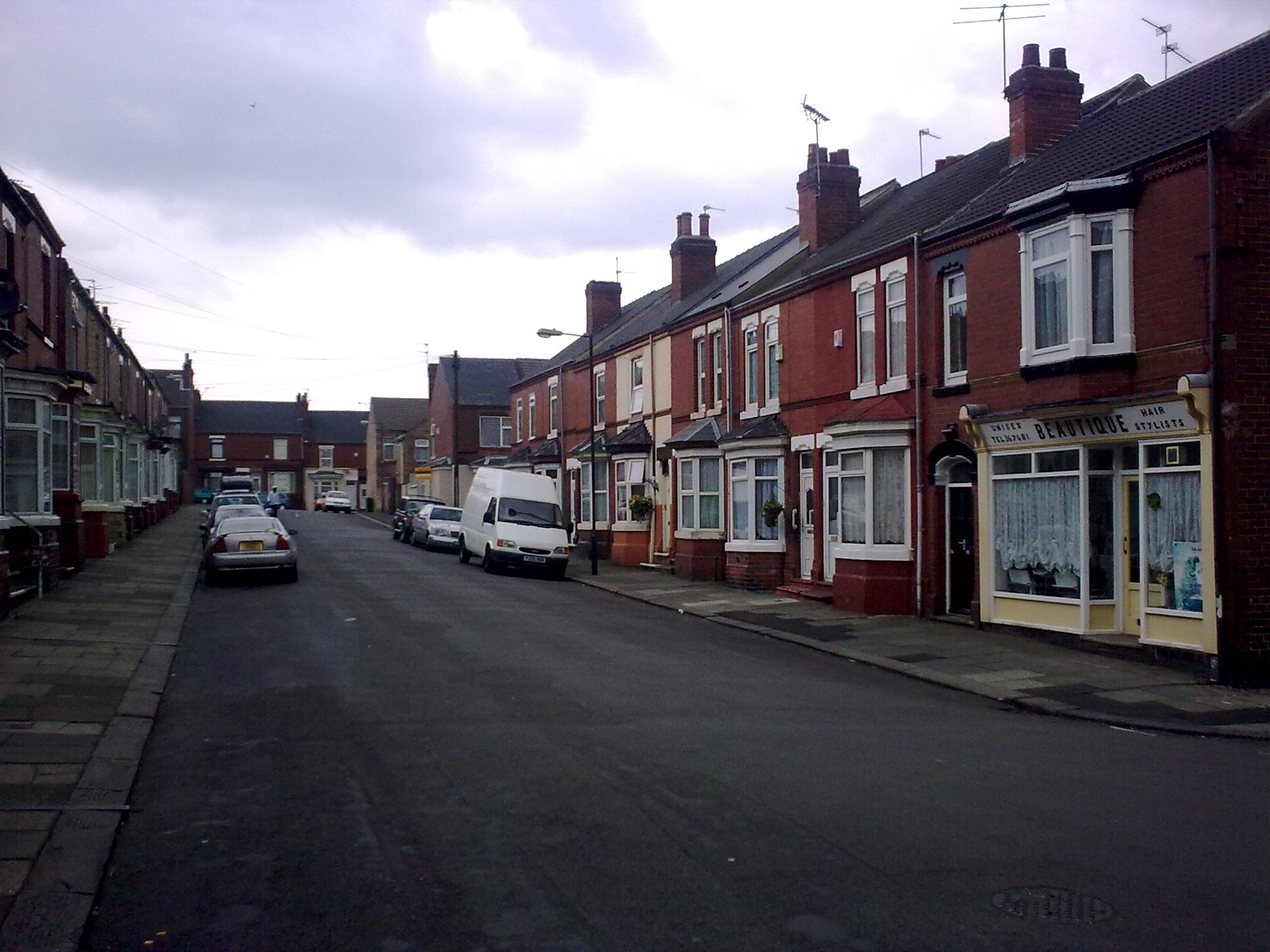
Lister Avenue in Balby is used for the filming of Still Open All Hours; 'Beautique' (sic) on the right, doubles as Arkwright's

The exterior shots reused the original shop from the series, on Lister Avenue in Balby, a suburb of Doncaster. The shop had to be extensively redressed (for both programmes) to resemble a traditional corner shop, as it has been a hair salon known as Beautique since 1962. This process took two days, before filming on location for three consecutive days. The hair salon "Beautique" is listed on Google Maps as "Arkwright's."

The studio recordings for the 2013 special were recorded at Dock10 at MediaCityUK. For the first series, Teddington Studios were used and the second, third, fourth, fifth and sixth series were all recorded at Pinewood Studios.

== Broadcast and reception ==
The special was broadcast on BBC One on 26 December 2013 and received 9.43m (39.9% of the audience) viewers according to overnight figures and was the most watched programme on that day. Final viewing figures showed that it was watched by 13.07m and was the most watched programme for that week. It received generally poor reviews from critics. Will Dean of The Independent, referencing Arkwright's trademark stutter, called it "a w-w-worthy effort" but criticised the attempt to revive the show without Ronnie Barker, who had died in 2005. Ben Lawrence of The Telegraph said it "felt like a relic of another era" criticising the jokes and Jason's performance. Jacob Mason, writing on the Radio Times website, described the show as "warmly nostalgic", whilst others noted it as "a fitting tribute to Ronnie Barker".

=== Cancellation ===
In 2019, a seventh series was commissioned by the BBC, but filming was postponed in the wake of the COVID-19 pandemic, with no confirmation of when it would resume. In 2020, the BBC refuted claims in tabloid newspapers that the programme had been axed, stating "discussions on future episodes ongoing". However, Gareth Edwards’ departure from the BBC, alongside that of the BBC's Controller of Comedy Commissioning, led to the programme's future becoming less certain in the intervening years, until in February 2023 the BBC confirmed the programme had been cancelled, after announcing that there was "no plans for new episodes". In December 2024 David Jason revealed that a script had been written by Roy Clarke and he hoped it would be commissioned in order to properly end the series.

== DVD releases ==
Although filmed and broadcast in High-definition, no Blu-ray releases have been announced. Series 1 and the 2013 Christmas Special was released on DVD on 2 February 2015 by 2 entertain. Series 2 was released on 1 February 2016. Series 3 was released on 13 February 2017. Series 4 was released on 19 February 2018. Series 5 was released on 7 January 2019. Series 6 was released on 6 January 2020. Series 1-6 was released on 5 June 2023.

DVD Title	No. of Discs	Special features	No. of Episodes	Release dates	
DVD Title	No. of Discs	Special features	No. of Episodes	Region 2	Region 4
Series 1	1	2013 Christmas Special	7	2 February 2015	24 June 2015
Series 2	1	2015 Christmas Special	6	1 February 2016	TBA
Series 3	1	2016 Christmas Special	7	13 February 2017	TBA
Series 4	1	2017 Christmas Special	7	19 February 2018	TBA
Series 5	1	2018 Christmas Special	7	7 January 2019	TBA
Series 6	1	2019 Christmas Special	7	6 January 2020	TBA
Complete Series 1-6	6	2013, 2015-2019 Christmas Specials	41	5 June 2023	15 May 2024

== See also ==
British sitcom
