= Open All Hours =

British TV sitcom (1976–1985)

- Genre: Sitcom
- Created by: Roy Clarke
- Written by: Roy Clarke
- Directed by: Sydney Lotterby
- Starring: Ronnie Barker; David Jason; Lynda Baron; Stephanie Cole; Maggie Ollerenshaw; Kathy Staff; Barbara Flynn; Frances Cox
- Theme music composer: Joseph Ascher
- Opening theme: "Alice, Where Art Thou?"
- Ending theme: "Alice, Where Art Thou?"
- Composer: Max Harris
- Country of origin: United Kingdom
- Original language: English
- No. of series: 4
- No. of episodes: 26 (list of episodes)

Production
- Executive producers: James Gilbert (pilot episode)
- Producers: Sydney Lotterby (1976–1985)
- Production location: England
- Running time: 30 minutes
- Production company: BBC

Original release
- Network: BBC2 (1976); BBC1 (1981–1985)
- Release: 23 March 1976 – 6 October 1985

Related
- Still Open All Hours; Seven of One

Open All Hours is a British television sitcom created and written by Roy Clarke for the BBC, starring Ronnie Barker as penny-pinching corner-shopkeeper Albert Arkwright and David Jason as his assistant and nephew Granville. The series began as a 1973 episode of Barker’s comedy anthology Seven of One and later ran for 26 episodes across four series, first broadcast on BBC2 from 20 February 1976, and on BBC1 from 1981 to 6 October 1985.

Set in a small grocer’s shop in Balby, Doncaster, the programme follows Arkwright’s attempts to maximise profits and pursue nurse Gladys Emmanuel (Lynda Baron), while Granville struggles with long hours and a stalled social life. The supporting cast includes Stephanie Cole, Maggie Ollerenshaw, Kathy Staff and Barbara Flynn.

Open All Hours ranked eighth in the 2004 Britain's Best Sitcom poll. A sequel series, Still Open All Hours, aired from 2013 to 2019.

== Premise ==
The show's setting is a small grocer's shop in Balby, a suburb of Doncaster in South Yorkshire. The owner, Albert Arkwright (Ronnie Barker), is a middle-aged miser with a stammer and a knack for selling. His nephew Granville (David Jason) is his beleaguered put-upon errand boy who blames his work schedule for his lacklustre social life.

Across the road lives nurse Gladys Emmanuel (Lynda Baron), largely occupied by her professional rounds, and her elderly mother. Arkwright longs to marry Gladys, but she resists his persistent pressures. In later episodes it is explained that the two have been engaged for many years but have been unable to wed because of the advanced age of her mother, for whom she cares at home, as well as the mutual loathing between her mother and Arkwright. Though short-tempered with her fiancé, she is concerned for his and Granville's welfare. In order to avoid Gladys's mother, Arkwright frequently attempts to 'visit' Gladys via a ladder to an upstairs window, which often ends in catastrophe.

Every episode ended with Arkwright delivering a monologue to himself reflecting on the day's events as he closed the shop for the evening.

== Episodes ==
Twenty-six episodes of Open All Hours, all written by Roy Clarke, were produced for the BBC. The show began airing in 1976 and ended in 1985 after the fourth series. All episodes have a running time of 30 minutes.

In 1999, Barker reprised the role of Arkwright for a BBC promotional video Shaggy Dog Story (TV), in which a number of figures from television comedy told a joke line-by-line.

=== Still Open All Hours ===
A sequel, entitled Still Open All Hours, was created in 2013 by original writer Roy Clarke and featuring several original cast members, including David Jason, Lynda Baron, Stephanie Cole and Maggie Ollerenshaw. On 30 January 2014, the BBC commissioned Still Open All Hours for six new episodes beginning on 26 December 2014 and ran for six series until 2019.

Open All Hours and Still Open All Hours, has run for a total of 67 episodes across ten series.

== Characters ==
=== Arkwright ===
Albert Arkwright is a pragmatic, miserly man with old-fashioned values, whose world seems to stop at his shop door, except for his lust for Nurse Gladys Emmanuel, which may prompt him on occasion to wander across the road, usually with a ladder, to gain access to her bedroom window. Arkwright is a dishonest character, who has many tricks to try to persuade a customer to leave his shop having bought at least one thing, and will avoid spending his own money at all costs. He is also protective of his savings, keeping some in his pocket wrapped in a gold chain, and some in an old, battered Oxo tin that he hides under the kitchen sink. This includes, or so he claims, coins from before 1922, when they were "solid silver".

=== Granville ===
Granville is the son of Arkwright's sister. She died a single mother when Granville was very young, leaving Arkwright to bring up the boy. Arkwright's jokes imply that his sister was promiscuous; he frequently speculates that Granville's father is Hungarian, and was forbidden to marry Granville's mother because she was English. He is often referred to as a "youth" or "young lad" (and, throughout season 3, repeatedly as "errand boy"), even though Granville is well into his adult years. (In the Pilot episode he states that he is 25 years old; in season 2 episode "St Albert's Day" (1981), it is implied that Granville was born circa 1949. The actor playing Granville was 36 in season 1 and in his 40s from season 2 onwards.)

Granville is shy, awkward, and kind, with priorities that differ from those of his uncle. He feels that he is missing out on life. People from Granville's past occasionally visit the shop, and he views their lives as more fulfilling than his own. He is constrained by his responsibilities at the shop and his uncle's belittling treatment.

When Granville has a fling with the milkwoman (played by Barbara Flynn), his uncle is unsupportive.

=== Main ===
Character	Played by	Series				Episode count
Character	Played by	1	2	3	4	Episode count
Main Characters
Arkwright	Ronnie Barker					26
Granville	David Jason					26
Nurse Gladys Emmanuel	Lynda Baron					26
Milk Woman	Barbara Flynn					11
Mrs Featherstone	Stephanie Cole					10
Mrs Blewett	Kathy Staff					7
Mavis	Maggie Ollerenshaw					7

== Production ==
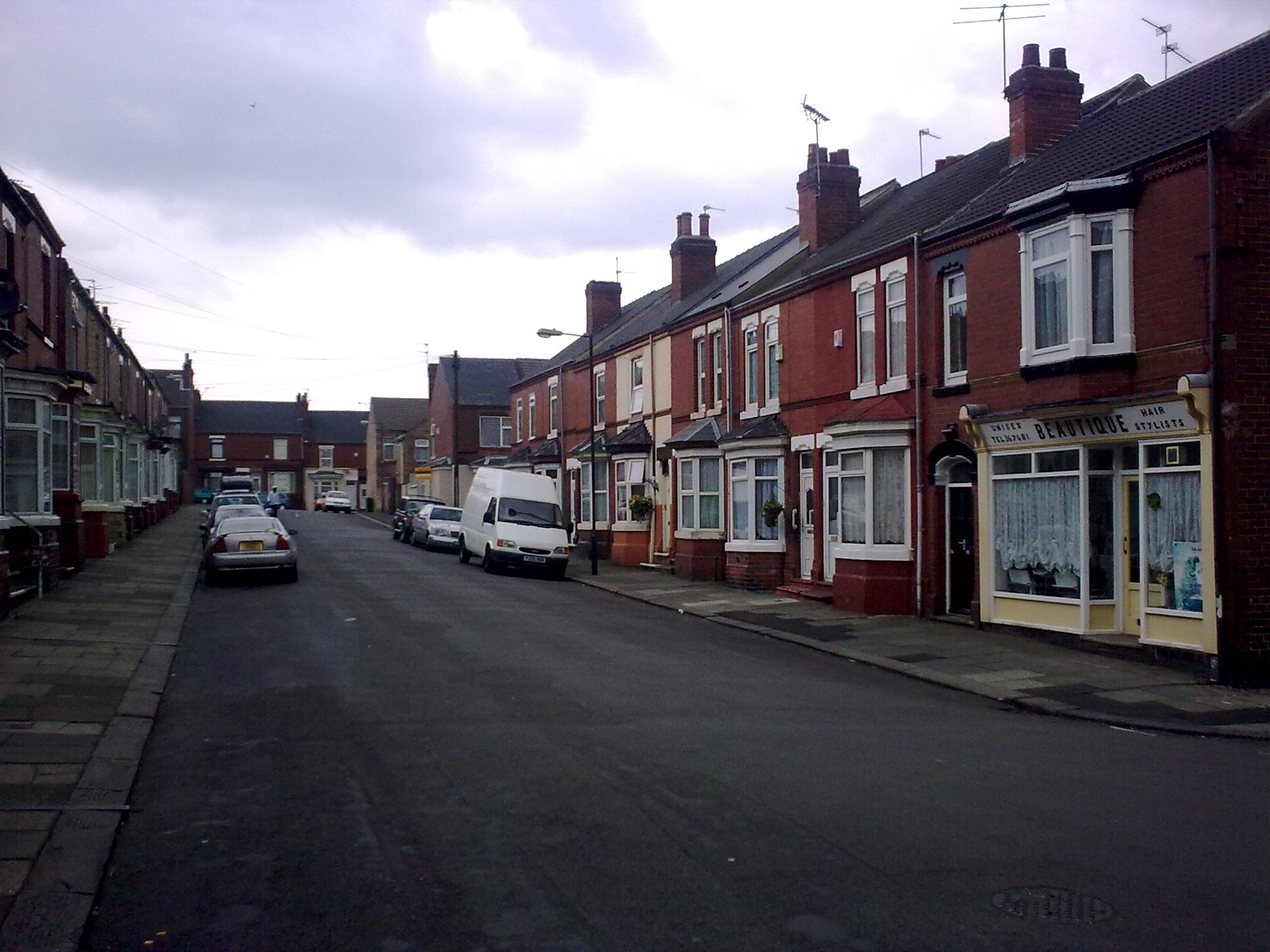
Lister Avenue in Balby, where exterior shots were set with 'Beautique', the shop used as Arkwright's, on the right.

=== Series development ===
The shop is based on two little stores called L E Riddiford in Thornbury, Gloucestershire and "Coopers" in Littlehampton, West Sussex where Barker lived at the time. Granville's name was taken from a nearby Granville Road. Roy Clarke visited this small town whilst travelling and was said to have fallen in love with the shop layout and its owner, Len Riddiford, while Barker brought in Coopers famous temperamental till and Arkwright's stammer.

Ronnie Barker proposed that Arkwright should have a stammer, and this was written into the character. Barker also co-created the premise of the dangerous till. In the series, the shop's antiquated till has a drawer that tends to snap shut suddenly. Even though this terrifies Granville and Arkwright, Arkwright refuses to replace the till due to the cost of a replacement, and because he believes it discourages burglars. In the documentary Open All Hours: A Celebration, Sydney Lotterby revealed that the till was controlled with a string by an assistant floor manager in the adjacent room, and that he once accidentally caught Barker's fingers while filming. By the time of Still Open All Hours, it is suggested that the till is now haunted by Arkwright's ghost as it sporadically opens and closes violently at the mere suggestion of Granville spending money.

=== Filming locations ===
Nurse Gladys Emmanuel, Arkwright and Granville

The exterior shots were shot on Lister Avenue in Balby, a suburb of Doncaster; South Yorkshire. The shop itself is a hairdresser's salon, which closed for a summer break during each year the series was being filmed by the BBC. The same location is used for the sequel series Still Open All Hours. The pilot episode (featured in the series Seven of One) used a shop front on the western intersection of Drayton Avenue and Manor Road in Ealing, London, for exterior filming.

In the first series, Nurse Gladys lives at 34 Lister Avenue. This is changed to 32 from the second series.

The local council considered demolishing the shop used in Open All Hours. A fan created a web site to garner support for preserving it. The shop was to be auctioned in Leeds on 24 November 2008, and was expected to fetch between £120,000 and £130,000; however, all bids fell short of the reserve price.

Three years earlier, a different sort of auction commemorated the programme. The BBC donated, to the British Stammering Association (BSA), two of the false moustaches worn by Ronnie Barker in the series. The BSA auctioned the moustaches at their London conference in September 2005, shortly before Barker's death.

=== Theme tune ===
Arkwright

The show's theme tune is a song called "Alice, Where Art Thou?", written by Joseph Ascher. The arrangement is borrowed from a 1926 Charles Penrose song called "Laughter And Lemons," the b side of the more well-known "The Laughing Policeman." It was arranged for a brass band and performed by Max Harris, who also wrote the incidental music for the programme.

== Reception ==
Barker noted in his autobiography It's Hello from Him that he received a letter which began "We are a family of stutterers...", that made his heart sink. However, the writer went on to praise his portrayal and added that the whole family found the character hilarious.

== Merchandise ==
=== Books ===
Two books related to the programme have been released in the UK. One was written by Graham McCann and published by BBC Books in October 2014 and the other one, a 'novelisation' based on scripts for the first series, was written by Christine Sparks and was published by BBC Books.

- Open All Hours

This was published in February 1981 which is based on the original programme. Sparks, Christine (February 1981). Open All Hours:[Papercover]. BBC Books. ISBN 0563179244.

- Still Open All Hours: The Story of a Classic Comedy

This was published on 30 October 2014. Graham McCann (30 October 2014). Still Open All Hours: The Story of a Classic Comedy [Hardcover]. BBC Books. ISBN 978-1849908863.

=== VHS releases ===
A selection of 15 episodes of the series was released on five VHS cassettes by BBC Video on 2 April 1990, 12 June 1995, 4 March 1996, 2 June 1997, and 2 March 1998. Universal Playback, under licence by BBC Worldwide, released Series 1 and 2 as a three tape boxset on 19 August 2002 and Series 3 and 4 as a three tape set boxset on 2 June 2003.

=== DVD releases ===
All four series have been released in Regions 2 and 4, both individually and in box sets. Region 1 has released the box set but the series have not been released individually there. In Australia, the BBC with Roadshow released "Series One: Episodes 1–3 Comedy Bites" in 2010.

DVD Title	Discs	Year	Ep. No.	DVD releases			Notes
DVD Title	Discs	Year	Ep. No.	Region 1	Region 2	Region 4	Notes
Complete Series 1	1	1976	7		30 September 2002	1 April 2003	Includes the 1973 pilot
Complete Series 2	1	1981	7		29 September 2003	3 December 2003	
Complete Series 3	1	1982	6		4 October 2004	2 March 2005	
Complete Series 4	1	1985	6		31 October 2005	8 August 2006	
Complete Series 1–4	4	1976–1985	26	9 June 2009	13 November 2006	1 August 2007	Includes the 1973 pilot

== Planned spin-off ==
In 1984, at which time no new episodes of the series had been produced for two years, a spin-off was proposed based around Lynda Baron's character, Nurse Gladys Emmanuel. Given the working title Call the Nurse, this spin-off series would have followed Nurse Gladys as she visited various eccentric and demanding patients. The characters of Arkwright and Granville were not written to appear, and Roy Clarke was keen to develop a new set of supporting characters rather than rely on those already built up for Open All Hours. A thirty-minute pilot was written but did not enter production as the BBC turned down the series; instead, Open All Hours returned for its fourth and what would be its final series the following year.

== See also ==
- British sitcom
- British comedy
