= Lynda Baron =

English actress and singer (1939–2022)

- Baron as Auntie Mabel in Come Outside
- Born: Lilian Ridgway; 24 March 1939; Urmston, Lancashire, England
- Died: 5 March 2022 (aged 82); London, England
- Education: Royal Academy of Dance
- Occupations: Actress; singer
- Years active: 1958–2022
- Television: Open All Hours (1976–1985); Come Outside (1993–1997); Fat Friends (2002–2005); EastEnders (2006, 2008–2009, 2016); Still Open All Hours (2013–2019)
- Spouses: Cyril Smith (m. 1962, divorced) John M. Lee (m. 1966; died 2001)
- Children: 2

Lilian Ridgway (24 March 1939 – 5 March 2022), known professionally as Lynda Baron, was an English actress and singer. She is known for having played Nurse Gladys Emmanuel in the BBC sitcom Open All Hours (1976–1985) and its sequel, Still Open All Hours (2013–2016), Auntie Mabel in the award-winning children's series Come Outside (1993–1997), and the part of Linda Clarke in EastEnders in 2006 and from 2008 to 2009, with a brief return in 2016.

== Early life ==
Lilian Ridgway was born on 24 March 1939 in Urmston, Lancashire. Her father, Cyril, was a painter and decorator. By the age of five she was attending local ballet classes, and soon began appearing on stage. She attended Flixton Girls School in Urmston and then trained as a dancer at the Royal Academy of Dance. Early in her career, she appeared in repertory theatre and several West End venues.

== Career ==
=== Television ===
Baron's early television roles included small parts in Up Pompeii! (1970), Z-Cars (1971) and Crossroads (1978). Baron appeared on television in BBC-3 (1965), a series in the vein of That Was the Week That Was, involving some of the same performers. She also alternated with Annie Ross as the resident singer on Not So Much a Programme, More a Way of Life (1965). Baron was cast in the BBC science fiction series Doctor Who three times. She was heard as a singer in the 1966 serial The Gunfighters. She appeared in front of the cameras as Captain Wrack in the 1983 serial Enlightenment, and again in 2011 in "Closing Time" as Val.

Baron is best known for playing Nurse Gladys Emmanuel in the BBC sitcom Open All Hours with Ronnie Barker and David Jason which ran for four series in 1976, 1981 to 1982 and in 1985, and was subsequently voted eighth in Britain's Best Sitcom in 2004. The script asked for a character "of ample proportions", although she was in fact of a slim build at the time. They overcame this by padding her clothes.

In the 1970s and 1980s, Baron co-starred in the ITV sitcom Oh No It's Selwyn Froggitt and the BBC sitcom A Roof Over My Head with Brian Rix. She had a small part in Minder, and played the middle-aged temptress Lily Bless'er in the Last of the Summer Wine episode "Getting Sam Home". In 1986, she acted in a party political broadcast for the SDP–Liberal Alliance. Baron also appeared in the 1987 Christmas special of The Two Ronnies and appeared in the BBC Two comedy series KYTV.

In the 1990s, Baron played Auntie Pat in five episodes of the ITV sitcom The Upper Hand (1992–1993). Baron then went on to star in the children's television series Come Outside (1993–1997) playing Auntie Mabel, an everyday woman living in a bungalow in Denham, who flew around on various adventures in her spotted aeroplane with her dog Pippin, educating children on how things are created and where they come from by visiting various factories or farms and even looking at wildlife in zoos.

In 1997, Baron played the minor part of Renee Turnbull in Coronation Street and took guest roles in dinnerladies (1998), The Mrs Bradley Mysteries (1998), Sunburn (1999), Nancherrow (1999) and Goodnight Sweetheart (1999).

Baron continued to work regularly on television and the stage in the 2000s, with credits including Fat Friends (2000–2005), The Bill (2000), Doctors (2000, 2006, 2010, 2011 and 2014), Peak Practice (2001), Holby City (2002 and 2006), Down to Earth (2005), Rome (2005) and Casualty (2009).

Baron briefly appeared in the BBC One soap opera EastEnders in 2006 as Linda Clarke, the mother of Jane Beale, played by Laurie Brett. In September 2008, it was announced that Baron would be returning to EastEnders. She appeared regularly in the series from November 2008 to February 2009. On 8 April 2016, it was announced that Baron would return to EastEnders once again, alongside John Partridge, who portrayed her on-screen son Christian Clarke. She appeared on screen in May and June 2016.

In August 2010, Baron appeared in an episode of Agatha Christie's Marple on ITV. In September 2010, Baron appeared in a one-off television drama, The Road to Coronation Street on BBC Four, which looked back at the early days of the British television soap opera Coronation Street. Baron portrayed actress Violet Carson, who played Ena Sharples in the soap opera. Baron was nominated for the 2011 British Academy Television Award for Best Supporting Actress for this role.

On 26 December 2013, Baron reprised her role in a special one-off episode of Open All Hours on BBC One, entitled Still Open All Hours. It was watched by 12.23 million viewers, almost a 40% share in audience figures on Boxing Day. The following day, Baron took part in Open All Hours: A Celebration, a programme looking back on the sitcom. Following the success of the Christmas episode, the cast made a full series, which began on 26 December 2014, followed by a second series in December 2015. A third series began in December 2016, but Baron was unable to return because of other commitments.

In December 2016, Baron made a guest appearance in a Christmas special of Citizen Khan and, in January 2017, she appeared in an episode of Father Brown, which was to become her final television appearance.

=== Film ===
Baron's film appearances include roles in The Small World of Sammy Lee (1963), Hot Millions (1968), Mrs. Brown You've Got a Lovely Daughter (1968), Can Heironymus Merkin Ever Forget Mercy Humppe and Find True Happiness? (1969), Tiffany Jones (1973), and the Hammer film Hands of the Ripper (1971) as an ill-fated prostitute. She also appeared in the Barbra Streisand film Yentl (1983), Carry On Columbus (1992), Colour Me Kubrick (2005) and Scoop (2006) directed by Woody Allen.

=== Stage ===
In 1987, Baron played Stella in the first London production of the musical Follies at the Shaftesbury Theatre, later recorded. In 2007, she starred with Orlando Bloom and Tim Healy in a stage version of In Celebration. In May and June 2009, she appeared at the Menier Chocolate Factory in a production of Rookery Nook by Ben Travers.

From October 2010 to February 2011, Baron starred with Maureen Lipman and Roy Hudd in a West End production of When We Are Married by J.B. Priestley. In March 2013, she appeared in a production of D.H. Lawrence's play The Daughter-in-Law at the Sheffield Crucible. She appeared as the Aunt in Stevie by Hugh Whitemore alongside Zoe Wanamaker and Chris Larkin at the Minerva Theatre, Chichester from April to May 2014. Baron again appeared in the play from March to April 2015 at the Hampstead Theatre.

Baron's other theatre credits include An Inspector Calls, Stepping Out, Entertaining Mr Sloane, and The Full Monty.

=== Other work ===
Baron sang Asphynxia in EMI's 40th anniversary recording of Salad Days, conducted by John Owen Edwards, in 1994. In 1995, Baron voiced the character of Nanny Ogg in the BBC Radio 4 adaptation of the Discworld novel Wyrd Sisters. This same year she voiced the character of Angela Jefferies in the BBC Radio 4 sitcom titled England's Glory opposite Keith Barron. In April 2012, Richard Kates released an album entitled There's Something About You, which featured Baron performing the track "A Hard Man Is Good to Find". On 11 May 2012, Baron appeared in the Afternoon Play on BBC Radio 4, Mrs Lowry and Son, playing the mother of artist L. S. Lowry.

== Personal life and death ==
In 1962, Baron married hairdresser and music impresario Cyril Smith, who performed under the name Carol London; they later divorced. In 1966, she married John M. Lee. The couple had two children and were married until his death in 2001.

Baron died on 5 March 2022 aged 82. The official Twitter accounts of CBeebies and EastEnders posted tributes to Baron.

A short tribute to Baron aired as part of The One Show on the evening of 7 March 2022.

== Filmography ==
=== Film ===
Year	Title	Role	Notes
1963	The Small World of Sammy Lee	Yvette	
1964	Hide and Seek	Flying Jacket	
1968	Mrs. Brown You've Got a Lovely Daughter	Miss Fisher	
1968	Hot Millions	Louise the Waitress	
1969	Can Heironymus Merkin Ever Forget Mercy Humppe and Find True Happiness?	Baby Boobala Salesgirl	Uncredited
1971	Universal Soldier	Party Guest	Uncredited
1971	Hands of the Ripper	Long Liz	
1973	Tiffany Jones	Anna Karekin	
1983	Yentl	Peshe	
1992	Carry On Columbus	Meg	
2001	Diggity's Treasure	Emma Stamps	
2005	Colour Me Kubrick	Mrs. Vitali	
2006	Scoop	Tenant	
2010	You Will Meet a Tall Dark Stranger	Alfie's Date	
2012	Run for Your Wife	Nurse	Cameo
2017	Mary and the Witch's Flower	Great-Aunt Charlotte	Voice
2020	Dream Horse	Elsie	

=== Television ===
Year	Title	Role	Notes
1962	The Rag Trade	June	Episode: "Stay-in Strike"
1966, 1983, 2011	Doctor Who	Various	Serials: "The Gunfighters", "Enlightenment" and "Closing Time"
1967	Theatre 625	Alice Smith	Episode: "The Magicians: Edmund Gurney and the Brighton Mesmerist"
1970	Up Pompeii!	Ambrosia	Episode: "The Love Potion"
1971	Z-Cars	Margaret Roe	Episode: "Funny Fellah"
1973	Men of Affairs	Mrs. Westerby	Episode: "Episode Fourteen"
1976–1985	Open All Hours	Nurse Gladys Emmanuel	Regular; 25 episodes
1977	Oh No It's Selwyn Froggitt	Vera Parkinson	Regular:Series 2 & 3 (12 Episodes)
1977	A Roof Over My Head	Sheila	Regular: 7 episodes
1977	Don't Forget to Write!	Sylvia Rhode	Episode: "Thundering Hooves"
1978	Crossroads	Phoebe Tompkins	3 episodes
1979	How's Your Father?	Angela Sudbury	Episode: "The Older Woman"
1979, 1980	Minder	Barmaid/Sadie	2 episodes
1980	Grundy	Beryl Loomis	Regular: 6 episodes
1983	Last of the Summer Wine	Lilly Bless Her	Episode: "Getting Sam Home"
1987	The Two Ronnies	Gepetto's Wife	Christmas Special
1990	KYTV	Cecily Fenton	Episode: "Those Wonderful War Years"
1991	Plaza Patrol	Carmen MacKendrick	Episode: "Lilac Time"
1992–1993	The Upper Hand	Aunty Pat	7 episodes
1993–1997	Come Outside	Auntie Mabel	Regular; 40 episodes
1997	New Voices	Barmaid	Episode: "New Voices"
1997	Coronation Street	Renee Turnbull	2 episodes
1998	Dinnerladies	Carmel	Episode: "Scandal"
2000	The Bill	Sadie Tyler	Episode: "Catch a Falling Star
2000	Big Kids	Aunt Muriel	Episode: "Aunt Muriel"
2000-2009	Doctors	Various	9 episodes
2001	Peak Practice	Joan Campbell	Episode: "Trust in Me"
2002–2005	Fat Friends	Norma Patterson	Regular; 19 episodes
2002-2006	Holby City	Alice Fry/Shirley Jackson	2 episodes
2005	Rome	Madame	Episode: "Egeria"
2006, 2008–2009, 2016	EastEnders	Linda Clarke	Recurring; 32 episodes
2009	Casualty	Molly	Episode: "As Others See Us"
2010	The Road to Coronation Street	Violet Carson	TV movie
2010	Agatha Christie's Marple	Mrs. Coppins	Episode: "The Pale Horse"
2010–2011, 2014	Doctors	Ag Penrose	Recurring role
2013–2016	Still Open All Hours	Nurse Gladys Emmanuel	Regular; 13 episodes
2014	Chasing Shadows	Maggie Hattersley	Regular; 4 episodes
2016	Citizen Khan	Clarenza	Episode: "It's a Khanderful Life"
2017	Father Brown	Mrs Rudge	Episode: "The Theatre of the Invisible"
