= South Park: The Fractured but Whole =

2017 video game

- Developer: Ubisoft San Francisco (Note: Additional work by Ubisoft Osaka, Massive Entertainment, Ubisoft Annecy, Ubisoft Reflections, Ubisoft Blue Byte, and Ubisoft Quebec. Nintendo Switch port developed by Ubisoft Pune.)
- Publisher: Ubisoft
- Directors: Trey Parker; Christopher Brion; Jason V. Schroeder
- Producers: Eric Stough; Adrien Beard; Bruce Howell; Todd Benson; Elena-Diana Sfecia
- Designer: Kenneth Strickland
- Programmer: Hiro Kobota
- Artists: Joel Hanlin; Shawn Hricz
- Writers: Trey Parker; Jolie Menzel; Matt Stone
- Composer: Jamie Dunlap
- Series: South Park
- Engine: Snowdrop
- Platforms: PlayStation 4; Windows; Xbox One; Nintendo Switch
- Release: October 17, 2017: PlayStation 4, Windows, Xbox One; October 17, 2017; Nintendo Switch; April 24, 2018
- Genre: Role-playing
- Mode: Single-player

South Park: The Fractured but Whole is a 2017 role-playing video game developed by Ubisoft San Francisco and published by Ubisoft in collaboration with South Park Digital Studios. Based on the American animated sitcom South Park, it is the sequel to the 2014 video game South Park: The Stick of Truth. The game's narrative occurs one day after the events of its predecessor; it follows the New Kid, who has recently moved to South Park and becomes involved in an epic roleplay involving two rival superhero factions vying to create their own superhero media franchises. The superheroes' game unintentionally uncovers a conspiracy to raise crime in the town, bringing them into conflict with supervillains, genetically engineered monsters, the police, crime families, and the new kingpin of crime.

The game is played from a 2.5D third-person perspective, replicating the aesthetic of the television series. The New Kid is able to freely explore South Park, interacting with characters, undertaking quests, and accessing new areas by progressing through the main story. The player can choose from up to ten superhero archetypes ranging from high-speed Speedsters, close-combat Brutalists, powerful Psychics, and healing Plantmancers; each offering unique abilities. The New Kid and up to three allies fight their enemies using attacks including melee, ranged, and powerful farts. Battles take place on a grid, around which participants can move freely. Attacks have specific areas of effect, requiring tactical positioning for attack and defense.

Following Ubisoft's purchase of the rights to The Stick of Truth in 2013, the company moved development of the sequel from Obsidian Entertainment to Ubisoft San Francisco. South Park creators Trey Parker and Matt Stone were unsure whether to make a sequel to the 2014 game or work on a new film project, opting for the game. Parker and Stone were involved throughout the game's production; they wrote its script, consulted on the design, and voiced many of the characters. The show's composer Jamie Dunlap worked on the game's soundtrack alongside Ubisoft San Francisco, creating music that was heavily inspired by the scores of several superhero films.

Like its predecessor, the release of The Fractured but Whole was subject to several delays. The game was initially set for release in December 2016 but it was postponed for nearly a year. It was released worldwide for PlayStation 4, Windows, and Xbox One on October 17, 2017. The game received generally positive reviews, which praised the improvements and creativity of combat scenarios and faithfulness to the source material. Reviewers were divided over the story; some critics called it a humorous improvement, while others said it was less effective and relied too much on toilet humor. The game received post-release supplemental story missions as downloadable content (DLC) and a Nintendo Switch version in 2018.

== Gameplay ==
South Park: The Fractured but Whole is a role-playing video game that is viewed from a 2.5D, third-person perspective. The player controls the New Kid as they explore the fictional Colorado town of South Park, around which the player-character can be freely moved. A fast-travel system allows the character to be moved between unlocked travel points.

The game allows the player to select one of ten archetypal superhero player-characters; the nimble Speedster, the short-range, high-damage Brutalist, the long-range, moderate-damage Blaster, the weather-based Elementalist, the offense-attracting Cyborg, the long-range, status effecting Psychic, the stealthy Assassin, the gadget-using Gadgeteer, the healing Plantmancer, and the high-damage, swift Martial Artist. At first only three choices are available (Blaster, Speedster, and Brutalist); the New Kid can eventually access all ten classes, freely matching powers from the available classes, for example, the player can use the Blaster's fire blasts, the Assassin's knives, and the Martial Artist's kicks. The player can assign four powers from the classes, three regular attacks, and one ultimate attack. Ultimate attacks can only be used after filling the Ultimate bar, a pool of points shared between the New Kid and their allies that is increased by completing timed button presses during the attacking and defending phases. Throughout the game, the player can select up to three allies from twelve characters to accompany them in battle, each possessing three powers and an ultimate attack.

"The New Kid" (bottom right) and their allies (right) in a battle against Raisins girls (left); the bottom left shows the available attacks while the bottom right shows the turn order. The blue outline on the grid highlights the movable area, and the red area shows the current attacks area of effect.

The Fractured but Whole retains the turn-based combat of the previous game in the series, South Park: The Stick of Truth (2014). Instead of taking place on a static plane, battles are fought on a variable-size grid on which the player and enemies can move freely to create strategic advantages. The grid can contain environmental hazards such as exploding chemical barrels, and lava (red Lego bricks). The player selects attacks from a menu. Attacks can be augmented with contextual button presses for extra damage. Timed button presses during enemy attacks can recover some health after being hit and increase the Ultimate meter. Attacks offer effects including abilities with "knockback" damage, which can be used to forcibly move an opponent around the battlefield and inflict status effects such as poisoning, freezing, burning, and bleeding, which inflict damage over time.

Each attack affects a different area of the grid, requiring strategic positioning to hit enemies and avoid attacks. The attacker can increase damage by knocking targets into each other or into an ally. Healing items can be used in battle, requiring one turn per use. The player can collect artifacts and equipment to boost the player's Might, making them stronger in battle and offering benefits such as increased defense; more artifacts can be used as the player's level increases. The player-character has a DNA slot, allowing them to use strands of DNA to boost attributes called Brawn, Brains, Health, Spunk, and Move. The non-player character, PC Principal, can teach the player to recognize microaggressions in enemy dialogue, which allows the player a free in-battle attack against an enemy. Some characters, such as Jimbo and Ned, Classi, Gerald Broflovski, and Moses, can be summoned during battle; Moses heals all allies while the others deliver powerful attacks.

The New Kid can manipulate time with their farts; this ability can be used in battle to skip an opponent's turn, pause time to move around the grid and inflict out-of-turn damage, or summon a past version of the New Kid to join the battle. The New Kid's farting power can also be used to reverse time, fix objects, and pause time to avoid obstacles or fast-moving targets. Some areas of the town are inaccessible until the player gains specific allies who can use the New Kid's farting power to overcome the obstacle: Captain Diabetes can be sent into a rage that allows him to move heavy objects; the Human Kite can fly the New Kid to otherwise unreachable heights; Toolshed's sandblaster can clear paths that are blocked by lava that cause the player to combust; and Professor Chaos can launch a hamster from the New Kid's rectum to reach and sabotage electrical panels.

The player can modify the New Kid's appearance, superpowers, gender, sexuality, race, and ethnicity at any time in the game. Gender choices include male, female, and non-binary. Costume items can be collected, mixed together and recolored but have no influence on the New Kid's abilities. The New Kid's race selector is represented as a difficulty level slider, with lighter skin being easy and darker skin being harder. The slider does not affect combat but affects the amount of money the player can receive and the way some characters speak to the New Kid.

The game has three combat difficulty levels, which affect the power of enemies in relation to the player; "Casual" (weaker enemies), "Heroic" (normal enemies), and "Mastermind" (stronger enemies). A crafting system allows the player to use recovered or purchased resources such as duct tape, glue, sports drink bottles, and taco-related products to craft items such as healing burritos and quesadillas, costumes, and artifacts. The player is encouraged to explore the wider game world to defecate in toilets in a mini-game, find yaoi art depicting intimate moments between the characters Tweek and Craig, or take self-portraits with town residents to increase their followers on Coonstagram, an Instagram-like social media feed. The player must amass a certain number of social media followers to complete certain story missions. The character's cellphone serves as the game's main menu, containing items including the inventory, character profiles, and active quests.

== Synopsis ==
=== Setting ===
South Park: The Fractured but Whole is set in South Park, a fictional town in the Colorado Rocky Mountains. The game's events occur one day after those of its precursor, The Stick of Truth; the player again controls the New Kid, a silent protagonist. The children abandon their fantasy role-playing game to become superheroes and create a superhero media franchise. Unable to agree on who will get a film or Netflix series, the characters split into two rival factions, Coon and Friends and the Freedom Pals, and vie to create their own franchise first.

Led by the raccoon-clawed Coon (Eric Cartman), Coon and Friends operates from the Coon Lair, the Coon's basement. The group includes The Human Kite (Kyle Broflovski), the life-leeching Mosquito (Clyde Donovan), the super-fast Fastpass (Jimmy Valmer), the powerful Super Craig (Craig Tucker), super-strong Captain Diabetes (Scott Malkinson), and the New Kid. The Freedom Pals are led by the telekinetic Dr. Timothy (Timmy Burch), and includes Mysterion (Kenny McCormick), Toolshed (Stan Marsh), the weather-wielding Wonder Tweek (Tweek Tweak), and mechanized Tupperware (Token Black). Other playable characters include the hacker Call Girl (Wendy Testaburger) and the supervillain Professor Chaos (Butters Stotch). The heroes' journey brings them into conflict with groups including the local elderly population, ninjas, the sixth graders, the Hooters-parodying Raisins girls, hobos, and Kyle's cousin Kyle Schwartz.

The Fractured but Whole features characters from the series' history, including: Stan's father Randy, Butters' father Stephen, Kyle's parents Gerald and Sheila, the school principal PC Principal, Moses, Seaman, school counselor Mr Mackey, Detective Yates, strippers Spontaneous Bootay and Classi, Big Gay Al, gun enthusiasts Ned and Jimbo, Father Maxi, Jesus, the Crab people, the Memberberries, Towelie, and a Kanye West-inspired Gay Fish. The game also features Morgan Freeman as a taco shop owner. Locations from the show featured include the City Wok restaurant, the Peppermint Hippo strip club, Kenny's House in the abandoned, gentrified district SoDoSoPa, the classier Shi Tpa Town containing Skeeter's Bar and Jimbo's Guns. The Memberberry Farm and the road to Canada are also featured in the game. Many of the characters are voiced by South Park co-creators Trey Parker and Matt Stone.

=== Plot ===
The Coon and Friends kids go back to playing Stick of Truth with the New Kid, before Cartman and the other children decide to play superheroes with the goal of launching a superhero media franchise by finding a missing cat and claiming the $100 reward. The New Kid joins the game and Cartman provides them with a tragic backstory of witnessing their father have sex with their mother, with Cartman apparently not realizing that this is normal.

Coon and Friends' search uncovers a conspiracy led by a new and unknown kingpin who has united the police department, multiple crime families, the sixth graders, and Butters' Chaos Minions to steal cats and use their urine to contaminate drugs and alcohol, making the townspeople act crazy and raising crime, which will be blamed on the mayor. After fighting the Freedom Pals twice, Coon and Friends defeat Butters, and Cartman surmises that the kingpin is Mitch Conner, a crude hand puppet drawn on Cartman's left hand. The New Kid and Butters are sent to infiltrate the Freedom Pals to gain more information, culminating in the two groups co-operating to take down the police department. Afterwards, Coon and Friends merges with Freedom Pals after learning Timmy has developed a franchise plan that is more inclusive than Cartman's.

The next day, Mitch kidnaps the New Kid's parents and destroys Timmy's plan. The Freedom Pals capture Cartman, who insists he has no control over Mitch and reveals that the New Kid's parents are being held at Dr. Mephesto's genetic engineering lab. There, the Freedom Pals learn Mitch has been funding the creation of an army of mutated cats and sixth graders, which Mitch unleashes on the children. Battling through the mutants, the New Kid finds their parents and is forced to kill one of them to continue. At the exit, the Freedom Pals are ambushed by a mutated clone of Kyle Schwartz. The New Kid uses a powerful fart to defeat the clone, which accidentally transports the Freedom Pals one week into the future, where Mitch is the mayor.

With aid from Morgan Freeman, the New Kid learns to time travel with their farts. They travel to the future where Mitch has completed his master plan to make every day Christmas Day, causing drunken anarchy throughout the town, and have to fight the Woodland Critters with the help of Santa Claus. They then travel to the past, defeat past versions of the New Kid and Coon and Friends playing Stick of Truth, and confront Cartman. Mitch reveals himself and punches the New Kid, causing a fart that sends them back to the New Kid's superhero origin. Cartman and the New Kid's interference prevents the New Kid's father from having sex with their mother, changing the past. The New Kid's parents reveal their secret; they have the superhuman ability to amass social media followers. The government kidnapped the parents to harness their powers, during which time they fell in love and had the New Kid. They escaped to protect their child and gave them medicine to suppress their powers, causing extreme flatulence.

Knowing the truth, the New Kid time travels with Cartman to the day of Mitch's inauguration. The Freedom Pals confront Cartman, with Kyle using a Mitch puppet of his own. Cartman escapes and prepares to be sworn in as Mitch. Wendy uses social media to publicly reveal Mitch's plot and accuse Cartman of raising crime so the Coon would have more crime to fight, giving him a bigger franchise. Mitch claims he was traumatized as a child because "someone fucked my dad". Mitch's mother appears on Cartman's right hand and reveals that it was her and asks for forgiveness. They fight and both "die", ending Mitch's plot, while the townspeople resolve to obtain clean drugs and alcohol from the neighboring town. After the credits, the New Kid returns home to find both parents are alive and, unburdened by the secret they were keeping, their relationship is happier. While the New Kid's parents go upstairs to have sex, Butters confronts the New Kid and offers the New Kid a chance to take an alternative, darker path.

==== From Dusk till Casa Bonita ====
The New Kid investigates an infestation of Vamp Kids at the Casa Bonita Restaurant in Denver, as Kenny believes they have taken his sister Karen. The Vamp Kids' leader, Mike Makowski, is at Casa Bonita to celebrate his birthday with his step-father Mr. Adams. Kenny and the New Kid battle through Casa Bonita, recruiting Cartman and Goth Kid Henrietta Biggle along the way, and locate three vampire relics to unlock passage to the birthday room. There, the New Kid defeats Mike, forcing the Vamp Kids to retreat to the diving cliffs. Mr. Adams reveals himself as the Master Vampire (dressed as David from The Lost Boys (1987)) and attempts to summon Corey Haim to battle the New Kid, but inadvertently summons Michael Jackson. Jackson possesses Karen and battles the New Kid, but is ultimately defeated, which convinces Karen that the Vamp Kids are "fucking lame." She admits that she played with the Vamp Kids because Kenny was always too busy; he promises to spend more time with her.

==== Bring the Crunch ====
The New Kid investigates missing counsellors at Lake Tardicaca summer camp alongside Jimmy, Butters, and fellow superhero Mint-Berry Crunch. While investigating the camp, the New Kid's party is forced to flee after being ambushed by people dressed as monsters. While hiding in a shed, the New Kid uses multiple tools to unlock the abilities of the "final girl in every horror movie", which they use to defeat the monsters. The group learns that Nathan, Jimmy's rival, hired the "monsters" to kidnap the camp counselors so the camp would be forced to close, but his dim-witted sidekick Mimsy misunderstood Nathan's instructions and had the counselors killed. The New Kid's party defeats Nathan and Mimsy, rescuing the sole surviving counselor, who is in turn kidnapped by the alien Zarganor, who seeks revenge against Mint-Berry Crunch. Zarganor mind-controls Timmy and uses him, Nathan, and Mimsy to battle the New Kid. He is ultimately killed and the counselor drags Nathan and Mimsy away to toast marshmallows, to Nathan's dismay. With the camp back in operation, Mint-Berry Crunch reveals that Zarganor was an escaped slave from his family's berry mines and thanks his disturbed allies for helping punish Zarganor, before flying away.

== Development ==
In March 2014, South Park creators Matt Stone and Trey Parker stated they were open to making a sequel to South Park: The Stick of Truth, depending on its reception. When Ubisoft offered to develop a new game, Parker and Stone discussed the proposed game sequel or the possibility of making a film. They wanted to ensure quality control and decided that because of commitments to the television series and their families, they could only work on one big project and chose to work on the game.

During development of the previous game by Obsidian Entertainment for publisher THQ, Ubisoft bought the rights to the game after THQ went into bankruptcy. Ubisoft chose to develop the sequel internally, replacing Obsidian Entertainment with the nearly 100-member team at Ubisoft San Francisco (USF). The team, which was responsible for the Rocksmith series of music video games, recruited experts in role-playing games and their related systems. Additional support work was done by Ubisoft Osaka, Massive Entertainment, Ubisoft Annecy, Ubisoft Reflections, Blue Byte, and Ubisoft Quebec.

Parker and Stone were involved throughout the development cycle. At the beginning of development, they met with the team at Ubisoft to determine the game's storyline and elements of The Stick of Truth they were unhappy about. Ubisoft game developers, including senior producer Jason Schroeder, visited South Park studios twice monthly for a few days or conducted teleconferencing meetings. Schroeder was responsible for declining Stone and Parker's requests when necessary. Although meetings still took place, Parker and Stone became less available to the Ubisoft team during production of South Park, which had a tight production schedule.

Ubisoft adapted Snowdrop, its proprietary game engine, to allow the importing of the Autodesk Maya art assets used in the show rather than emulating them as in The Stick of Truth. This allowed the Ubisoft team to iterate and implement changes to the game and storyline late into the development schedule, meaning it could satirize recent events that occurred only months before release and incorporate elements from South Park episodes produced during the game's development, including the character PC Principal, and the gentrification areas of the town. Of last-minute changes, Schroeder said, "If it doesn't mess with our age rating? It shouldn't be a problem". Senior animator Lucas Walker said the changes to the engine took approximately a year to implement, but they were necessary to allow more seamless collaborations with South Park Digital Studios, including the use of the original animation rigs to emulate movement.

Even with the ability to easily import the South Park series' assets, the engine was designed for the development of 3D environments not 2D animation. The game required an amount of detailed work to match the movement style of the show and the expressions used by the characters. The game's executive producer, Nao Higo, said building all of the game's content would have been impossible for the relatively small team, believing they would need three-or-four times the staff to accommodate the project. USF worked extensively with South Park Digital Studios, which helped create animations and assets for the game.

The Fractured but Whole, was publicly revealed on June 15, 2015, at Ubisoft's press conference at the 2015 Electronic Entertainment Expo, and in June 2016 a release date of December 6 was set. In September that year, the game's release was postponed to early 2017. In February 2017, it was again postponed to between April 2017 and March 2018. In May 2017 it received its eventual release date of October 17. Discussing the delays, Higo said USF was unhappy with the game's quality and wanted more time to refine it. These refinements often led to story changes—sometimes for pacing or comedy purposes—which meant entire sections of the game and their assets needed to be reworked. Some missions were completely removed despite being far into development. Unlike more typical videogame prototyping, in which designers experiment with simple gameplay demos, USF relied more heavily on interactive storyboards of the script to gain a sense of the location and the narrative. Parker and Stone provided feedback and the designers would change the storyboard until it was considered to be perfect. The Fractured but Whole was officially released to manufacturing on September 22, 2017.

=== Writing ===
Parker and Stone wrote the script in Movie Magic Screenwriter, complete with stage directions that were edited or translated into gameplay by narrative designer Jolie Menzel and her team. The game script is 360 pages long, which is twice the size of that of the previous game, and equivalent to four or five feature films, according to the show's executive producer Frank C. Agnone II. Between them, Stone and Parker recorded approximately 20,000 lines of dialogue. During production, Parker became ill and had to undergo emergency gallbladder surgery. Parker persuaded his doctor to allow him to temporarily leave the hospital to record dialogue. On his return to the hospital, Parker told Agnone, "I just want this game to be sweet".

Parker and Stone considered it important to prevent the superhero setting from overwhelming the main focus of the story, which is fourth-grade children playing together and dressing up as heroes to enhance that experience. Stone said it is important to retain the game's charm and remind the player the characters are children playing. Parker's and Stone's original concept for the title was The Butthole of Time, but Ubisoft told them retailers would not stock a product bearing the word "butthole". Parker said he sat at his desk for hours working out a way to sneak the word into the title. Parker said, "how do I get butthole, butthole, butt hole, butt hole, but hole, but whole!"

=== Design ===
The levels were designed to allow combat; when battles take place the player is not taken to an abstract map as in The Stick of Truth. Schroeder said, "when we have to cut away from a certain background for the fighting it kind of broke the feeling of I'm fighting where I'm exploring so we thought about what can we do to make the place I'm exploring also the combat space?" The team considered removing movement from a previously explorable area did not work, so they added movement to combat, which in turn led to the more tactical combat in The Fractured but Whole. Schroeder described the concept as a mixture of Parker's affection for board games and Stone's preference for shooter, action, and sports games. The design team retained the turn-based combat system of The Stick of Truth because it better enabled the implementation of timing for jokes. Parker invited Schroeder and lead designer Ken Strickland to play the board game Star Wars: Imperial Assault, which helped them develop a unified jargon language and a common understanding of the game's campaign. Later in development, Parker and Stone played early builds of the game, helping them visualize their planned changes. They wrote out ideas for changes and feedback on a whiteboard, which the Ubisoft team used to understand what was required of them. Parker and Stone watched Let's Play videos by PewDiePie of The Stick of Truth to observe a consumer playing it and giving feedback about the game and considering what worked and what did not work.

Schroder said the USF team had to adapt to prioritizing comedy and comedic timing over gameplay, meaning it was more important to convey humor than to improve systems. They sometimes needed to step back from the less comfortable aspects of Parker's and Stone's design, at one point contemplating an autoplay option that would complete segments for the player, such as a sequence in which the 9–10-year-old protagonists give a lap dance in a strip club in a minigame. The team decided allowing players to opt out of the interactivity removed the core of the joke, forcing the player to participate in "this ridiculous thing". Menzel said good interactive comedy was dependent on a more intimate relationship between the joke teller and receiver, and making the player participate or even be responsible for the joke; for instance giving them control over interrogating someone by farting, heightened the South Park humor by making the player responsible for the things they see in the show.

The finished game features ten classes of superhero, but early in development it featured up to twelve, including the Mystic. USF chose the Brutalist, Speedster, and Blaster as starting classes because they were simple to understand. The developers decided to separate the player's statistics from their clothing choices. Schroeder said players can create their own superhero brand by dressing the player-character as they want, citing the popularity of The Stick of Truth for online streaming. They developed the Artifact system, which could be used to enhance statistics, as an alternative A rejected option for The Stick of Truth was the choice to play as a girl, which could not be included without altering the entire narrative. They chose to include it in The Fractured but Whole; Stone said he always plays as a girl where the option exists.

The Fractured but Whole offers twelve allies compared to The Stick of Truth's six; USF wanted them, their powers, and their associated dialogue to be a more frequent presence, involving them in both battles and exploration. While some of the children have genuine super powers, such as Mysterion's immortality, the realism of the remaining characters' powers is left deliberately ambiguous to maintain the illusion of children playing a game. Menzel said, "We want to continually dip into their imagination and let the player be in the kids' imaginations". The Coon will greatly exaggerate his abilities to suggest things he is not capable of, so the designers added small touches like having him trip or fall over.

=== Music ===
Main Theme
The score was inspired by the soundtracks of various superhero films.

South Park composer Jamie Dunlap and USF lead audio designer Nicholas Bonardi were responsible for the game's sound. While The Stick of Truth largely used music and sounds pulled directly from the show, the USF team aimed to create an original sound. Early in development, Bonardi created a temporary score by piecing together music from the show for the game, but found Dunlap's experience on the rapidly-produced show meant he could deliver music quickly enough that it was sometimes easier to ask him directly for original music. Bonardi and his team also created original music for The Fractured but Whole, but Dunlap's input ensured it retained the South Park sound. The game's sound design was inspired by several superhero film scores; The Coon's and Mysterion's themes are based on Christopher Nolan's Dark Knight Trilogy. The score for Coon and Friends is based on that of The Avengers (2012), while that of their rivals Freedom Pals is inspired by the X-Men series of films. Other inspirations included Superman (1978) and Batman Returns (1992), and the Castlevania video game series, which inspires the Vamp Kids theme.

The Ubisoft team had access to cheap sound effects albums used for foley sounds on South Park, but needed to make additional sounds for the game. USF had an area set aside for making fart sounds, stocked with plungers, a vuvuzela, and noise putty. Bonardi estimated they created more than 100 unique fart sounds for the game to reduce the repetitiveness of the sounds, which are used frequently in the game. They also mixed in other sounds, for instance the farts heard when the player and Kyle work together is mixed with the sound of a jet engine.

== Release ==
The Fractured but Whole was released worldwide on October 17, 2017, for PlayStation 4, Windows, and Xbox One. In contrast to the previous game, The Fractured but Whole was released worldwide without having to censor any content. In a September 2017 interview, USF associate producer Kimberly Weigend said the game's content was not tamer than that of The Stick of Truth, and the uncensored release was possibly a sign of censors becoming more open to ideas and that interactive media was a relatively new medium and the ratings system was evolving alongside it. Design director Paul Cross said to prevent the difficulties The Stick of Truth experienced, USF tried to avoid content they knew would be censored, but that Parker and Stone would tell the story they wanted regardless of censorship concerns.

In addition to the standard game, special versions were released at launch. The Gold Edition included a set of in-game costumes, a bonus perk, and a Season Pass granting access to post-launch downloadable content (DLC). The Steelbook Gold Edition, which was presented in a metallic case, featured the standard game, all of the Gold Edition content, and a series of lithographic prints displaying art by South Park Studios. The Collector's Standard Edition contained the game, the lithographic prints, and a 6-inch model of Cartman as "The Coon" by UbiCollectibles and ArtToyz. The Collector's Gold Edition contained all of the extra items. People who pre-ordered the game received a downloadable version of The Stick of Truth and the character Towelie as an in-game assistant. The PlayStation Store offered exclusive avatars of Kenny, Butters, Stan, Kyle, Cartman, and Coon and Friends; and Amazon released an exclusive bundle of the game that came with the Steelbook case and a remote-controlled model of Coon on a tricycle. The voiced figure can be controlled by an App available for Android and iOS users.

As a promotional item, the team designed and created the Nosulus Rift, a parody of the Oculus Rift, which appeared at the PAX West event in September 2016. Developed internally at Ubisoft as a joke about a fake prop the team would promote as real, the team decided to develop the item. Nosulus Rift, which was not released for sale publicly, would release a fart smell to create an olfactory-immersive experience. Ubisoft ran the worldwide "I am the fart" competition in October 2017; the jury, which included British flatulist Mr. Methane, judged videos of entrants farting and selected an overall winner, who would be flown to Ubisoft San Francisco to record their fart sound for inclusion into The Fractured but Whole. A twelve-character series of collectible figures based on The Fractured but Whole's cast was also released. A Nintendo Switch version, adapted by Ubisoft Pune, was released on April 24, 2018.

First broadcast in October 2017, South Park episode "Franchise Prequel" serves as a narrative prequel to the game and features the characters wearing outfits and acting out roles similar to those in the game. In the episode, Coon and Friends attempt to launch their superhero media franchise but are derailed by Professor Chaos, who launches a plot to spread fake news on Facebook about the boys. Chaos is defeated but the boys are divided over their media franchise, leading into the events of The Fractured but Whole.

=== Downloadable content ===
Several downloadable content (DLC) items were released alongside the game. These items were provided for a fee and include the "Relics of Zaron" pack that contains various costume items and perks, and "Towelie: Your Gaming Bud", which causes the character Towelie to appear and give comical advice to the player during the game. The first post-release DLC, "Danger Deck", was released on December 19, 2017. It involves a combat challenge in Doctor Timothy's Danger Deck, the Freedom Pals' iPad-walled training room, where the player can engage in increasingly-difficult virtual combat scenarios in new locations. Success is rewarded with items and costumes usable in the main game.

Two story-based DLC packs were developed for The Fractured but Whole. The first, "From Dusk till Casa Bonita", was released on March 20, 2018. It requires the player to team up with the Coon and Mysterion to rescue Mysterion's sister, Karen, from the Vamp Kids, who are celebrating Mike Makowski's birthday, at the Casa Bonita restaurant. The DLC introduces the Netherborn class with four new abilities, and the goth Henrietta, as a witch ally. The second DLC, "Bring the Crunch", was released on July 31, 2018. In it, the player teams up with Mint-Berry Crunch, an alien wielding the tremendous power of mint and berries, to uncover the mysterious disappearances of camp counsellors at Lake Tardicaca. The DLC introduces the Final Girl class, which features new combat tactics and traps. All of the downloadable content was made available with the optional "Season Pass". Although Parker and Stone were opposed to DLC in The Stick of Truth, believing it would consist of content that had been cut from the main game for lack of quality, during development of The Fractured but Whole they had ideas for side stories they deemed too distant from the main story but they wanted to expand on this material as DLC.

== Reception ==
=== Critical response ===
Reception

Aggregate score
| Aggregator | Score |
|---|---|
| Metacritic | (PC) 81/100 (PS4) 79/100 (XONE) 84/100 (NS) 80/100 |

Review scores
| Publication | Score |
|---|---|
| Destructoid | 8.5/10 |
| Electronic Gaming Monthly | 9/10 |
| Game Informer | 8.75/10 |
| GameRevolution | 3.5/5 |
| GameSpot | 8/10 |
| GamesRadar+ | 4.5/5 |
| Giant Bomb | 4/5 |
| IGN | 8.5/10 |
| PC Gamer (US) | 86/100 |
| Polygon | 7/10 |

South Park: The Fractured but Whole received positive reviews from critics. Review aggregator website Metacritic provides the consensus "generally favorable reviews" for the PlayStation 4, Windows, and Xbox One versions.

Like its predecessor, the game was considered a successful adaptation, with GamesRadar+ calling it "the truest, best adaptation" of South Park ever made, with well balanced comedy and humor, and IGN saying it looks and sounds like an episode of the show. Giant Bomb, GamesRadar+, and Shacknews said it was an improvement in nearly every way over The Stick of Truth, being deeper and more polished than its predecessor. GamesRadar+ added that after twenty years, a South Park game that is as "fun to play as it is to laugh along with" has been created. PC Gamer called it "streamlined, imaginative, and enormously entertaining"; and Electronic Gaming Monthly (EGM) said it would be difficult to find a more complete South Park experience that is as funny. Game Informer called it a welcome sequel, featuring both "smart and immature jokes", and moments of sincerity that recall the "charm of childhood". Slant Magazine said mechanically, it was "one of the best, most accessible RPGs" in a long time.

Reviewers alternately said that the humor was more original and less reliant on callbacks, and sometimes too reliant on references to the TV series. Several reviewers criticized some of the humor, which they saw as deliberately edgy, banal, or over-focused on fart and poop jokes. Slant Magazine singled out the strip club battles as "appallingly sexist and racist". Others said that it is consistently amusing and provocative throughout, but without the series' typical edge, and containing nothing as shocking as The Stick of Truth's Nazi Zombie Fetuses. It was noted that the game still delivered shocking moments such as corrupt police, self-flaggelating priests, and the children in the strip club.

Critics were consistent in their praise of the combat and its improvements over the system featured in The Stick of Truth. PC Gamer's Andy Kelly described it as one of the "most enjoyable" RPG combat systems he had experienced. Reviewers said that it offered a positive change from its predecessor, prioritizing strategic thinking over reflexes, and a variety of teams possible from the wide cast of available characters. PC Gamer said combat was "deeper, richer, and more strategic", and among others, called it fun. Game Informer and GamesRadar+ appreciated that the ability to move about the battle grid allowed for greater agency and thoughtfulness.

Boss battles were often cited as a highlight for their deviations from normal combat by introducing timed, out-of-turn attacks, environmental hazards, and side tasks such as reaching the end of the battlefield before a boss catches the player-character. Giant Bomb said these elements are some of the cleverest and most enjoyable parts of the game, and GamesRadar+ appreciated that the designers removed the ability to patiently strategize. Polygon said these elements, with their unique requirements adding to the intensity but sometimes becoming frustrating, were the only time they found combat challenging. Others called the combat too easy, even at the highest difficulty setting, but IGN said that while The Stick of Truth got easier as the game progressed, The Fractured But Whole's ambitious combat was prevented from getting stale by the various combat subversions it introduces. The various Ultimate moves were considered to be hilarious and impressive, with Polygon saying they were as epic as a summon in Final Fantasy, but they were also criticized for being unskippable, making them feel too long and repetitive later into the game. VideoGamer.com said battles sometimes seemed too long, and IGN noted that battles used only three timing mini-games, making them repetitive. IGN highlighted the small character touches in combat, such as the character Tupperware vomiting inside his own helmet when "grossed out", and Destructoid said each character was different enough to warrant tactical thinking about which characters to add to the New Kid's party.

The story received a polarized response; reviewers alternately called it well-crafted and an improvement over The Stick of Truth's, or muddled and lesser than its predecessor. GameRevolution and VideoGamer.com said the story was not as strong as its predecessor's; VideoGamer.com highlighting repetitive jokes as a negative. PC Gamer said the main story suffered from pacing issues that slowed events down, that it was predicable, and that its satire was not as edgy. Destructoid said that despite some uneven writing, the game felt like a long, quality episode of South Park, and GameRevolution said it was too reliant on fart jokes. Giant Bomb similarly said it could seem like a "cavalcade of poop jokes", but the South Park humor and charm is evident as the story progresses. IGN said the writing quality had lived up to high expectations, and EGM said it featured both a well-crafted main story and comedic side quests. GamesRadar+ said the game starts slowly but the pace escalates quickly into an intriguing mystery with one of the television series' best villains, and Shacknews called it an "absurd, but enthralling tale, but not so long as to overstay its welcome or get stale".

Some reviewers said the story found moments of sweetness or innocence in its characters; Slant Magazine called it poignant for its mission involving the New Kid resolving the dispute between gay couple Tweek and Craig. Other reviewers noted "heartfelt" moments in scenes depicting the difficulty of being a new kid with unhappy parents, and "sweet and silly" touches where epic battles are interrupted by a passing car, or certain characters arbitrarily change the rules of the game during a battle. Some of the commentary was considered to be raised as an issue without ever being properly addressed. Several critics singled out the series of events in which the corrupt police force send the New Kid to arrest innocent black men. Slant Magazine said the race-based difficulty slider encapsulated everything they felt was wrong with The Fractured but Whole; biting social commentary but a throwaway joke because the slider does not affect any in-game elements.

Some reviewers were critical of the similarity between The Fractured But Whole's and The Stick of Truth's gameplay area, which no longer had the benefit of the original's novelty. However, Destructoid said it was no less fun to explore and find the many references to the show's history. GamesRadar+ said that despite its relatively small map, the game sometimes felt like there was too much to do. Reviewers criticized the crafting system, which they considered gave too many of some items and not enough of others, and said it seemed unnecessary since additional items could be bought directly from shops. The various buddy abilities were praised for encouraging exploration outside of combat, but were criticized for becoming repetitive and not challenging. PC Gamer, VideoGamer.com, and Polygon appreciated the scale of customization offered, giving the player ownership over their player-character and choice of companions throughout the game. Similarly, reviewers liked the Artifact/Upgrade system for allowing the New Kid to be customized to the player's needs and for being independent of costumes, so the player could design the New Kid as they desired—although EGM was critical that Artifacts became less important later in the game when the New Kid is more powerful. Game Informer said tracking down selfies with the town's residents was one of the best sidequests, which PC Gamer called "strangely compelling".

=== Sales ===
In October 2017 in North America, South Park: The Fractured but Whole was the fourth-best-selling game across all available platforms, the third-best-selling game on PlayStation 4, and the fourth-best-selling game on Xbox One. The Fractured but Whole's global digital sales made it the eighth-best-selling game for consoles in October 2017. Alongside other single-player games, Assassin's Creed Origins and Middle-earth: Shadow of War, South Park: The Fractured but Whole contributed over $160 million in digital sales for the month. Intelligence firm SuperData said single-player games would not stay high in the charts for long as they were not as easy to monetize through microtransactions as multiplayer video games. It was also among the top 100 highest-grossing games of 2017 on the Steam digital distribution platform.

During the first week of sales in the United Kingdom, The Fractured but Whole became the third-best-selling game on all available formats in terms of boxed sales, behind FIFA 18 at number two and the debuting Gran Turismo Sport at number one, and ahead of the debuting WWE 2K18. The game's first-week sales were 7% below those of The Stick of Truth. Its sales were considered strong, based on the competing titles released at the time. It was the overall sixth-best-selling game of October 2017 in the UK. By its second week it had fallen to eighth place overall, and by its third week it had left the top ten games overall, listing at twelfth place on that chart.

=== Accolades ===
In 2016, MCV and IGN named South Park: The Fractured but Whole the best role-playing game of that year's Electronic Entertainment Expo. The game was nominated for "Best RPG" at the Gamescom 2017 Awards, and for Best Role Playing Game at the 2017 The Game Awards, losing to Persona 5. It was also nominated for "Best Narrative Design", "Best Adventure/Role-Playing Game", and "Best Interpretation" at the Titanium Awards, losing two of them to Horizon Zero Dawn and one to The Legend of Zelda: Breath of the Wild; and in IGN's staff-nominated, user-voted "Best of 2017" series, for Best Xbox One Game, and Best RPG. The game won the "Best Collectibles" award in Game Informer's 2017 RPG of the Year Awards; in their Reader's Choice Best of 2017 Awards, it came in second place for "Best Role-Playing Game". EGM ranked the game 12th on their list of the 25 Best Games of 2017. It was nominated for "Excellence in Convergence" at the 2018 SXSW Gaming Awards.
