= Take a Pair of Private Eyes =

1966 British television series

- Genre: Crime comedy
- Written by: Peter O'Donnell
- Directed by: Christopher Barry
- Starring: Derek Fowlds; Jeanne Roland; Sam Kydd
- Country of origin: United Kingdom
- Original language: English
- No. of series: 1
- No. of episodes: 6

Production
- Producer: Alan Bromly
- Running time: 55 minutes

Original release
- Network: BBC 2
- Release: 10 April – 15 May 1966

Take a Pair of Private Eyes is a British crime comedy television series that originally aired on BBC 2 in six episodes from 10 April to 15 May 1966. It was written by Peter O'Donnell, best known as the creator of Modesty Blaise. The title is a reference to the Gilbert and Sullivan song Take a Pair of Sparkling Eyes. In the style of The Thin Man it focuses on Ambrose and Dominique Fraynes a husband and wife who run a private detective agency assisted by his father Hector.

== Cast ==
- Derek Fowlds as Ambrose Frayne
- Jeanne Roland as Dominique Frayne
- Sam Kydd as Hector Frayne
- Henry McGee as Charles
- Bridget Armstrong as Cornelia
- John Bryans as Feinster
- John Sharp as Crozier
- Peter Forbes-Robertson as Roger Curran
- Ivor Salter as M Brienne
- Campbell Singer as Inspector Roth
- George Lee as Police constable
- Victor Maddern as Cokey Brock
- Jeanne Moody as Marian
- Margaret Nolan as Doreen
- John Cater as Lyall Sankey
- Yvonne Ball as Barmaid
- Alexandra Dane as Girl
- Roy Denton as Sam
- Peter Diamond as Thug
- James Fairley as Butler
- Clare Jenkins as Girl in pub
- Edward Jewesbury as Inspector Marshall
- Tom McCall as Musician
- Brian Moorehead as Police sergeant
- Derek Price as Musician
- John Quarmby as Detective sergeant
- John Rapley as Hearse driver
- Harry Tardios as Manzella
- Francesca Tu as Japanese girl
- Del Watson as Thug
- Gabrielle Wheeler as Maid

== Bibliography ==
- Baskin, Ellen . Serials on British Television, 1950-1994. Scolar Press, 1996.
- Reilly, John M. Twentieth Century Crime & Mystery Writers. Springer, 2015.
