= Le Pétomane (film) =

1979 British short comedy film

- Directed by: Ian MacNaughton
- Screenplay by: Ray Galton and Alan Simpson
- Produced by: Steve Bentinck; Robin Courage; Peter Eton
- Starring: Leonard Rossiter
- Edited by: Bob Dearberg
- Production company: Legionnaire Films
- Release date: 1979
- Running time: 33 minutes
- Country: United Kingdom
- Language: English

Le Pétomane is a 1979 British short tragicomic biographical film directed by Ian MacNaughton and starring Leonard Rossiter. It was written by Ray Galton and Alan Simpson based on the life of Le Pétomane, the stage name of the 19th century French flatulist (professional farter) and entertainer Joseph Pujol who was famous for his remarkable control of the abdominal muscles, which enabled him to seemingly fart at will and whose 'farting' performances at the Moulin Rouge in Paris drove his audiences to hysterics.

== Synopsis ==
Joseph Pujol is a professional farter billed as Le Pétomane who is able to orchestrate his farts to music, to the delight of his Parisian audiences. By ingesting charcoal Pujol is able to generate the gastric gases essential for his stage act. For years he is the Toast of Paris, but with the passing years he loses his muscular control, causing his act to fail in a cacophony of flatulent explosions.

== Cast ==
- Leonard Rossiter as Le Pétomane
- Ronald Fletcher as narrator
- Madeleine Bellamy
- John D. Collins
- Michael Cronin
- Alexandra Dane
- Kalman Glass
- John Harvey
- Alun Lewis
- Victor Lucas
- Roland MacLeod
- Nancy Nevinson
- Michael Ripper
- Gordon Rollings
- Graham Stark
- Bob Todd

== Release ==
Le Pétomane was theatrically releasedin the UK in 1979 as the support film to The Warriors.

== Reception ==
The British Film Institute wrote: "Leonard Rossiter is excellent here playing Joseph Pujol, a 19th century French music hall artist who made a fine art of farting, so the story goes, in this strangely effective short comedy biopic, piquantly penned by Hancock scripters Ray Galton and Alan Simpson. Galton and Simpson’s great skill at wringing emotion and sentiment from the most curious and unlikely of raw material – oft demonstrated in their perennially popular comedies Hancock’s Half Hour and Steptoe and Son – is writ large here, in this oddly affecting tragicomic biopic."

Screen International called the film "a rather naughty short ... It's fun, but don't take Aunt Edna."

Christopher Howse wrote in the Sunday Telegraph that the film "wasn't funny. At first the performance produced a ghastly fascination, then a creepy discomfort."
