= Bumbulum =

Musical instrument

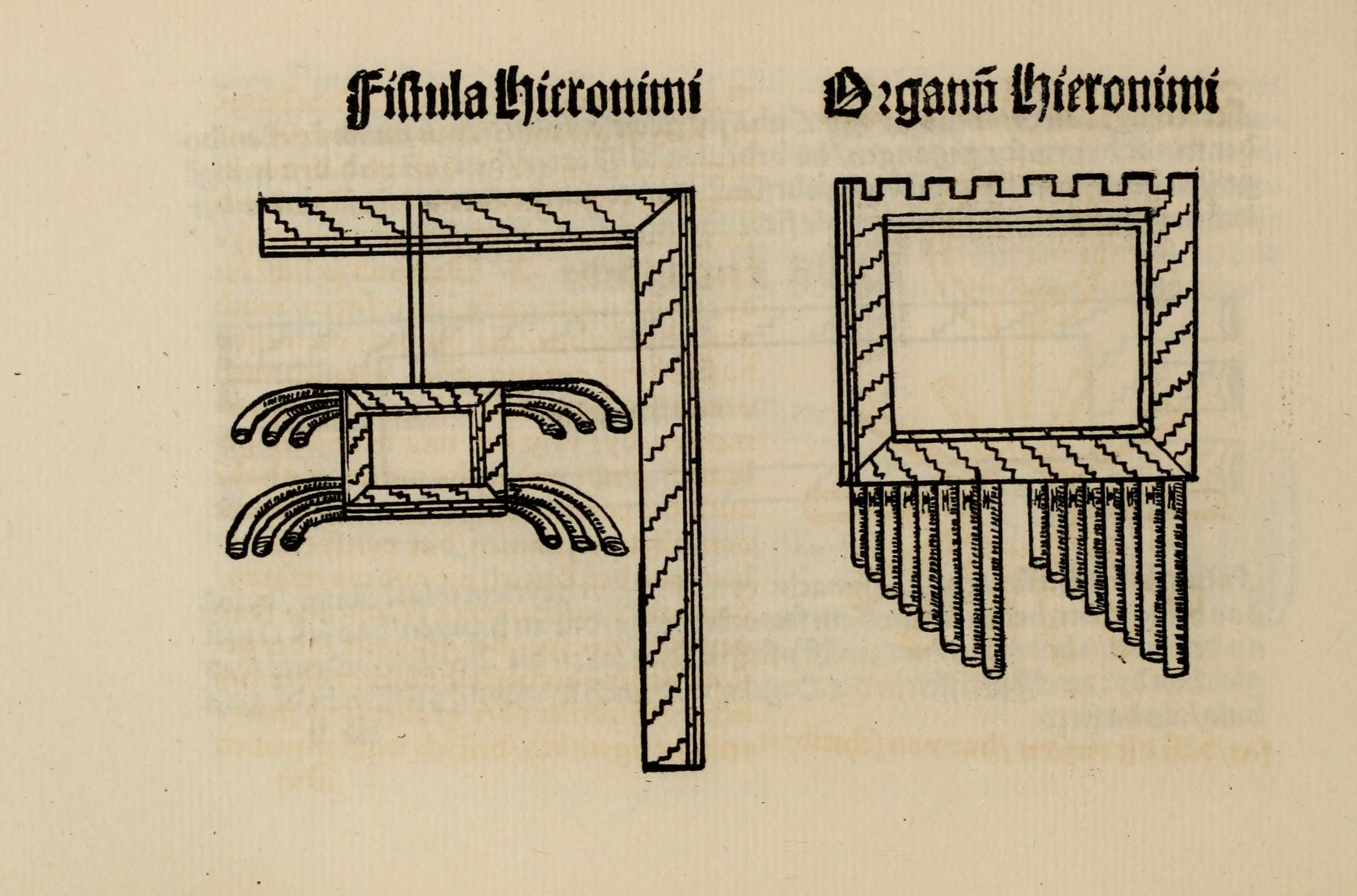
Fistual of Jerome or Fistula Hieronimi (left) and Organ of Jerome or Organum Hieronimi illustrated in Musica getutscht by Sebastian Virdung.

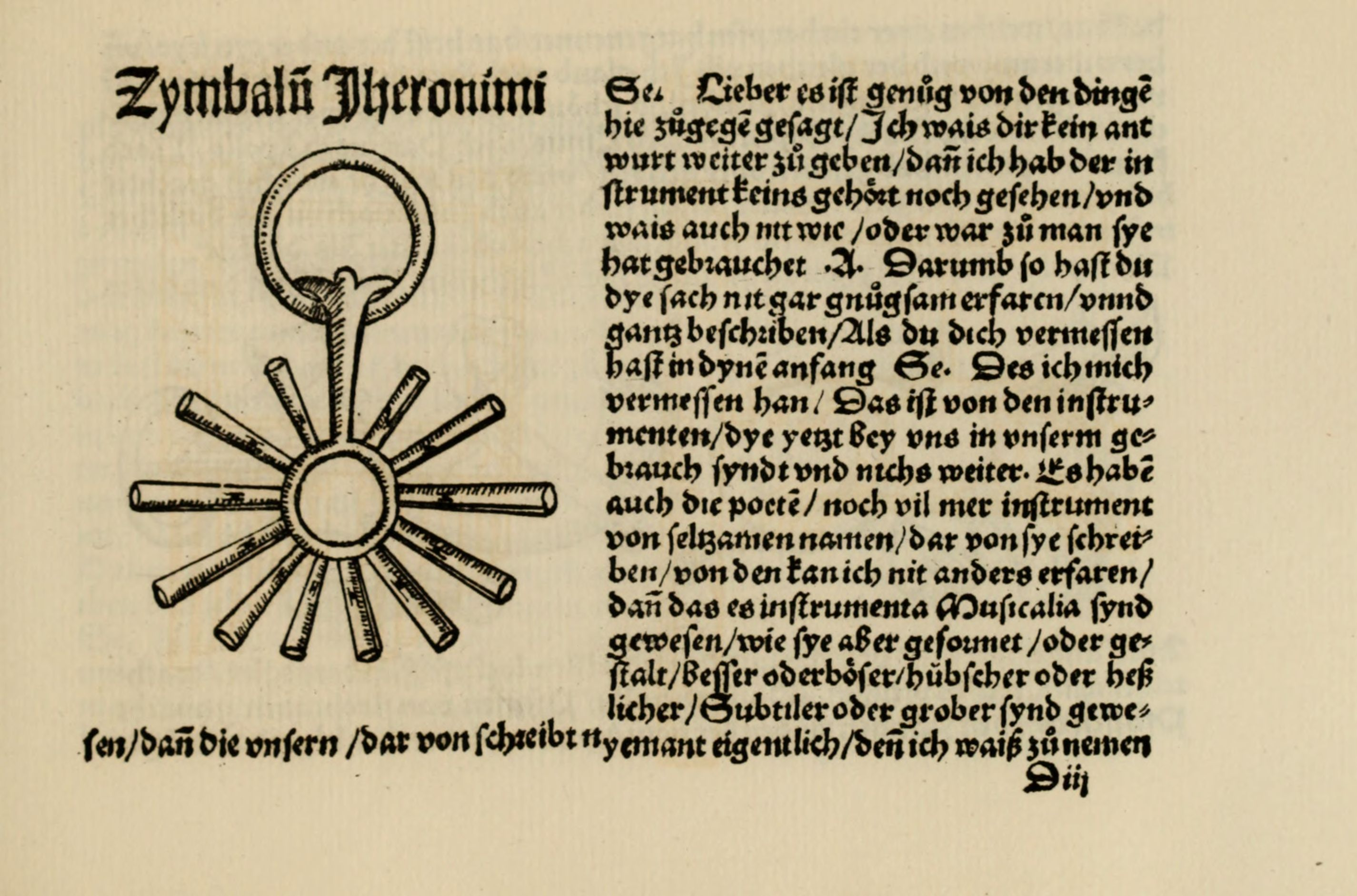
Cymbalum of Jerome (Zymbalum Iheronimi), illustrated in Musica getutscht by Sebastian Virdung.

The bumbulum or bombulum was a musical instrument described in an apocryphal letter of St. Jerome to Caius Posthumus Dardanus, and illustrated in a series of illuminated manuscripts of the 10th to the 11th century, together with other instruments described in the same letter. The name may also be transcribed bunibula or bunibulum.

Early manuscripts include the Psalter of Emmeran, 10th century, described by Martin Gerbert, who gives a few illustrations from it; the Cotton manuscript of Tiberius C. VI in the British Museum, 11th century; the famous Boulogne Psalter, A.D. 1000; and the Angers Psalter, 9th century.

In the Cotton manuscript the instrument consists of an angular frame, from which depends by a chain a rectangular metal plate having twelve bent arms attached in two rows of three on each side, one above the other. The arms appear to terminate in small rectangular bells or plates, and it is supposed that the standard frame was intended to be shaken like a sistrum in order to set the bells jangling. Sebastian Virdung gives illustrations of these instruments of Jerome, and among them of the one called bumbulum in the Cotton Manuscript, which Virdung calls Fistula Hieronimi. The general outline is the same, but instead of metal arms there is the same number of bent pipes with conical bore. Virdung explains, following the apocryphal letter, that the stand resembling the draughtsman's square represents the Holy Cross, the rectangular object dangling therefrom signifies Christ on the Cross, and the twelve pipes are the twelve apostles. Virdung's illustration, probably copied from an older work in manuscript, conforms more closely to the text of the letter than does the instrument in the Cotton manuscript. There is no evidence whatever of the actual existence of such an instrument during the Middle Ages, with the exception of this series of fanciful pictures drawn to illustrate an instrument known from description only.

== Manuscripts illustrating Saint Jerome's Instruments of Hieronymus or imitating those illustrations ==
St Jerome wrote a letter to Dardanus (a Gallic Christian), to explain pagan and Christian musical instruments that are mentioned in the Bible and their allegorical meanings. The letter was illustrated in the 9th century A.D. in the Benedictine abbey of Saint Emmeram in Ratisbon (present-day Regensburg), Bavaria. The illustrator's tried to illustrate what was described in the letter.

It isn't certain whether all were real instruments or allegories for Christian values (for instance a tuba is illustrated with three mouthpieces for the Father, the Son and the Holy Ghost to all blow through, and four exits (one for each of the Four Gospels or Four Evangelists).

The illustrations would be included and redrawn in other medieval and renaissance manuscripts.

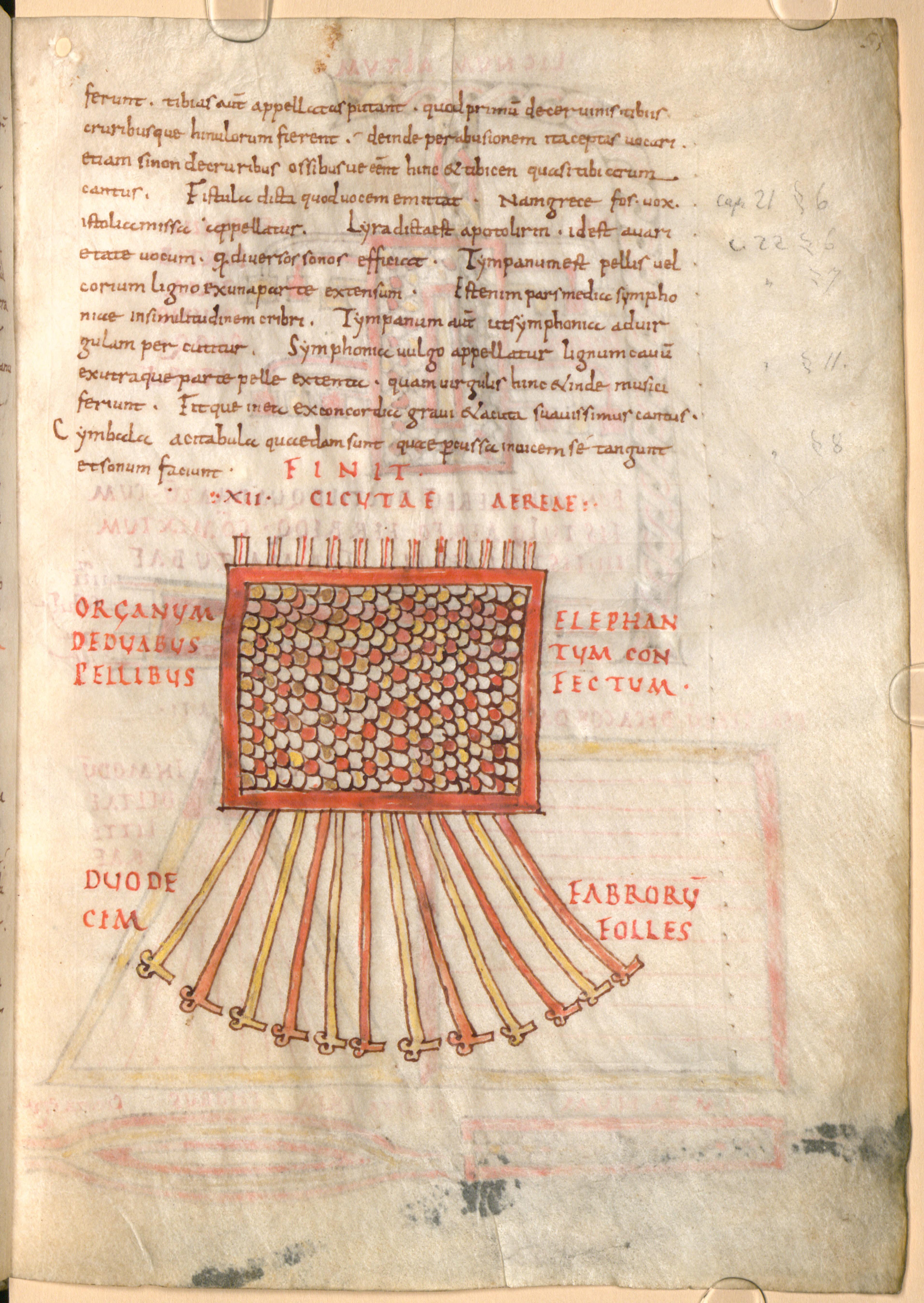
Circa 850-875 A.D., Benedictine Abbey of Saint Emmeran, Germany. Image 109 of Saint Jerome's "Instruments of Hieronymus" (Psalter of Emmeran. BSB shelfmark: Clm 14523)

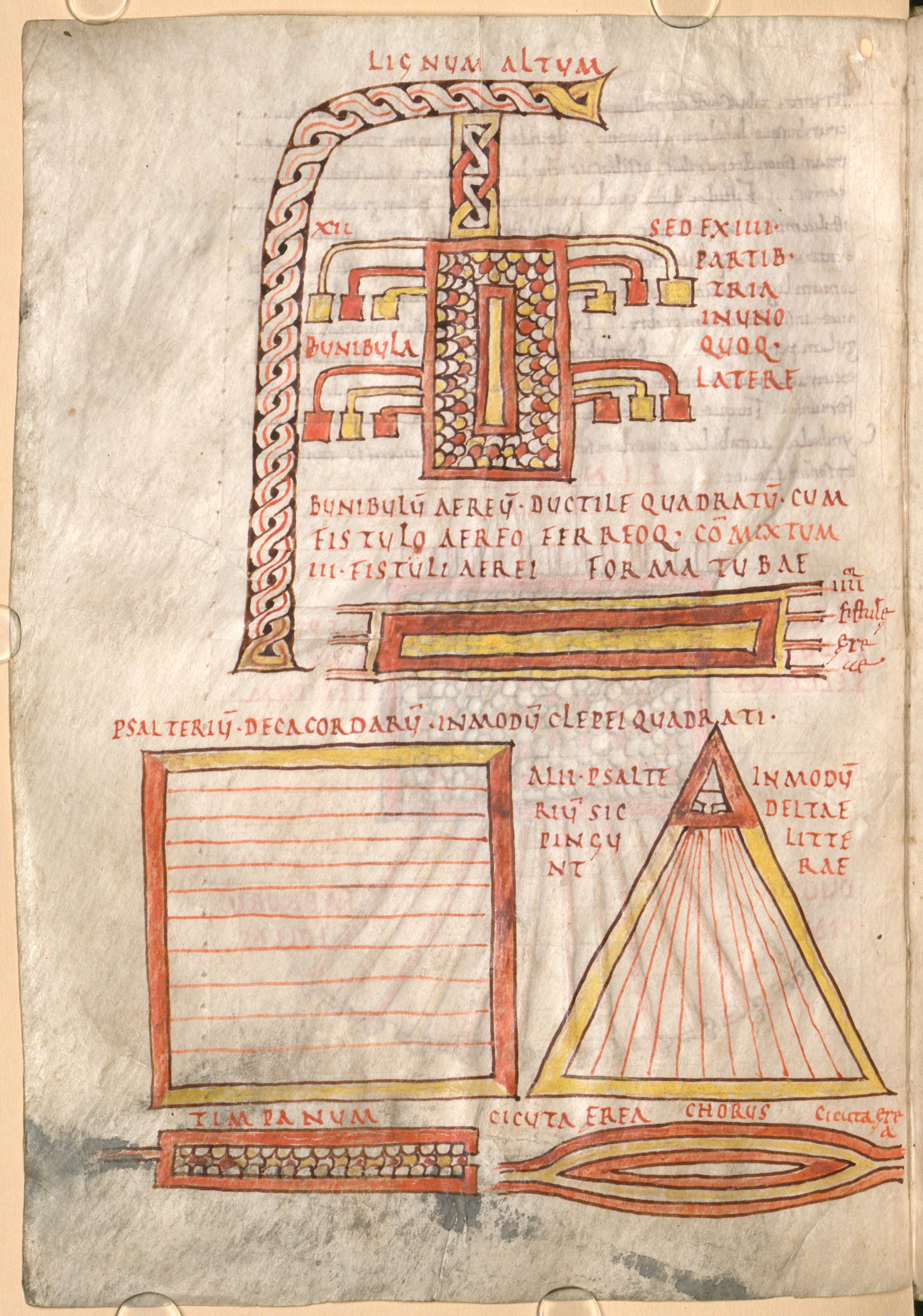
Circa 850-875 A.D., Benedictine Abbey of Saint Emmeran, Germany. Image 110 of Saint Jerome's "Instruments of Hieronymus" (Psalter of Emmeran. BSB shelfmark: Clm 14523)

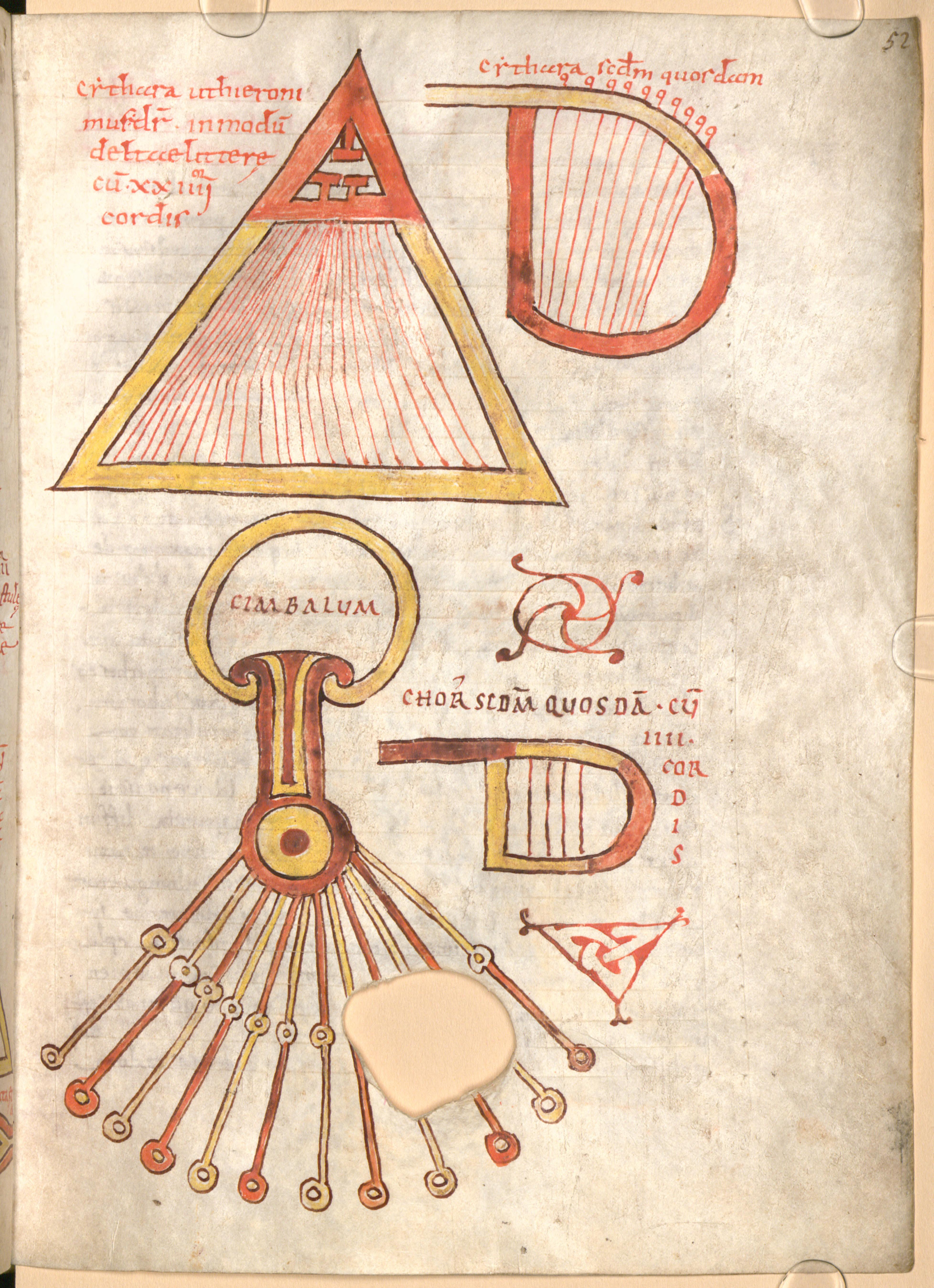
Circa 850-875 A.D., Benedictine Abbey of Saint Emmeran, Germany. Image 111 of Saint Jerome's "Instruments of Hieronymus" (Psalter of Emmeran. BSB shelfmark: Clm 14523)

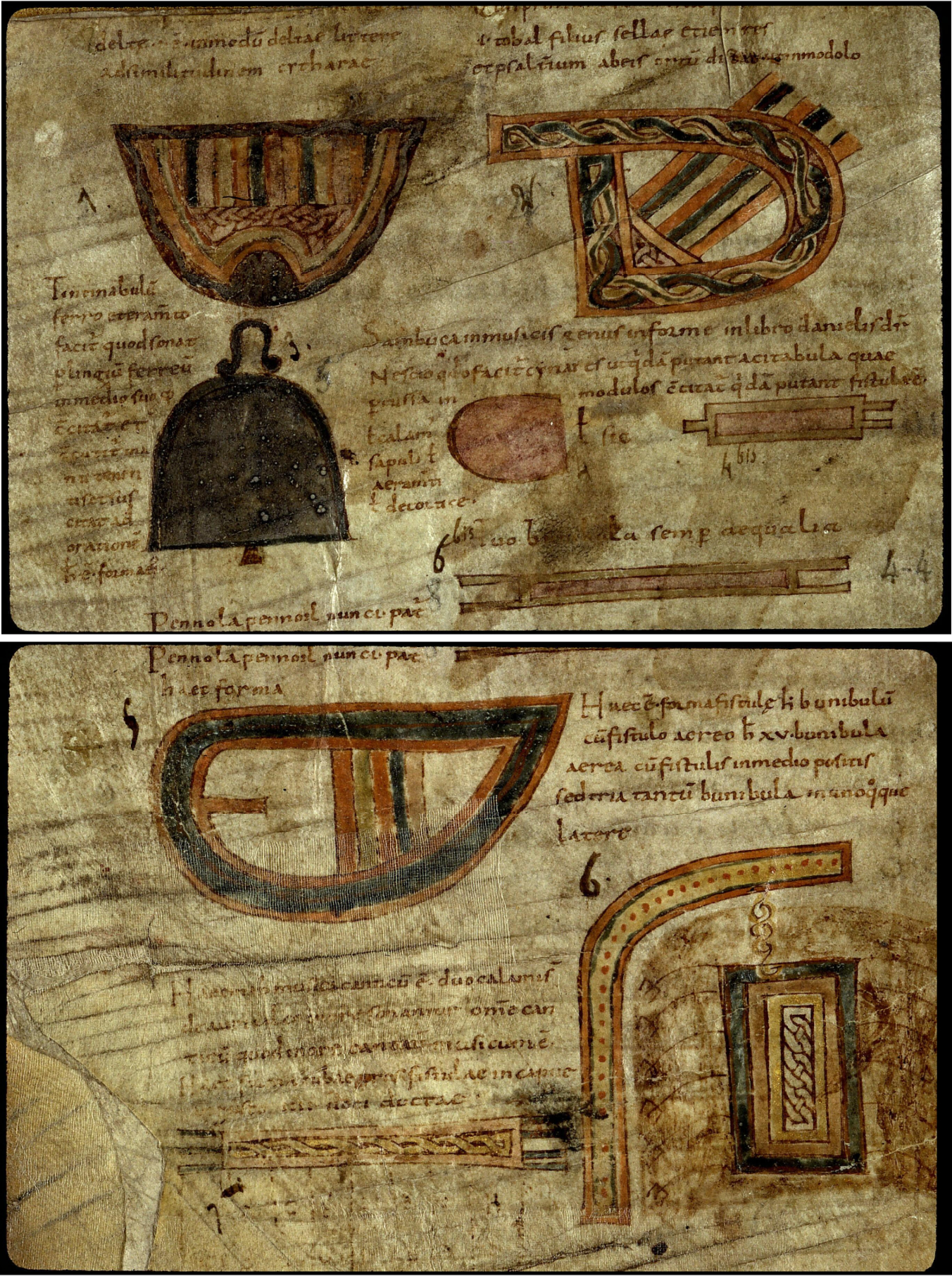
Circa 842-850, Northern France. Benedictine Psalter or Angers Psalter, Angers, BM, 0018 (0014) folio 12v

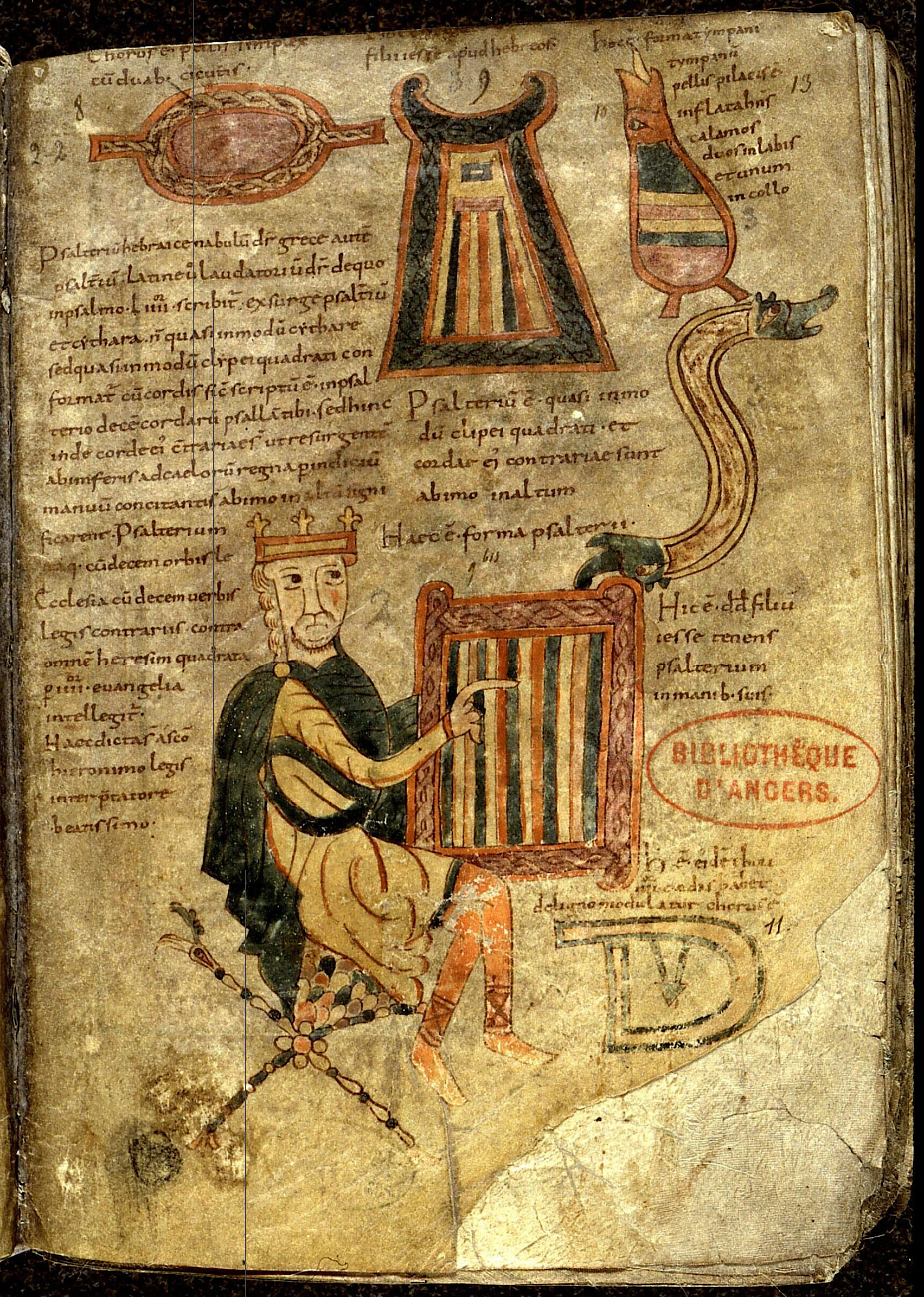
842-850 A.D., Northern France. Benedictine Psalter or Angers Psalter, Angers, BM, 0018 (0014) folio 13r.

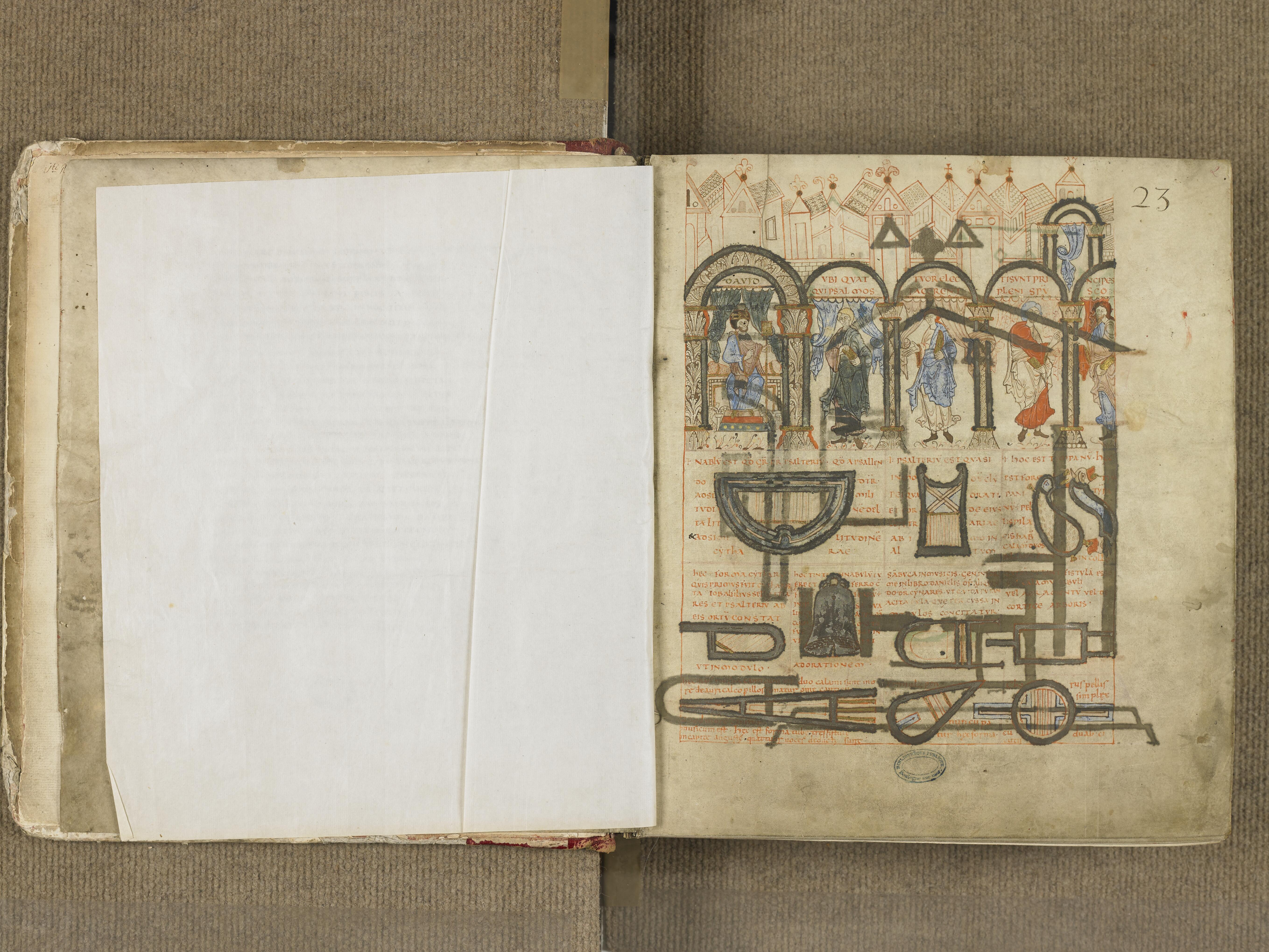
Circa 999 A.D. Odbert Psalter or Boulogne Psalter, Bibliotheque Municipale, 20, folio 2r.

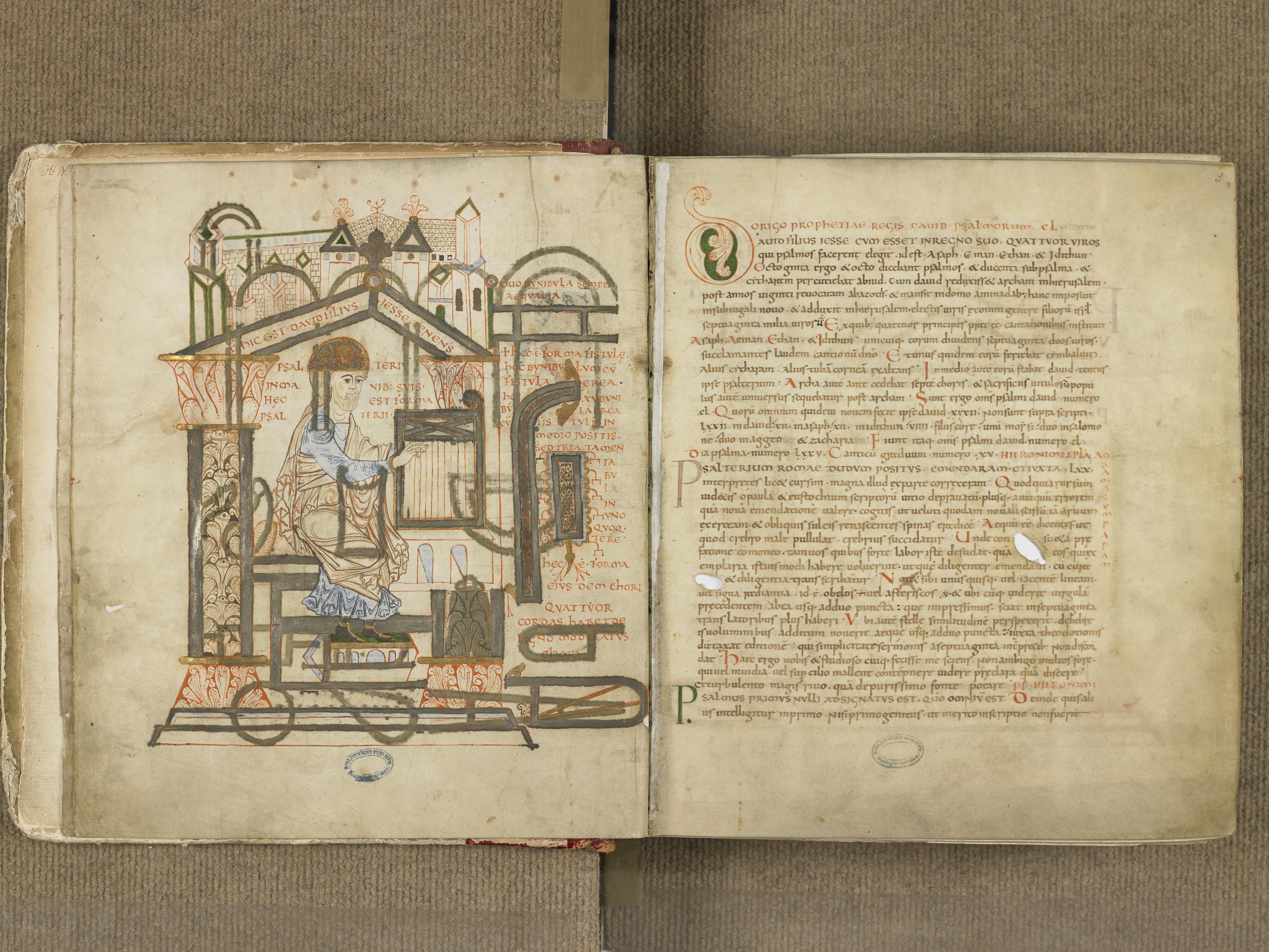
Circa 999 A.D. Odbert Psalter or Boulogne Psalter, Bibliotheque Municipale, 20, folio 2v.

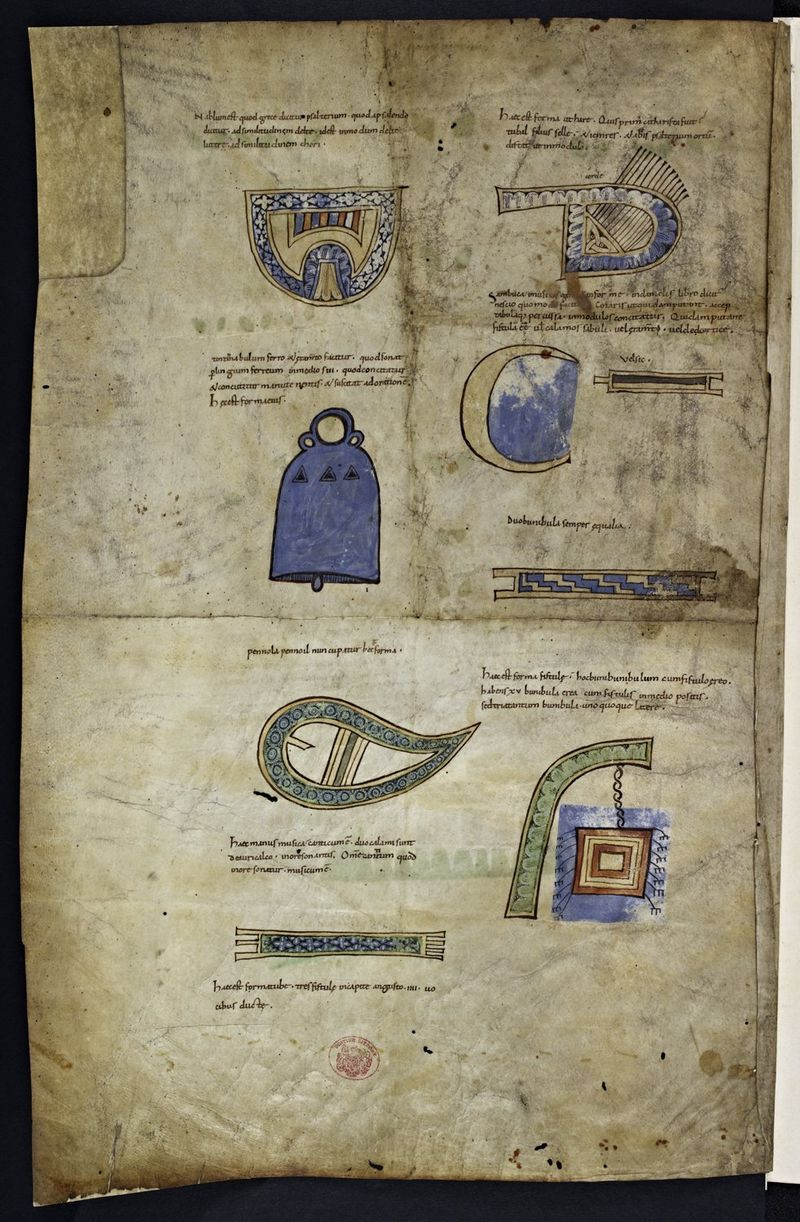
11-12th century A.D. Musical instruments from British Library, Add MS 47683, folio. 1v

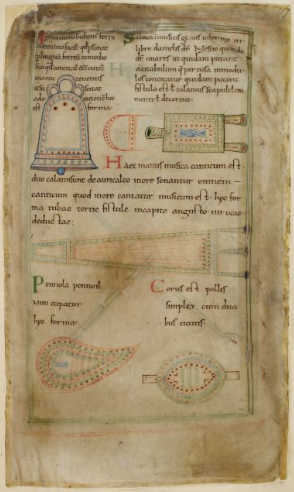
11th century A.D. Tiberius Psalter (Cotton manuscript of Tiberius C. vi), folio 17r

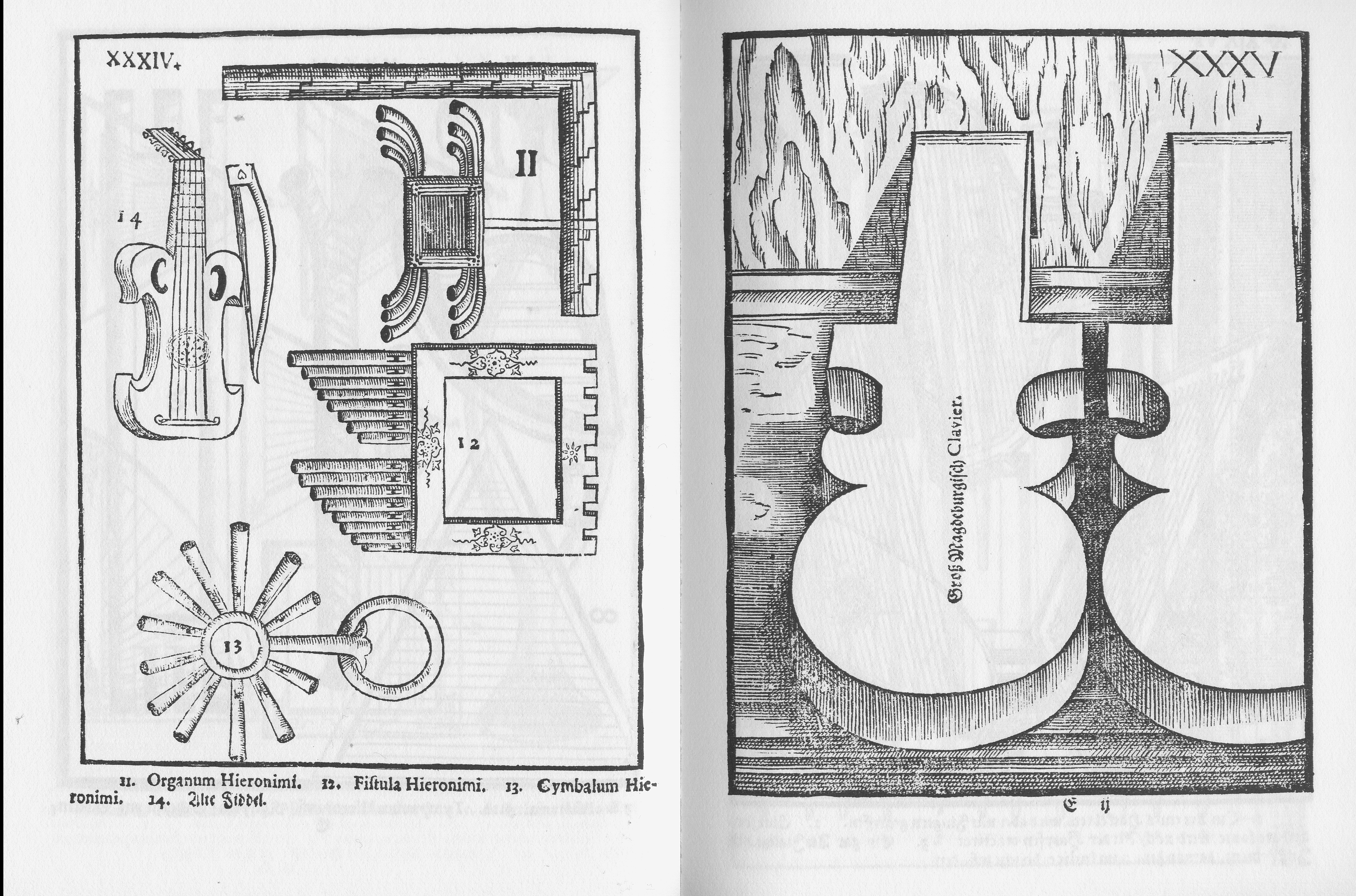
1620 Germany. Left side shows illustrations from Michael Praetorius' Syntagma Musicum Theatrum Instrumentorum seu Sciagraphia

From the text accompanying the pictures, the instruments may be grouped. Names may not precisely match known instruments; for example in the earlier medieval era, cythara functioned as a generalized word for a stringed instrument (including the lyre, and possibly psaltery and lute).

- Organum (See:pipe organ)
- Fistula
  - bunibulum
  - bumbulum
  - altum lignum
- Psalterium (See: Psaltery)
  - Psalterium decadordum
- Tuba (See: Roman tuba)
  - Forma Tubae
  - Fistule eree
  - Tuba Hieronimi
- Tympanum
  - Tympanum Heronimi
- Chorus (wind instrument like a tuba)
  - Cicuta aerea
- Cithara (See: Cythara and Cithara)
  - Cythara ut Hieronimus
  - Cythara secundum quosdam
  - Cythara ut Hieronimus
  - Alia cytera Hieronimi
- Cymbalum (See: Cymbals)
- Chorus (stringed instrument)
- Tintinnabulum (bell)

== Etymology ==
=== Bagpipe or organ ===
The word bombulum was probably derived from the same root as the bombaulios (βομβαύλιος) of Aristophanes (Acharnians, 866), a comic compound for a bag-pipe with a play on an insect that hums or buzzes. The original described in the letter, also from hearsay, was probably an early type of organ.

=== Flatulists ===
The term was also used for flatulists. According to a draft made by David Trotter for the Dictionary of Medieval Latin from British Sources, bumbulum may be named due to its sound resembling that of flatulence: an event was recorded in 1250, about the king's court on Christmas Day in 1173. Trotter quoted a Latin extract from the Liber Feodorum or Book of Fees in which the word was used; "Roland le Pettour had to perform the service of bumbulum to the king on Christmas Day in order to have the right to hold his land."

Seriantia que quondam fuit Rollandi le Pettour in Hemingeston in comitatu Suff', pro qua debuit facere die Natali Domini singulis annis coram domino rege unum saltum et sifflettum et unum bumbulum, que alienata fuit per particulas subscriptas.

Translation:

The following (lands), which formerly were held of Roland the Farter in Hemingston in the county of Suffolk, for which he was obliged to perform every year on the birthday of our Lord before his master the king, one jump, one whistle, and one fart, were alienated in accordance with these specific requirements.

=== Animal noises ===
Bumbul in bumbulum may also be related to the bumble in bumblebee, for the buzzing sound, and to boom as in the noise which a bittern can make.
