= Alexandra Dane =

English actress

Alexandra Dane (born c. 1940 in Bethlehem, Free State, South Africa) is an English actress who appeared in many films including Carry On Doctor, Carry On Loving, other Carry On films, The Ups and Downs of a Handyman, Le Pétomane and Terry Gilliam's Jabberwocky.

Her many television appearances include Not On Your Nellie, Alas Smith and Jones and Pulaski. In 1975, Dane took the part of Nefertiti Skupinski, described as "O'Brien's voluptuous, South African-bred daughter", in The Melting Pot. This was a sitcom written by Spike Milligan and Neil Shand, which was cancelled by the BBC after just one episode had been broadcast.

On stage, she appeared in summer seasons at British seaside resorts such as Torquay and Blackpool, in repertory theatres and with the Shakespeare Theatre Group. She is also interested in painting and sculpting and was married to the Scottish sculptor David McFall until his death.

== Filmography ==
=== Film ===
| Year | Title | Role | Notes |
|---|---|---|---|
| 1963 | That Kind of Girl | | |
| 1964 | Goldfinger | Flying Circus Pilot | Uncredited |
| 1967 | Carry On Doctor | Ante-Natal Instructor | Uncredited |
| 1968 | Don't Raise the Bridge, Lower the River | Masseuse | |
| 1968 | Corruption | Sandy | |
| 1968 | Carry On Up the Khyber | Busti | |
| 1969 | Carry On Again Doctor | Stout Woman | |
| 1970 | Carry On Loving | Emily | |
| 1973 | The Creeping Flesh | Whore | |
| 1975 | Carry On Behind | Lady in low-cut dress | |
| 1975 | The Ups and Downs of a Handyman | Mrs. Knowles | |
| 1977 | Jabberwocky | Landlord's Wife | |
| 1979 | Le Pétomane | | |

=== Television ===
| Year | Title | Role | Notes |
|---|---|---|---|
| 1962 | The Dickie Henderson Show | | Episode: "The Romance" |
| 1962 | Harpers West One | Fenella Best | 1 episode |
| 1963 | Best of Friends | | Episode: "Star Struck" |
| 1963 | Ghost Squad | Party guest | Episode: "Mr. Five Per Cent" |
| 1964 | The Saint | Mathilde | Episode: "The Good Medicine" |
| 1965 | Londoners | Lucie | Episode: "Just Call Me Lucky" |
| 1965 | Riviera Police | Waitress | Episode: "Duet for Two Guns" |
| 1966 | No Hiding Place | Sandra Hooper | Episode: "The Lifer" |
| 1966 | Two of a Kind | Lil | 1 episode |
| 1966 | Take a Pair of Private Eyes | Girl | 1 episode |
| 1969–1970 | The Doctors | Nella Somers | 19 episodes |
| 1970 | The Wednesday Play | Lexy | Episode: "Wine of India" |
| 1971 | From a Bird's Eye View | Madame Dupont | Episode: "Hurricane Millie" |
| 1972 | Dear Mother...Love Albert | Brenda | Episode: "Trouble at t'Mill" |
| 1974 | Not On Your Nellie | Beryl | 7 episodes |
| 1976 | The Melting Pot | Nefertiti | 7 episodes |
| 1976 | The Two Ronnies | Woman Being Chased | 1 episode |
| 1977 | The Upchat Line | Editor | Episode: "Pulling" |
| 1978–1979 | Hazell | Girl on Boat/Moira | 2 episodes |
| 1983 | The Climber | Mrs. Western | 1 episode |
| 1985 | The Tripods | Fatima | 2 episodes |
| 1986–1987 | Alas Smith & Jones | Various roles | 7 episodes |
| 1987 | Pulaski | Health Farm Guest | Episode: "The Price of Fame" |
