= The Melting Pot (TV series) =

British TV sitcom pilot (BBC1, 1976)

- Genre: Sitcom
- Written by: Spike Milligan; Neil Shand
- Starring: Spike Milligan
- Country of origin: United Kingdom
- Original language: English
- No. of series: 1
- No. of episodes: 1

Original release
- Network: BBC1
- Release: 11 June 1975

The Melting Pot is a British television situation comedy starring Spike Milligan. It was written by Milligan and his regular collaborator Neil Shand. The pilot episode was broadcast only once by BBC1 in June 1975, with a full series recorded for transmission in August 1976, but never broadcast.

Milligan played Mr. Van Gogh (in brownface) alongside John Bird as Mr. Rembrandt, father and son illegal Asian immigrants who are first seen being rowed ashore in England, having been told that the beach is in fact Piccadilly Circus. They hitch a ride to London in a lorry advertising Italian-made Yorkshire puddings, and find themselves in a bookies thinking it is a restaurant. After being redirected, the duo end up at a boarding house in the fictional Piles Road, London WC2, run by Irish coalman Paddy O'Brien (Frank Carson) and his voluptuous daughter Nefertiti. The rest of the tenants include a black Yorkshireman, a Chinese cockney and a Scottish Arab. The "Melting Pot" of the title refers to the district of London where they have arrived.

The pilot episode, produced by Roger Race, was broadcast on BBC1 at 9:25 pm on 11 June 1975, and was followed by a recording of a full series of six episodes to be broadcast in 1976. Roger Race was replaced as director by Ian McNaughton, who had previously worked on Milligan's Q5 and Q6 series. However, the series was never transmitted. Milligan speculated that the programmes were perhaps insufficiently funny, or that cast changes made following the pilot episode had been an unwise decision. However, the popular consensus seems to be that the BBC disliked the racially insensitive nature of the series as a whole. A book of the scripts of the series was published in 1983 by Robson Books, with illustrations by the cartoonist Bill Tidy, and Milligan later reused some of the situations and characters in his 1987 comic novel The Looney. The pilot episode remains in the BBC's archives in the form of a low-band U-matic video recording, while the seven-episode series was preserved on the original broadcast standard video tape. The series was also featured on a list of the top 20 unfunniest British comedies.

== Cast ==
- Spike Milligan as Mr Van Gogh: an illegal Pakistani immigrant
- John Bird as Mr Rembrandt: Van Gogh's son, also an illegal immigrant
- Frank Carson as Paddy O'Brien: an Irish Republican landlord and coalman
- Alexandra Dane as Nefertiti Skupinski: landlady and O'Brien's voluptuous, South African-bred daughter
- Wayne Brown as Luigi O'Reilly: a black Yorkshireman (listed as a Coloured North countryman in the Radio Times)
- Harry Fowler as Eric Lee Fung: a Chinese cockney spiv
- John Bluthal as Richard Armitage: an Orthodox London Jew
- Anthony Brothers as Sheik Yamani: an Orthodox Arab who speaks with a Scots accent as he has been learning banking at the Bank of Scotland, Peckham
- Robert Dorning as Colonel Grope: an ex-Indian Army, alcoholic racialist
- Bill Kerr as Bluey Notts: an Australian bookie's clerk, a crude racialist
- Alister Williamson as the Australian bookie
- Freddie Earrle as an Orthodox Jew
- Rita Webb as the daily help

== See also ==
- List of television series cancelled after one episode
