= A Day Out =

- Porridge episode
- Episode no.: Season 1 Episode 4
- Directed by: Sydney Lotterby
- Written by: Dick Clement and Ian La Frenais
- Original air date: 26 September 1974

Episode chronology
← Previous "A Night In"	Next → "Ways and Means"

"A Day Out" is the fourth episode from the first series of the British sitcom Porridge. It first aired on 26 September 1974, and is the fourth episode of the first series. In this episode, Fletcher and some of his fellow prisoners are allowed out for the day to dig drainage ditches for the local council, only for mishaps to soon occur.

== Synopsis ==
Godber becomes excited that he, Fletcher, and some of the other prisoners will be forming a work party and heading outside of Slade Prison for the day. However, Fletcher is less excited, due to the fact he knows they will be mostly working on digging drainage ditches under the supervision of prison officer Mackay, and that Ives will be part of the party as well, although takes some reassurances that prison officer Barrowclough will be joining them as well. Later that morning, while the men are digging at the side of a local road, Mackay leaves Barrowclough in charge while he heads off in the prison van to run an errand in the nearby village. Although Barrowclough tries to lay down ground rules with the prisoners, the men soon take advantage of him, including taking a smoke break in a nearby church.

When Ives steps out to relieve himself in the churchyard, he swiftly returns claiming he was stung on his bottom by a bee. Fletcher, seeing an opportunity, convinces Barrowclough to send him to the village to buy ointment from a chemist, whereupon he uses the money given to him to buy a pint at the local pub instead, including several packets of crisps for himself and the prisoners. During his time, he conceals the fact he is a prisoner from the barman by claiming he is helping in the construction of a new motorway. Just then, Mackay arrives, much to Fletcher's horror, who narrowly avoids him and heads back to the church with a stolen bike. Unknown to him, Mackay informs the local vicar that he is overseeing a group of prisoners doing local work. The vicar asks his verger to return to the church and lock the doors.

Fletcher soon returns to the church and passes crisps to everyone, lying to Barrowclough about where he was. As the men prepare to head back to work, the group find they have been locked inside, as the verger was unaware of their presence within. The men swiftly try to get out fast, and manage to return to the ditches, ensuring Barrowclough is not reported for the mishap, while making Mackay look very foolish when he fears that the prisoners had escape and calls in for help. That evening, Mackay warns Fletcher that he will be keeping an eye on him, resenting that he was made to look a fool in front of his superior. Once he leaves, Godber informs Fletcher that he stole an altar server's robe, revealing that he intends to use it to protect his clothing whenever Fletcher talks with his mouth full, much to Fletcher's annoyance.

== Episode Cast ==
Actor	Role
Ronnie Barker	Norman Stanley Fletcher
Brian Wilde	Mr Barrowclough
Fulton Mackay	Mr Mackay
Richard Beckinsale	Lennie Godber
Ken Jones	Ives
Paul Angelis	Navy Rum
Philip Jackson	Melvin 'Dylan' Bottomley
Robert Gillespie	Vicar
John Rutland	Verger
Johnnie Wade	Scrounger
Arnold Peters	Chief Prison Officer
Ralph Watson	Landlord
Peggy Mason	Nurse
