= Ways and Means (Porridge) =

- Porridge episode
- Episode no.: Season 1 Episode 5
- Directed by: Sydney Lotterby
- Written by: Dick Clement and Ian La Frenais
- Original air date: 3 October 1974

Episode chronology
← Previous "A Day Out"	Next → "Men Without Women"

"Ways and Means" is an episode of the British sitcom Porridge, made for the BBC. It first aired on 3 October 1974, and is the fifth episode of the first series. In this episode, Fletcher intends to help a new prisoner who has an attitude problem, when they decide to hold a rooftop protest.

== Synopsis ==
Fletcher finds himself working with several other inmates to sew fishing nets, and complains to prison officer Barrowclough about the work while he is supervising them. The two men soon change the subject to new prisoner McLaren — a black Scotsman who is being punished for his recent assault on another prison officer due to severe attitude problems. Later that day, Fletcher bumps into McLaren when leaving his cell, and is threatened by him. Manhandling McLaren into his cell when he is distracted, Fletcher firmly warns him over his attitude, and then talks to him when he calms down. Fletcher advises McLaren about his wild ways, stressing that he is his own worst enemy, but sympathises with him when he learns that the prison governor and the prison's welfare officer will not help him seek counseling for his problems.

Later that day, McLaren gets into an altercation during a football match with a rival player, and is sent off by prison officer Mackay, who is refereeing the game. While watching the match, Barrowclough expresses concern that McLaren will be dropped from the prison team if he continues to behave in this manner. A short while later, Fletcher is informed that McLaren is holding a rooftop protest and refuses to come down. Asking to see the governor, Fletcher convinces him to let him handle the matter and talk him down. Although Mackay protests, the governor agrees. With the help of the local fire service, Fletcher heads up to the roof, and politely asks McLaren how things are. However, Fletcher soon admits to suffering from vertigo and slides down the roof, landing against his groin on a drainage pipe.

A few weeks later, Fletcher now works in the prison library as a reward for his actions and visits the prison infirmary to provide books to those recuperating. While conversing with Ives about the protest, Fletcher admits it was a setup between himself and McLaren — Fletcher devised it to earn his position in the library, while McLaren took part in order to gain sympathy and support from the prison staff. McLaren soon arrives, having been given a position in the infirmary, and reveals that he and Fletcher are now friends, with both men soon making a swap for items that they want — a copy of The Godfather for a bottle of oil of wintergreen.

== Episode Cast ==
Actor	Role
Ronnie Barker	Norman Stanley Fletcher
Brian Wilde	Mr Barrowclough
Fulton Mackay	Mr Mackay
Ken Jones	Ives
Tony Osoba	McLaren
Michael Barrington	Governor
