= New Faces, Old Hands =

- Porridge episode
- Episode no.: Season 1 Episode 1
- Directed by: Sydney Lotterby
- Written by: Dick Clement and Ian La Frenais
- Original air date: 5 September 1974

Episode chronology
← Previous "Prisoner and Escort"	Next → "The Hustler"

"New Faces, Old Hands" is the first episode of British sitcom Porridge, produced for the BBC. It first aired on 5 September 1974, and forms part of the first series of the sitcom. The episode focuses on Norman Stanley Fletcher's arrival at Slade Prison alongside two others, where he attempts to manipulate things to his benefit.

== Synopsis ==
Prison officer Mr Mackay talks to his colleagues about three new arrivals to Slade Prison - the young and naive Lennie Godber, serving his first prison sentence; Cyril Heslop, a rather dim-witted prisoner serving his latest prison sentence; and Norman Stanley Fletcher, an "habitual criminal" who has served time in many prisons. After being informed of the prison routine by Mackay and Fletcher, the group learn that visits from their relatives and family are restricted to once a month, before undergoing a medical examination by a rather sickly doctor, whom Fletcher fails to convince into letting him keep his own shoes.

At lunch, Fletcher is surprised to hear that Godber wants to "go straight" when he leaves prison, despite his youth. After lunch, Fletcher speaks to prison officer Mr Barrowclough over a chance of requesting a favour, due to the fact he had put him in the good graces of the prison governor. Barrowclough, however, refuses to be manipulated into giving him a cushy job in the prison library, despite Fletcher pretending to be offended at such an accusation, but is given a book regarding tropical fish. When the new arrivals are brought to see the Governor, Fletcher takes notice of his fish tank and observes that one of his fish has fin rot, hoping that his ploy will land him a cushy position as a result.

While spending time together in their cell, Mackay arrives with news that Godber is to be given a single cell, much to Fletcher's annoyance. His disappointment is further added to when he learns he must share his cell with a Welsh prisoner whom he describes as a "lunatic who eats light bulbs... Only when he can't get razor blades", and that Godber and Heslop have been awarded easier jobs. When told he has been given special duties by the Governor, Fletcher soon relaxes, believing he is getting a cushy job, but soon discovers that he is to work on the prison's farm, much to his further irritation.

== Episode cast ==
Actor	Role
Ronnie Barker	Norman Stanley Fletcher
Richard Beckinsale	Lennie Godber
Brian Glover	Cyril Heslop
Fulton Mackay	Mr Mackay
Brian Wilde	Mr Henry Barrowclough
John Bennett	Medical Officer
Michael Barrington	Geoffrey Venables (the Governor)

== Note ==
- Actor Brian Glover stated that Heslop's line "I read a book once; green it was" was actually Richard Beckinsale's idea.
