= A Night In =

- Porridge episode
- Episode no.: Episode 3
- Directed by: Sydney Lotterby
- Written by: Dick Clement and Ian La Frenais
- Original air date: 19 September 1974

Episode chronology
← Previous "The Hustler"	Next → "A Day Out"

"A Night In" is an episode of the British sitcom Porridge, made for the BBC. It first aired on 19 September 1974, and is the third episode of the first series. A bottle episode, and the only one in which officers Mackay and Barrowclough did not appear, it focuses on Fletcher finding himself sharing a cell with Godber and developing a friendship with him, despite having to endure a difficult first night with him.

== Synopsis ==
Shortly after receiving a single cell to himself, Fletcher is informed that Godber is to become his new cellmate. Although unhappy, Fletcher soon learns from Godber that his cell block just went through a riot, and that his old cellmate set fire to their beds as a result. Fletcher decides to make clear about the rules within the cell, including the fact that he claims ownership of the top bunk on their beds. After lock-up occurs, Godber admits to Fletcher that he has become depressed with prison life, finding it hard to adjust to it, and is advised to endure their first night together as a "quiet night in", despite how many he has yet to complete.

During the night, Godber struggles to sleep, leading to Fletcher discussing with him about his life, including his daughter Ingrid - who was conceived on the tomb of Karl Marx - and the fact that his three children were born five years apart due to him going away each time. Godber is advised not have any carnal thoughts about women, and instead decides to make a prayer before going to sleep, making it out loud much to Fletcher's chagrin. In the morning, when the cells are opened, Godber swaps his Liquorice allsorts for a squeeze of Fletcher's special toothpaste, during which he thanks Fletcher for helping him get through the night. Cheekily, Fletcher suggest they can have another quiet night that evening, moments before the pair join the other prisoners out on the landing.

== Episode cast ==
Actor	Role
Ronnie Barker	Norman Stanley Fletcher
Richard Beckinsale	Lennie Godber
Paul McDowell	Mr Collinson

== Notes ==
Godber comments that it’s only 7:45pm and barely dark, in fact there is still some light in the sky. However, the first two episodes of Series One are set on New Year’s Eve and New Year’s Day, while dialogue in episode 6 (‘Ways and Means’) states that they’ve only been in Slade Prison for six weeks, meaning that ‘A Night In’ must be set in late January/early February. In the UK at this time of year it would have got dark between 4:00-4:30pm and would have been full dark for nearly four hours by the time of Godber’s comments.
