= John Quarmby =

English actor (1929–2019)

- Born: 18 June 1929; Liverpool, England
- Died: 5 April 2019 (aged 89)
- Occupation: Actor

John Quarmby (18 June 1929 – 5 April 2019) was an English actor.

== Biography ==
Quarmby was born in Liverpool and after two years' national service in the RAF joined RADA in 1949. Repertory work dominated the first twenty years of his career, although he began appearing in television in 1956.

Quarmby played a variety of roles from the 1960s to the 1990s appearing in many long-running drama series such as Z-Cars, Callan, Softly, Softly, Juliet Bravo and Howards' Way. He also appeared in the 1982 television film The Scarlet Pimpernel. He appeared as a prison officer in Porridge in an episode entitled "The Hustler" (1974). He played the role of Mr Carnegie, the Health Inspector in the Fawlty Towers episode "Basil the Rat" (1979) and Henry Tobias (the newspaper editor) in K-9 and Company.

== Selected filmography ==
Year	Title	Role	Notes
1960	Scotland Yard	Plain Clothes Man	Episode: "Night Beat"
1966	Take a Pair of Private Eyes	Detective sergeant	1 episode
1967	Z-Cars	Station Sergeant	Episode: "I Don't Want Evidence"
1971	Get Carter	2nd Gambler	Film, Uncredited
1974	Fall of Eagles	Lamsdorf	Episode: "Dearest Nicky"
1974	Porridge	Prison Officer	Episode: "The Hustler"
1979	Fawlty Towers	Mr. Carnegie	Episode: "Basil the Rat"
1981	K-9 and Company	Henry Tobias	TV movie
1982	The Scarlet Pimpernel	Ponceau	TV movie
1983	Storyboard	Dr Slade	1 Pilot Episode: "Mr. Palfrey of Westminster: The Traitor"
1983	Juliet Bravo	Solicitor	Episode: "Mates"
1983	The Weather in the Streets	Mr. Treadeven	TV movie
1984	A Christmas Carol	Mr Hacking	TV movie
1985	Thirteen at Dinner	Sir Montague's Butler	TV movie
1987	Little Dorrit	Circumlocution Office Porter	Film
1990	The Fool		Film
1994	Black Beauty	Butler	Film
1995	I Don't Speak English		Film
1995	Restoration	The Chancellor	Film
