= The Hustler (Porridge) =

- Porridge episode
- Episode no.: Series 1 Episode 2
- Directed by: Sydney Lotterby
- Written by: Dick Clement; Ian La Frenais
- Original air date: 12 September 1974

Episode chronology
← Previous "New Faces, Old Hands"	Next → "A Night In"

"The Hustler" is an episode of the British sitcom Porridge, produced for the BBC. It first aired on 12 September 1974, and is the second episode of the first series. In this episode, Fletcher and his friends hold an illicit gambling syndicate under Mr Mackay's nose.

== Synopsis ==
While working in the prison farm one morning, Fletcher takes to holding bets with another fellow inmate, Horrible Ives, while at the same time stealing eggs from the farm to swap for better goods. Prison officer Mr Barrowclough visits Fletcher at the farm, and discusses with him the gambling and tobacco rackets run by another inmate, Harry Grout, hoping he will not get involved in such activities. Although Fletcher assures him that he sees gambling as a "mug's game", he later speaks to Godber in the kitchen about joining in a friendly wager. Shortly after Godber refuses to join in, prison officer Mr Mackay arrives and conducts a surprise search of Fletcher. Finding nothing, he then turns his attention to Ives, who is also visiting the kitchen, and finds stolen eggs on him, unaware that Fletcher had handed them over to him earlier.

Later that afternoon, Ives visits Fletcher in the hopes of taking part in a little game he is holding with other inmates, only to be refused a place. However, Fletcher lets him know who is taking part, and when and where the game is taking place, and bets with him that the prison guards will be unable to stop it happening. On a Saturday afternoon, Fletcher meets with inmates Evans, Heslop and Lukewarm in the prison's boiler house to play a game of snakes and ladders for bets. However, Mr Mackay informs Mr Barrowclough of what is happening, believing that gambling causes nothing but problems within prison, and disrupts the game by having a coal delivery take place at that moment.

That evening, Fletcher is left in disgrace with the Governor, who orders him removed from his job at the farm, suspends all his privileges for four weeks, and to be moved to a single cell over concerns his a corrupting influence. Ives soon arrives to collect his winnings, taunting him at being caught out, only to learn that the prison will turn against him upon learning he ratted out Fletcher's actions to the guards. Fletcher refuses to cancel the bet to save Ives from trouble, having the last laugh on him by revealing he had bet with the entire landing that he would land in a single cell by Sunday.

== Episode Cast ==
Actor	Role
Ronnie Barker	Norman Stanley Fletcher
Fulton Mackay	Mr Mackay
Brian Wilde	Mr Barrowclough
Richard Beckinsale	Lennie Godber
Brian Glover	Cyril Heslop
Ken Jones	Ives
Christopher Biggins	Lukewarm
Ray Dunbobbin	Evans
Graham Ashley	Mr Appleton
John Quarmby	Prisoner Officer
