= Le Pétomane =

French entertainer

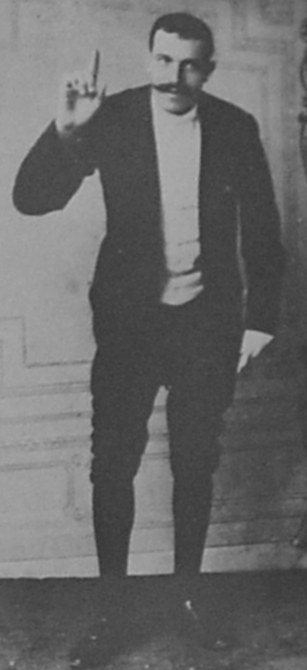
- Born: Joseph Pujol; June 1, 1857; Marseille, France
- Died: August 8, 1945 (aged 88)

Le Pétomane du Moulin Rouge, 1900 (silent film clip)

Joseph Pujol (June 1, 1857 – August 8, 1945), better known by his stage name Le Pétomane (/ləˈpɛtəmeɪn/; French: [ləpetɔman]), was a French flatulist (professional fartist), comedian and entertainer. He was famous for his remarkable control of the abdominal muscles, which enabled him to seemingly fart at will. His stage name combines the French verb péter, "to fart" with the -mane, "-maniac" suffix, which translates to "fartomaniac". The profession is referred to as "flatulist", "farteur", or "fartiste".

It was a common misconception that Pujol passed intestinal gas as part of his stage performance. Rather, he was allegedly able to "inhale" or move air into his rectum and then control the release of that air with his anal sphincter muscles. Evidence of his ability to control those muscles was seen in the early accounts of demonstrations of his abilities to fellow soldiers.

== Early life, family and education ==
Joseph Pujol was born in Marseille, one of five children of stonemason and sculptor François Pujol and his wife Rose, in a family of Catalan origin. Soon after Joseph left school, he had a strange experience while swimming in the sea. He put his head under the water and held his breath, whereupon he felt an icy cold penetrating his rear. He ran ashore in fright and was amazed to sense water pouring from his anus.

While serving in the army, he told his fellow soldiers about his special ability, and repeated it for their amusement, sucking up water from a pan into his rectum and then projecting it up to several yards. He found that he could suck in air as well.

== Career ==
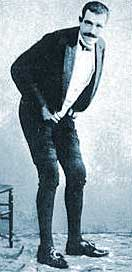
Le Pétomane ca. 1890

Pujol trained as a baker. He would sometimes entertain his customers by imitating musical instruments and claiming to be playing them behind the counter. Pujol decided to try the stage, and debuted in Marseille in 1887. When his act was well received, he moved to Paris, where he appeared at the Moulin Rouge in 1892.

Some of the highlights of his stage act involved sound effects of cannon fire and thunderstorms, as well as playing "'O Sole Mio" and "La Marseillaise" on an ocarina through a rubber tube in his anus. He could also blow out a candle from several yards away. His audience included Albert Edward, Prince of Wales, King Leopold II of the Belgians, and Sigmund Freud.

In 1894, the managers of the Moulin Rouge sued Pujol for an impromptu exhibition he gave to aid a friend struggling with economic difficulties. Pujol was fined 3,000 francs (equivalent to €15,800 in 2025). The Moulin Rouge lost their star attraction, as the disagreement led him to set up his own travelling show, the Théâtre Pompadour.

In the following decade, Pujol tried to 'refine' and make his acts 'gentler'; one of his favourite numbers became a rhyme about a farm, which he himself composed, and which he punctuated with anal renditions of the animals' sounds.

With the outbreak of World War I, Pujol retired from the stage and returned to his bakery in Marseille. Later, he opened a biscuit factory in Toulon.

== Death ==
Pujol died in 1945, aged 88. He was buried in the cemetery of La Valette-du-Var.

== Legacy ==
Le Pétomane left an enduring legacy and has inspired a number of artistic works. These include several musicals based on his life, such as The Fartiste (awarded Best Musical at the 2006 New York International Fringe Festival) and Seth Rozin's A Passing Wind which was premiered at the Philadelphia International Festival of the Arts in 2011. In addition, Le Pétomane was added to David Lee's 2007 reworked revival of the 1953 Broadway play Can-Can, which had originally been written by Abe Burroughs and Cole Porter.

The character has been portrayed several times in film. In 1979, Ian MacNaughton made Le Pétomane, a short humorous film. Written by Galton and Simpson, it was based on Joseph Pujol's story and starred veteran comic actor Leonard Rossiter. The 1983 Italian movie Il Petomane, directed by Pasquale Festa Campanile and starring Ugo Tognazzi, gives a poetic rendition of the character, contrasting his deep longing for normality with the condition of 'freak' to which his act relegated him. The 1998 documentary Le Pétomane by Igor Vamos examines Pujol's place in history through archival films (none of which actually include him), historical documents, photographs, recreations and fake or tongue-in-cheek interviews.

Le Pétomane is referenced in Blazing Saddles, a 1974 satirical Western comedy film directed by Mel Brooks. Brooks appears in multiple supporting roles, including the dim-witted Governor William J. Le Petomane, whose name suggests he is full of hot air.

Le Petoman (without the e, because English-speaking audiences will pronounce –mane differently from –man) was adapted for the theatre in 2001 by Tony Stowers, from the book Le Petomane 1857–1945 by J. Nohain & F. Caradec. It was declined by Hull Truck, Salisbury Playhouse and the National Theatre in the UK on the grounds that they felt their audiences would be 'too sophisticated' for the subject matter. It was read in English in Newcastle upon Tyne in 2005, in Paris in 2010, and in Nantes (in French); in June 2023, it finally made it to the stage with amateur actors.

== See also ==
- Flatulence humor – Form of toilet humor
- Mr. Methane – English entertainer
- Roland the Farter – Medieval English flatulist
- Toilet humour – Humour dealing with defecation, urination and flatulence
