= Little Live "Gotta Go" Pets (brand) =

Moose Toys franchise

- Original "Gotta Go FlaminGO" variant
- Type: Interactive plush toy
- Invented by: Moose Toys
- Company: Moose Toys
- Availability: 2020–present
- Slogan: "Uh-oh, gotta GO!"
- Official website

Little Live "Gotta Go" Pets is a sub-brand manufactured by the Australian toy brand Moose Toys under its "Little Live" smart toy branding. The sub-brand is known for its highly interactive, technologically developed toys of plush animals, some of which use the toilet or engage in toilet humor, reportedly to get child buyers interested in potty training. The "Gotta Go" line of toys, consisting of a flamingo and a turtle in psychedelic colours, were immensely popular in 2021, becoming a sought-after Christmas gift by western shoppers. The toys were also controversial and met with criticism, including by Doug Walker of Nostalgia Critic, who called the toys "disgusting" after viewing a television commercial for the "Gotta Go Turdle" variant.

== "Gotta Go" toy line ==
The Little Live Pets "Gotta Go" toy line began with a large plush "Little Live Gotta Go" flamingo printed in a psychedelic pink fabric with large anime-style eyes. The toy, named Sherbet (after the ice cream), had multiple functions so that its buyer could interact with it. It would "chat" (using smart cloud technology to record, store and play back its owner's voice), sing, dance, and make movements. The toy became more widely known, however, for its function whereby it would pass gas and make alarming noises; when placed on a plastic "potty" device, the toy would emit colourful fake feces into the potty that children could watch through the translucent "potty". These feces would be created from coloured sand that is fed down the toy's throat from a large scoop so that the process can be repeated. The toy was followed up with Shelbert the "Little Live Gotta Go Turdle" (a portmanteau of "turd" and "turtle") that was printed in purple psychedelic fabric and had similar functions to Sherbet the flamingo.

== Reception ==
The "Gotta Go" toy line was praised by magazines, parenting groups and websites both for its crude humor and for its educational value in getting young children interested in potty training. Parenting website Romper included the toy as its primary potty training toy listed for children, saying of it, "look, no one said potty training was glamorous, and yes, you may find yourself owning a "Turdle" who poops a pink sand-like substance into its very own toilet. Honestly, whatever works." Hello! Magazine listed the toy as one of the best "poop-related toys" on the market for potty training in 2021. Parenting websites Scary Mommy and Made For Mums echoed this sentiment about the toys, with Kristen Mae noting that while she personally found the toy repulsive, it appeared to genuinely have children interested in learning how to use the bathroom. She said of her first experience viewing the flamingo variant of the toy, "It was a toilet. This bright pink flamingo was sitting on a tiny plastic toilet, getting ready to take a dump. Okay, cool, so the flamingo is going to pretend to poop. That’s cute. But WAIT. This … was something coming out of that thing’s butt?! As I watched with a mix of fascination and horror, a beige, gooey substance oozed from the flamingo’s bum and into the miniature toilet, which I only then registered was clear so as to enable the viewing of the expulsion of said gooey substance. The flamingo did it! “He [sic] poopin!!” my friend’s toddler squealed for the camera. That kid was positively fucking delighted."

The toy line became one of the most popular 2021 Christmas holiday gifts for children according to New York Magazine, which stated, "In case you don’t remember, last year kids went wild for a pooping pink flamingo that talks, and the year before that, rainbow unicorns that pooped glittery colorful slime were all the rage. This year, according to Appel, we can expect kiddos to go nuts for this turtle named Shelbert that eats, sings, dances, and talks while using the toilet.". Made For Mums and T3 also listed the "Gotta Go" toy line as the best holiday toys of 2021-2022 for Christmas gifts.

== Criticism ==
The "Gotta Go" toy line was also met with criticism from reviewers due largely to the crude humor aspect of the toys, as well as their bizarre physical appearance. Doug Walker of the web series Nostalgia Critic compared the toy line to other poorly received toy lines of the past that involved toilet humour, including "Magic Potty Baby" (A 1992 Tyco Toys brand doll that would leave yellow urine in a plastic pot that disappeared when "flushed"). Walker found the "Gotta Go" toy line "disgusting" and said about it, "Even the kid in the commercial is like, 'I have no idea why this is a thing!' Speaking of which, did you catch the name of this literal stinker? Gotta Go Turdle? Because of course it's called that! ... And it's bad enough that this thing drops a deuce but does it have to look like a Franken Berry tumor? It's gross, it's weird, and not in a good way. I hate this." iNews UK agreed with the criticism over the toy, but argued that such "gross-out" crude humour toys helped children to learn about difficult subjects like potty training and excretion. Totally the Bomb said of the toy, "the hottest toy for Christmas this year just may be the most disgusting toy you’ll find in the store this holiday season", and argued that while the toy was gross, children did seem to enjoy it a great deal.

== Availability ==
The "Gotta Go" toy line is primarily sold on Amazon, while also appearing at Wal-Mart, the Moose Toys website and Canadian retailers Indigo Books and Music and Canadian Tire.
