= The Curse of the Mummy's Tomb =

1964 British horror film by Michael Carreras

- British quad poster
- Directed by: Michael Carreras
- Screenplay by: Michael Carreras; Alvin Rakoff
- Produced by: Michael Carreras
- Starring: Terence Morgan; Fred Clark; Ronald Howard; Jeanne Roland
- Cinematography: Otto Heller
- Edited by: Eric Boyd-Perkins
- Music by: Carlo Martelli
- Production companies: Hammer Film Productions; Swallow Productions
- Distributed by: British Lion-Columbia Distributors
- Release dates: 18 October 1964 (U.K.); 31 December 1964 (U.S.)
- Running time: 80 minutes
- Country: United Kingdom
- Budget: £103,000

The Curse of the Mummy's Tomb is a 1964 British horror film produced, written and directed by Michael Carreras for Hammer Films, starring Terence Morgan, Ronald Howard, George Pastell, Fred Clark and Jeanne Roland.

== Plot ==
"Egypt in the year 1900". The mummy of Ra-Antef, son of Ramesses VIII, is discovered by three Egyptologists: Englishmen John Bray and Sir Giles Dalrymple, and French Professor Eugene Dubois. Assisting in the expedition is Dubois' daughter, and Bray's fiancée, Annette, herself an Egyptology expert. All the artifacts are brought back to London by the project's backer, American showman Alexander King, who plans to recoup his investment by staging luridly sensational public exhibits of the Egyptian treasures. Soon after arrival, however, the mummy revives and starts to kill various members of the expedition, while it becomes evident that sinister Adam Beauchamp, a wealthy arts patron whom members of the expedition meet on the ship returning to England, harbours a crucial revelation of the mummy's past and future.

== Cast ==
- Terence Morgan as Adam Beauchamp, a secretive key character
- Ronald Howard as John Bray, the Egyptologist
- Fred Clark as Alexander King, the American promoter
- Bernard Rebel as Professor Eugene Dubois (uncredited; he died three weeks before the film's UK premiere)
- Jeanne Roland as Annette Dubois, daughter of Professor Dubois, and John Bray's fiancée
- George Pastell as Hashmi Bey, representative of Egypt's colonial government and worshipful supplicant of the Mummy
- Jack Gwillim as Sir Giles Dalrymple, another Egyptologist
- John Paul as Inspector Mackenzie
- Dickie Owen as Ra-Antef the Mummy
- Jill Mai Meredith as Jenny, Beauchamp's maid
- Michael Ripper as Achmed, Egyptian servant
- Harold Goodwin as Fred, one of Alexander King's workmen
- Jimmy Gardner as Fred's mate
- Vernon Smythe as Jessop, Beauchamp's butler
- Marianne Stone as Hashmi Bey's landlady
- Ray Austin as Stuntman, assassin on board ship

== Production ==
Hammer Studios originally offered the project to Universal Pictures in 1963. The film credits Henry Younger as the screenwriter, while the screenplay was written by Michael Carreras and Alvin Rakoff.

== Release ==
The Curse of the Mummy's Tomb was released on 18 October 1964 by Columbia Pictures/BLC Films in support of The Gorgon. The film was distributed by Columbia Pictures in the United States on 17 February 1965 also in support of The Gorgon.

In North America, the film was released on 14 October 2008 along with three other Hammer horror films on the 2-DVD set Icons of Horror Collection: Hammer Films (ASIN: B001B9ZVVC) by Sony Pictures Home Entertainment, and on a double feature Blu-ray with The Revenge of Frankenstein by Mill Creek Entertainment in September 2016. Its title was misspelled on the Blu-ray spine as "Curese of the Mummy’s Tomb".

== Critical reception ==
From contemporary reviews, Daily Cinema referred to the film as being "eerie but routine shocker thrills. But, hand it to Hammer, they've got this kind of scary hokum down to a grisly art".

Variety commented on the plot of the film stating that "one needs a crystal ball to sort out the reasons for some of the contrived goings on in the modest and rather slapdash horror pic".

The Monthly Film Bulletin noted that "the sewer finale has a moderate grandeur" but stated that "it is some indication of the film's lack of inventiveness that the mummy's first appearance should be so lengthily delayed".

In a retrospective review, AllMovie critic Cavett Binyon called the film a "rather dull mummy muddle".
