= Mr. Methane =

English entertainer

- Born: Paul Oldfield

Comedy career
- Years active: 1991–2006, 2007–present
- Genre: Speciality act

Paul Oldfield, better known by his stage name Mr. Methane, is a British flatulist who started performing in 1991. He briefly retired in 2006, but restarted in mid-2007. He claims to be the only performing farter in the world. He worked on the railways as a train driver. He took an early retirement after a train's brakes failed at Sheffield. After this incident, he focused on his flatulence performances.

== Background ==
According to When Will I Be Famous? (2003), a BBC book on British variety acts, Oldfield discovered his ability to fart on a whim at the age of 15 when practising yoga. The next day, eager to share his newfound ability, he performed twenty rapid-fire farts in under a minute for a group of his friends.

Oldfield is able to fart the notes of music in time and in tune. He worked for a few years as a train driver, and his boss told him that he would probably "make more money breaking wind than driving trains", inspiring him to pursue comedy professionally. He began touring, selling merchandise, and performing on television. He appeared on The Footy Show in Australia, resulting in numerous complaints to Channel 9.

In his autobiography, comic Frank Skinner talks about the time that Phil Spector, while receiving a lifetime music award, went into a rant live on Australian TV about a duet of "Da Doo Ron Ron" that Skinner had sung with Mr. Methane on his BBC1 chat show. Spector said that Methane and Skinner had taken his work of art and desecrated it.

In the 1990s, Mr. Methane produced a parody of the Phil Collins song "In the Air Tonight" titled "Curry In the Air Tonight." Tony Smith, Collins' business manager, refused to let Mr. Methane release his parody version, stating that, "This is a very serious song and we cannot see any reason for it to be taken so lightly." Letters between the two parties were reproduced on The Smoking Gun website.

A controversial segment in Swedish television history took place on 26 October 1991, when Mr. Methane appeared on the Swedish TV3 program I kväll: Robert Aschberg, hosted by Robert Aschberg. Mr. Methane performed, among other things, "God Save the Queen" and The Crystals' "Da Doo Ron Ron" in front of other guests seated on the couch beside him — including Sweden's then Minister for Foreign Affairs, Margaretha af Ugglas, and the human-rights activist Ingrid Segerstedt Wiberg. The TV channel TV3 was founded and run by businessman Jan Stenbeck, who was the brother of Foreign Minister Margaretha af Ugglas and with whom he had a well-known long-running family feud. According to Robert Aschberg, Stenbeck called him the following day and expressed concern that his sister might believe that Stenbeck himself had been behind the Mr. Methane appearance involving af Ugglas. The segment itself caused an uproar, marked by shock and disgust, sensational black headlines, and grandiose public condemnations.

In 2009, Oldfield auditioned for Britain's Got Talent, where he announced his intention to "put the art into fart".

== See also ==
- Flatulence humor – Form of toilet humor
- Le Pétomane – French entertainer
- Roland the Farter – Medieval English flatulist
- Toilet humour – Humour dealing with defecation, urination and flatulence
