= Jeanne Roland =

English actress

- Born: Myrna Jean Rollins; 19 March 1937 (age 88); Rangoon, British Burma
- Occupation(s): Actress, model
- Years active: 1954–1969
- Spouses: Albert Louis Baden (m. 1960; div. 1966); Jay Barry Kulick (m. 1967)
- Children: 2

Jeanne Roland (born 19 March 1937) is a Burmese-born English model and actress who has appeared in British television and film.

In 1949 she arrived in London from Rangoon with her family. She studied at Kingston Technical College.

== Personal life ==
From 1960 to 1966 she was married to the actor Albert Louis Baden. In 1967 she married the film producer Jay Barry Kulick.

== Selected filmography ==
Year	Title	Role	Notes
1954	The Beachcomber	Amao	as Jean Rollins
1959	The Captain's Table	Jennifer	Uncredited
1964	The Curse of the Mummy's Tomb	Annette Dubois	
1967	Casino Royale	Captain of the Guards	
1967	You Only Live Twice	Bond's Masseuse	
1968	Sebastian	Randy	
1968	Salt and Pepper	Mai Ling	
