= Roland the Farter =

Medieval English flatulist

- Other names: Roland le Fartere; Roulandus le Fartere; Rollandus le Pettus; Roland le Petour
- Employer: Henry II of England
- Children: Hubert de Afleton, son

Comedy career
- Medium: Jester

Roland the Farter (known in contemporary records as Roland le Fartere, Roulandus le Fartere, Rollandus le Pettus, or Roland le Petour) was a possibly fictional 12th-century English flatulist. He is listed in the 13th-century English Liber Feodorum (Book of Fees), which states he was given Hemingstone manor in Suffolk and 30 acres (12 hectares) of land in return for his services as a jester for King Henry II. Each year, he was obliged to perform "saltum, siffletum, pettum" (a jump, a whistle, and a fart all done at once) for the king's court at Christmas.

== Biography ==
There are no records of Roland's ancestors or spouse. After Roland's death, the Hemingstone Manor was passed to his son, Hubert de Afleton. Hubert had two children, Jeffery and Agnes. During the reign of King Richard I (1189–1199), Jeffery inherited the manor from his father. In 1205, the manor was held by Alexander de Brompton and his wife, Agnes, the sister-heir of Jeffrey, granddaughter of Roland. Though it is attested Roland performed in the courts of King Henry II, his association with King Henry II was established in 1159. It is thus unclear whether Roland only performed for King Henry II or for other prior monarchs. Some sources speculate that Henry was so delighted with Roland's performance, he rewarded him with a house and 99 acres (40 hectares) in Suffolk.

== Serjeanty ==
Roland held his manor and lands under tenure by serjeanty. According to the Liber Feodurum, or Book of Fees, Roland, under his serjeanty, was obligated to perform "a jump, a whistle, [and] a fart" every year on Christmas.

Seriantia que quondam fuit Rollandi le Pettour in Hemingeston in comitatu Suff ’, pro qua debuit facere die natali Domini singulis annis coram domino rege unum saltum et siffletum et unum bumbulum, que alienata fuit per particulas subscriptas.

— Henry Maxwell-Lyte, Liber feodorum, H.M. Stationery Office, 1920–1931, from the Deputy Keeper of the Records
Translation:

The serjeanty, which formerly was held by Roland the Farter in Hemingston in the county of Suffolk, for which he was obliged to perform every year on the birthday of our Lord before his master the king, "a jump, a whistle, [and] a fart," was alienated ['let to him'] in accordance with these specific requirements.

Roland had also received 110 acres (45 hectares) in Suffolk. In perspective, a knight's fee was 5 hides or carucates (varied widely). Each hide was between 100 and 110 acres (40 and 45 hectares), putting Roland's fee at one hide. Furthermore, a farmer with a house typically held 30 acres (12 hectares), while those on cottages had about 5 acres (2 hectares). It was thus argued that Roland's fee was indeed a "handsome" and "generous one".

== See also ==
- Flatulence humor – Form of toilet humor
- Le Pétomane – French entertainer
- Mr. Methane – English entertainer
- Toilet humour – Humour dealing with defecation, urination and flatulence
