= Toilet humour =

Humour dealing with defecation, urination and flatulence

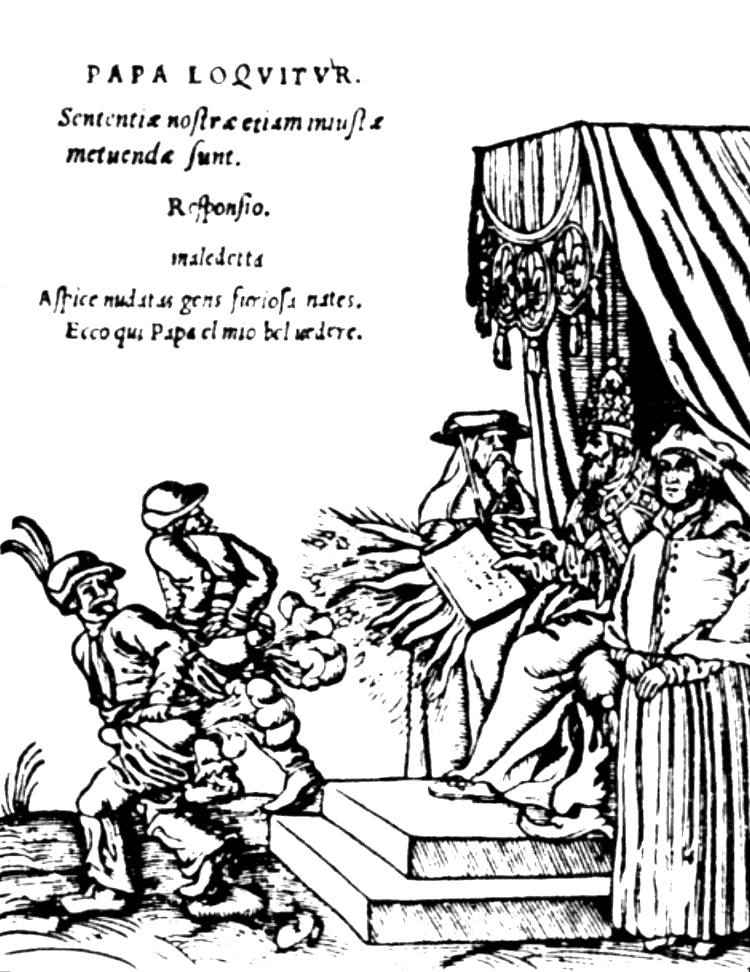
From a series of woodcuts (1545) usually referred to as the Papstspotbilder or Papstspottbilder in German or Depictions of the Papacy in English, by Lucas Cranach, commissioned by Martin Luther. Title: Kissing the Pope's Feet. (Note: In Latin, the title reads "Hic oscula pedibus papae figuntur".) German peasants respond to a papal bull of Pope Paul III. Caption reads: "Don't frighten us, Pope, with your ban, and don't be such a furious man. Otherwise we shall turn around and show you our rears." (Note: "Nicht Bapst: nicht schreck uns mit deim ban, Und sey nicht so zorniger man. Wir thun sonst ein gegen wehre, Und zeigen dirs Bel vedere")

Toilet humour (or scatological humor) is a type of off-colour humour dealing with: defecation, diarrhoea, constipation, urination, flatulence (see flatulence humor); or, to a lesser extent, vomiting and other bodily functions.

Toilet humour is commonly an interest of both children and adults, for whom cultural taboos related to acknowledgement of waste excretion still have a degree of novelty. The humour comes from the rejection of such taboos, and is a part of modern culture.

== Music ==
Toilet humour is sometimes found in song and rhyme, particularly schoolboy songs. Examples of this are found in Mozart and scatology, and variants of the German folk schoolboys' song known as the Scheiße-Lied (English: "Shit-Song") which is indexed in the German Volksliederarchiv. A children's Spanish musical duo, Enrique y Ana, made a song called "Caca Culo Pedo Pis", which literally translates to "Poop Butt Fart Pee".

Detroit rapper Eminem famously utilises crude humour throughout his discography. His most notorious example of toilet humour was featured on the 2017 album Revival, where he raps "Your booty is heavy duty, like diarrhoea", a line which received extensive lament from critics. The Los Angeles Times comments: "If Hannibal Lecter could have recorded a rap album, this would have been it. Brilliant, sinister, scatological and a parent's nightmare."

Czech goregrind band Gutalax, along with some grindcore bands uses cloaca humour as its primary musical themes.

== Performance ==
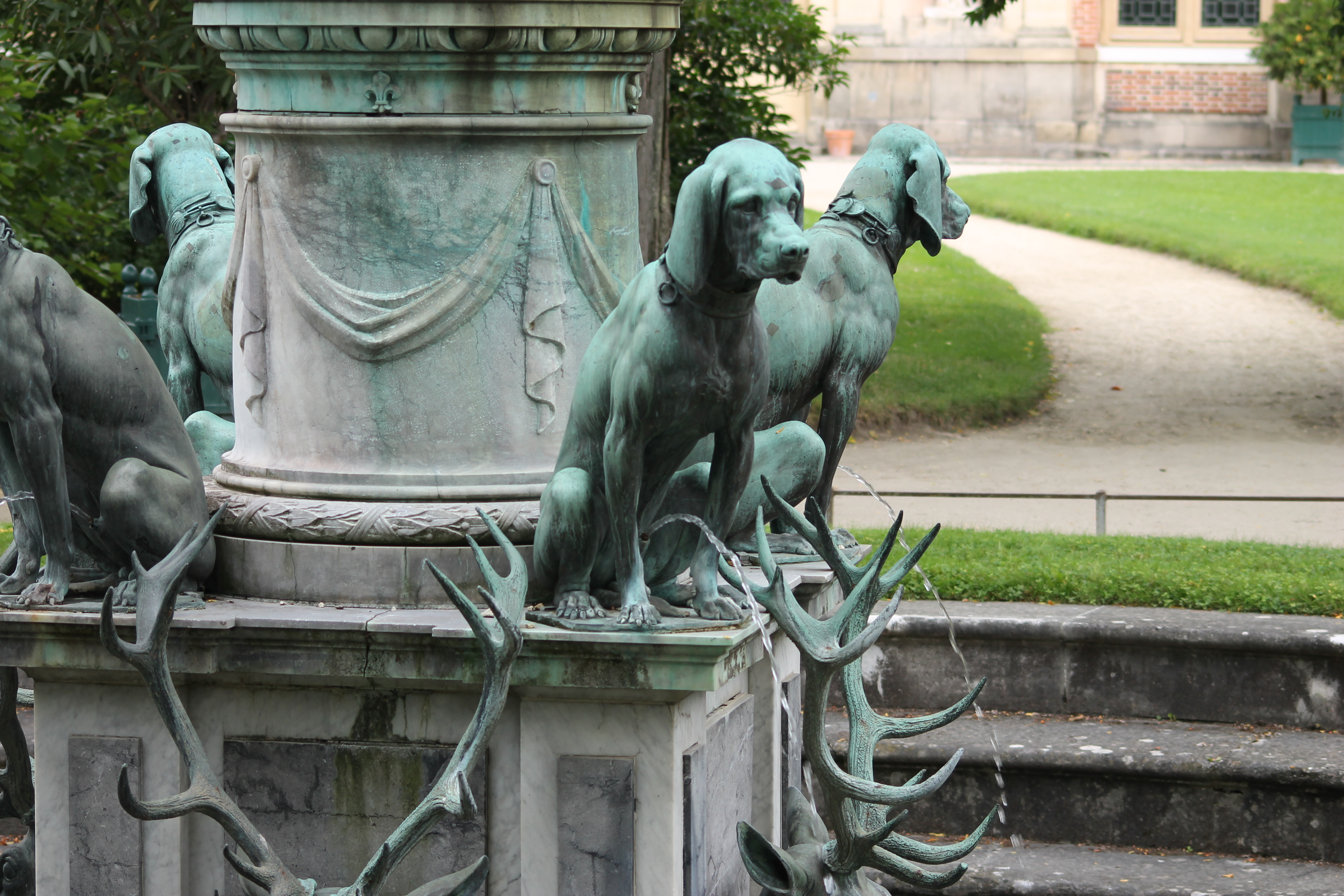
Urinating dog statues at the Fountain of Diana

Paul Oldfield, who performed under the name Mr. Methane, performed a stage act that included him farting the notes of music. Joseph Pujol, who performed under the name Le Pétomane (French for "fart maniac"), performed a similar stage act for the Paris music hall scene.

The American comedy duo Tim & Eric have made numerous comedy sketches based around toilet humour. For example, they have made fake commercials for non-existent products such as the "Poop Tube" (a device that lets people release liquefied faecal matter into a urinal while standing up), the "fla'Hat" (a hat that is connected to the wearer's anus which expands when storing flatulence), and "D-Pants" (an undergarment invented by "Diah Riha-Jones" that captures "uncontrollable diarrhoea").

In the series South Park, the Canadian comedy duo Terrance and Phillip are noted for toilet humour and often make comedic use of their flatulence e.g. in the song "Uncle Fucker".

English actor Adrian Edmondson, who appeared in many shows utilising toilet humour, is quoted as saying, "Toilet humour is like jazz: everybody has an idea what it is, and most people don't like it. But the people who do like it are fervent about it and like it until they die."

== Books ==
In 1929 comedian Charles "Chic" Sale published a small book, The Specialist, which was a large "underground" success. Its entire premise centred on sales of outhouses, touting the advantages of one kind or another, and labelling them in "technical" terms such as "one-holers", "two-holers", etc. Over a million copies were sold. In 1931 his monologue "I'm a Specialist" was made into a hit record (Victor 22859) by recording artist Frank Crumit (music by Nels Bitterman). As memorialised in the "Outhouse Wall of Fame", the term "Chic Sale" became a rural slang synonym for privies, an appropriation of Mr. Sale's name that he personally considered unfortunate.

More recently, one of the most popular books about defecation, diarrhoea and accidents in toilets is by straight-talking physician Jane Wilson-Howarth, a guide that began as Shitting Pretty and then was relaunched as How to Shit around the World.

The famous Russian literary satirist Vladimir Voinovich included toilet humour to criticise food policies in the Soviet Union. His novel Moscow 2042 (1987) presents a negative utopia in which a fictional communist government recycles faeces to create food for common citizens while the powerful eat proper food. In Voinovich's previous novel Life and Adventures of Private Ivan Chonkin (1969/ 1975), a farmer experiments with urine and faeces and brews vodka out of excrement.

The children's book series Captain Underpants makes copious use of toilet humour. "Doctor Diaper", "The Bionic Booger Boy", and "Professor Pippy Pee-Pee Poopypants" are among the villains in the series.

== Video games ==
A game notorious for its juvenile humour, Conker's Bad Fur Day contains a plentiful amount of scatological jokes. One of the landmark areas is a "Poo Mountain" and some of its missions involve getting cows to drink a laxative prune juice to produce "pooballs", or fighting The Great Mighty Poo, a giant opera-singing pile of faeces as a boss. In a later mission, the game's protagonist also has urination as an attack, after drinking a lot of beer and getting drunk.

Toilet humour is also versatile in the Metal Gear franchise. Solid Snake can protect himself from wolf attacks by having one urinate on him. In Metal Gear Solid 2: Sons of Liberty, Raiden can spot soldiers relieving themselves several times and also stand under them. In Metal Gear Rising: Revengeance, Raiden is instructed in order to use a terminal, he first needs to "take a DOOMP", which is an abbreviation for "digital-optical output mounted proxy".

Kojima's later game Death Stranding included a mechanic allowing the player character to urinate in the field, as well as urinate or defecate in his room's bathroom, where his bodily output can be processed into grenades of types "number 1" and "number 2".

A trait of Wario from the eponymous Mario spin-off franchise is a powerful flatulence attack extensively used in his Super Smash Bros. appearance.

== Toys ==
The Moose Toys franchise Little Live "Gotta Go" Pets is a toy line of interactive plush animals that "poop" when fed colourful sand. The toys make graphic noises of passing gas, panic and say the words "uh-oh! Gotta go!" and have scatological names including "turdle" (turtle). The internet critic Doug Walker called the toys "disgusting" and found them immature and inappropriate. Parenting blogs praised the toy line for its crude humour approach to potty training.

Mattel fashion doll Barbie has a plastic Golden Retriever, named Tanner, which has been an available toy in different variations since the 1990s. Tanner the dog eats brown bean-like beads and then poops them out when its tail is pressed. Barbie can then pick up the plastic poop with a scooper that comes with the playsets.

Infant dolls, typically targeted towards little girls, have existed for decades that urinate and defecate (into diapers or potties) as a play feature. Variants include "Magic Potty Baby" (a 1990s Tyco brand doll) and "Baby Alive" (and Amazon knock-off counterfeit variants) that pee, poop and release glitter from their rear ends. The trend of scatological dolls for girls was mocked on the 1970s British comedy TV series Are You Being Served? in the episode "A Change Is as Good as a Rest"; salesman Mr. Lucas fills Ms. Brahms's peeing dollies with fizzy carbonated lemonade; another gag features character Mrs. Slocombe displaying two doll variants to a customer: the one manufactured in Britain is blonde-haired and says "I want to go to the potty" when a string on its back is pulled, while a similar doll with sandy hair manufactured in India says "my name is Yasmin, and I have just been to the potty" when its string is pulled.

== See also ==
- Bum trilogy
- Dick joke
- Fartman
- Flatulence humour
- Gross out
- Grotesque body
- Interactive urinal
- Le Pétomane
- Lighting farts
- Mr. Methane
- Outhouse § Races and pranks
- Roland the Farter
- Scatology
- Skibidi Toilet
- Sophomoric humour
- Whoopee cushion
