= Flatulist =

Entertainer

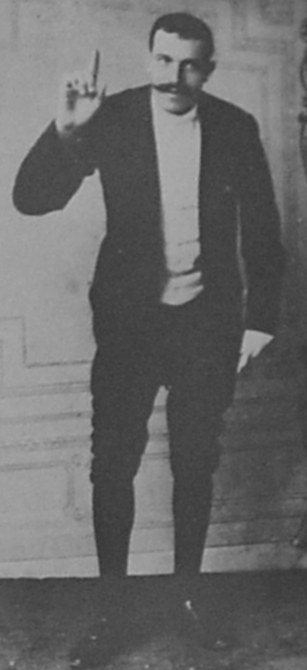
Le Pétomane was a professional flatulist around the start of the 20th century in France.

A flatulist, fartist, professional farter or simply farter is an entertainer often associated with flatulence-related humor, whose routine consists solely or primarily of passing gas in a creative, musical, or amusing manner.

== History ==
There are a number of scattered references to ancient and medieval flatulists, who could produce various rhythms and pitches with their intestinal wind. Saint Augustine in The City of God (De Civitate Dei) (14.24) mentions some performers who did have "such command of their bowels, that they can break wind continuously at will, so as to produce the effect of singing." Juan Luis Vives, in his 1522 commentary to Augustine's work, testifies to having himself witnessed such a feat, a remark referenced by Michel de Montaigne in an essay.

The professional farters of medieval Ireland were called braigetoír. They are listed together with other performers and musicians in the 12th century Tech Midchúarda, a diagram of the banqueting hall of Tara. As entertainers, these braigetoír ranked at the lower end of a scale headed by bards, fili, and harpers.

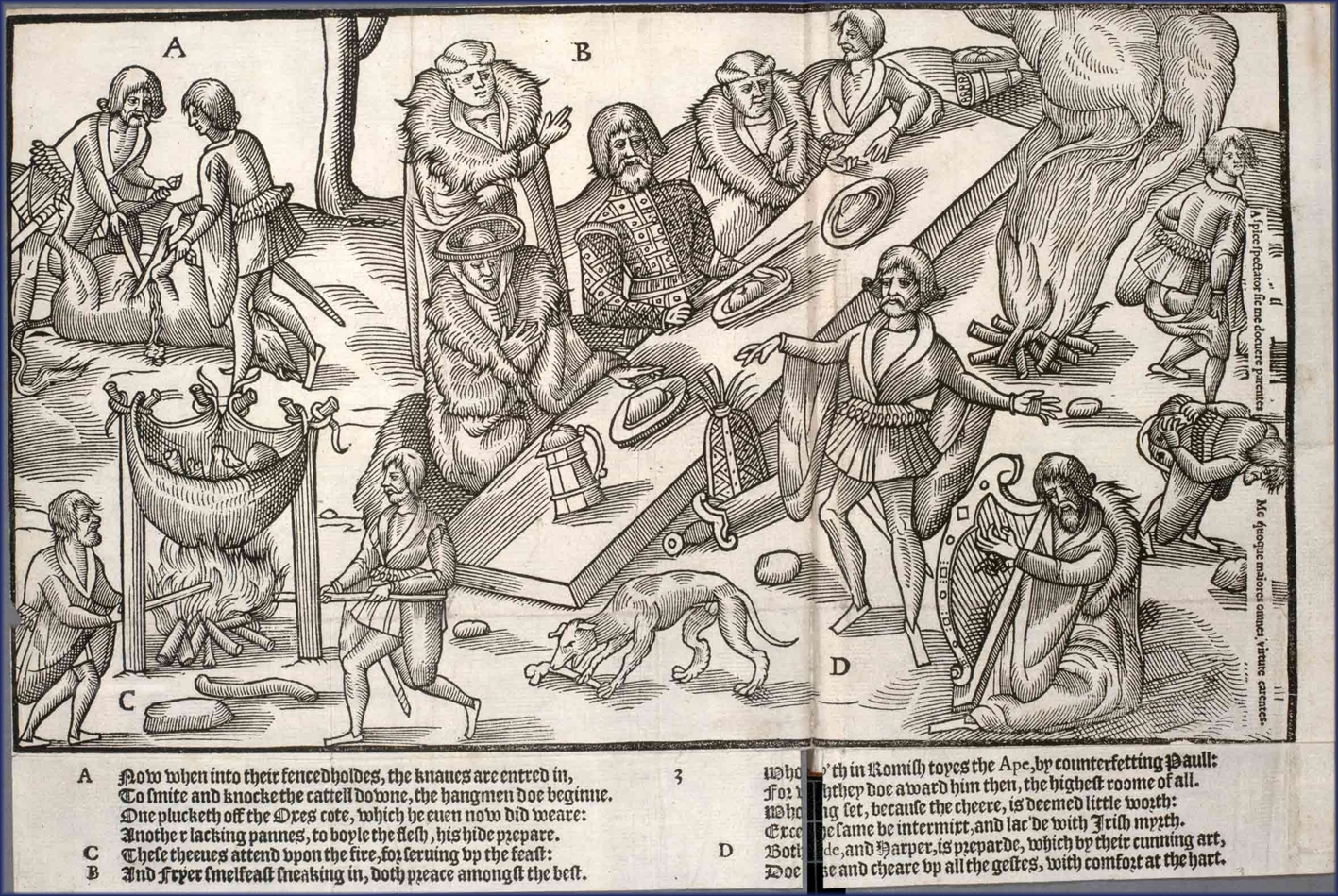
1581, England. Image from the book The Image of Irelande, with a Discoverie of Woodkarne by John Derricke. At the far right are minstrels lowering their pants, to fart for the lord's entertainment.

An entry in the 13th-century English Liber Feodorum or Book of Fees lists one Roland the Farter, who held Hemingstone manor in the county of Suffolk, for which he was obliged to perform "Unum saltum et siffletum et unum bombulum" (one jump and whistle and one fart) annually at the court of King Henry II every Christmas. The Activa Vita character in the 14th century allegorical poem Piers Plowman appears to number farting among the abilities desirable in a good entertainer, Trotter quoted a Latin extract from the Liber Feodorum or Book of Fees in which the word was used; "Roland le Pettour had to perform the service of bumbulum (Note: According to a draft made by David Trotter for the Dictionary of Medieval Latin from British Sources, bumbulum, otherwise the name of a very different musical instrument, may be named due to sound of the word resembling that of flatulence.) to the king on Christmas Day in order to have the right to hold his land." saying: "As for me, I can neither drum nor trumpet, nor tell jokes, nor fart amusingly at parties, nor play the harp."

Seriantia que quondam fuit Rollandi le Pettour in Hemingeston in comitatu Suff', pro qua debuit facere die Natali Domini singulis annis coram domino rege unum saltum et sifflettum et unum bumbulum, que alienata fuit per particulas subscriptas.

Translation:

The following (lands), which formerly were held of Roland the Farter in Hemingston in the county of Suffolk, for which he was obliged to perform every year on the birthday of our Lord before his master the king, one jump, one whistle, and one fart, were alienated in accordance with these specific requirements.

In Japan, during the Edo period, flatulists were known as "heppiri otoko" (放屁男), lit. "farting men." The term He-gassen (屁合戦), "farting competitions", is applied to Edo-period art scrolls depicting flatulence.

== Notable flatulists ==
- Roland the Farter, flatulist in the court of King Henry II of England
- Le Pétomane, performed in France from 1887 until 1914
- Mr. Methane, born 1966

== See also ==
- Manualism (hand music)
