= List of Porridge episodes =

The following is a list of episodes for the British television sitcom Porridge, which aired on BBC1 from 5 September 1974 to 25 March 1977. A further sequel series following the grandson of Fletcher, Porridge, aired in 2016 and 2017.

== Series overview ==
Series	Episodes	Originally released	
Series	Episodes	First released	Last released
Pilot		1 April 1973	
1	6	5 September 1974	10 October 1974
2	6	24 October 1975	28 November 1975
Christmas '75		24 December 1975	
Christmas ‘76		24 December 1976	
3	6	18 February 1977	25 March 1977
Film		12 August 1979	
Mockumentary		26 December 2003	
Porridge (2016)	7	28 August 2016	10 November 2017

== Porridge ==
=== Pilot (1973) ===
No.	Title	Directed by	Written by	Original release date	UK viewers (millions)
Pilot (1973)
-	"Prisoner and Escort"	James Gilbert	Dick Clement and Ian La Frenais	1 April 1973	TBA
Norman Stanley Fletcher, a career criminal, is sentenced to five years in prison for his latest crime, which sees him being transported on New Year's Eve from London up to Slade Prison in Cumberland. For the journey, he finds himself placed under the watch of the kind-hearted Mr Barrowclough and the authoritarian Mr Mackay, both of whom work at Slade Prison. But along the way, Fletcher is given an opportunity to make life in prison a little easy when a minor mishap occurs on the journey.

=== Series 1 (1974) ===
No.	Title	Directed by	Written by	Original release date	UK viewers (millions)
Series One (1974)
1	"New Faces, Old Hands"	Sydney Lotterby	Dick Clement and Ian La Frenais	5 September 1974	TBA
Fletcher arrives at Slade Prison, where he is checked in amongst the new arrivals. Mackay, knowing of Fletcher's past history, instructs him with telling the new arrivals of what life in prison is like, including giving the lesson to the young and naive Lennie Godber, a first time offender. Fletcher naturally takes a liking to Godber, despite Mackay fearing he will corrupt him, as the arrivals are checked over before being assigned to their cells.
2	"The Hustler"	Sydney Lotterby	Dick Clement and Ian La Frenais	12 September 1974	TBA
Fletcher is eager to run an illicit gambling enterprise within Slade, roping in help from fellow inmates Lukewarm, Evans and Hislop. Mackay is naturally eager to prevent such activities happening because of the trouble it could cause, even when Barrowclough points out it will still happen under his watch. When Fletcher arranges for a high stakes game of snakes and ladders in the prison's boiler room, Mackay ensures the event is properly disrupted.
3	"A Night In"	Sydney Lotterby	Dick Clement and Ian La Frenais	19 September 1974	TBA
Fletcher is not happy that the cell he thought he had on his own must now be shared with Godber, his new cellmate, and is intent on laying out the strict rules he has for their living arrangements. Once inside, Godber struggles to get any sleep, leading to him and Fletcher spending the night discussing many things about the aspects of their lives and life in prison.
4	"A Day Out"	Sydney Lotterby	Dick Clement and Ian La Frenais	26 September 1974	TBA
Fletcher and Godber are assigned to a work party that will be digging ditches out in the country, overseen by Mackay and Barrowclough. When Mackay needs to make a trip into a nearby village, Fletcher takes advantage of Barrowclough to slip away to the local pub on the pretext of getting first aid. When he is forced to hurry back to the others, who are resting up in a church, a serious problem soon puts Barrowclough and the prisoners into a tricky predicament.
5	"Ways and Means"	Sydney Lotterby	Dick Clement and Ian La Frenais	3 October 1974	TBA
Fletcher is not happy when a new prisoner, McLaren, proves to be highly troublesome because of an attitude problem, especially following an incident with a prison officer and soup. The matter isn't helped by McLaren being a Scottish black of illegitimate birth, but Fletcher is determined to make him change his way by helping him out with a risky scheme, one he soon has some regrets about.
6	"Men Without Women"	Sydney Lotterby	Dick Clement and Ian La Frenais	10 October 1974	TBA
Fletcher decides to act as Slade Prison's own agony aunt, writing letters for the inmates to their lovers and wives, and helping Warren with his letters due to his inability to read. However, a personal crisis soon arrives for Fletcher, when his daughter Ingrid informs him that his own marriage is in trouble. While the inmates gloat about his problems, Fletcher is given compassionate leave to sort out the mess, but all is not what it seems.

=== Series 2 (1975) ===
No.	Title	Directed by	Written by	Original release date	UK viewers (millions)
Series Two (1975)
8	"Just Desserts"	Sydney Lotterby	Dick Clement and Ian La Frenais	24 October 1975	TBA
Fletch is appalled when someone steals his tin of pineapple chunks and is determined to catch the culprit. This comes as no surprise, as there are 600 men in Slade Prison, and two-thirds are in for theft. Fletcher means there is a thief on the inside, as his tin of pineapple chunks has been stolen. Other prisoners comment that they have had things stolen, such as a jar of gooseberry preserve. This suggests that the thief has a sweet tooth.
9	"Heartbreak Hotel"	Sydney Lotterby	Dick Clement and Ian La Frenais	31 October 1975	TBA
After his girlfriend, Denise, breaks up with him via a Dear John letter, Godber assaults a fellow inmate. At the same time, Fletch starts questioning his daughter, Ingrid, over her personal life. Godber asks Fletcher why the BBC never plays prisoners' requests on the radio. Fletcher explains it is because the system is open to abuse, where songs may be a message for someone to help with an escape.
10	"Disturbing the Peace"	Sydney Lotterby	Dick Clement and Ian La Frenais	7 November 1975	TBA
The prisoners are overjoyed when Mackay leaves on a promotion course, until they meet his replacement, Mr Wainwright, whom Fletcher remembers from a previous stretch in Brixton. Wainwright is a harsh prison officer who soon recognises Fletcher and starts bullying the prisoners. His antics included punishing Godber for accidentally dropping mashed potatoes on his shoe and purposely treading on Fletcher's hand.
11	"No Peace for the Wicked"	Sydney Lotterby	Dick Clement and Ian La Frenais	14 November 1975	TBA
With everyone watching a football match, Fletch attempts to snatch a few precious minutes of peace and quiet, only to suffer constant interruptions, among whom are Mackay and visiting members of the Home Office, who then insist on questioning Fletch about his views on the penal system.
12	"Happy Release"	Sydney Lotterby	Dick Clement and Ian La Frenais	21 November 1975	TBA
Mackay is appalled to discover that Fletch has been severely injured (a broken ankle) and is in the hospital wing. He and Blanco devise a plan for revenge on Norris, who had stolen his possessions some time before Fletch arrived.
13	"The Harder They Fall"	Sydney Lotterby	Dick Clement and Ian La Frenais	28 November 1975	TBA
Fletch, under "Genial" Harry Grout's orders, tries to rig a boxing match so that Godber, who is favourite to win, loses, only to discover Godber is taking orders from one of Grouty's rivals.
Christmas Special (1975)
14	"No Way Out"	Sydney Lotterby	Dick Clement and Ian La Frenais	24 December 1975	TBA
A planned escape causes all kinds of trouble just before Christmas, and Fletch attempts to spend some valuable time in the infirmary.
Christmas Special (1976)
15	"The Desperate Hours"	Sydney Lotterby	Dick Clement and Ian La Frenais	24 December 1976	TBA
Fletcher, Godber, Barrowclough and the governor's secretary are held hostage by a desperate prisoner Reg Urwin with a homemade gun attempting to escape.

=== Series 3 (1977) ===
No.	Title	Directed by	Written by	Original release date	UK viewers (millions)
Series Three (1977)
16	"A Storm in a Teacup"	Sydney Lotterby	Dick Clement and Ian La Frenais	18 February 1977	TBA
After a capsule containing pills that Harris stole goes missing, Grouty attempts to locate them and Fletch is recruited to help, not realising that they are in his mug of tea.
17	"Poetic Justice"	Sydney Lotterby	Dick Clement and Ian La Frenais	25 February 1977	TBA
Fletch is incensed to discover that he is getting a new cellmate. To make matters worse, it turns out that the cellmate is the judge that sentenced him.
18	"Rough Justice"	Sydney Lotterby	Dick Clement and Ian La Frenais	4 March 1977	TBA
After Judge Rawley's watch is stolen, everyone is convinced that Harris is the culprit, and so a kangaroo court is set up in an effort to convict him of the crime.
19	"Pardon Me"	Sydney Lotterby	Dick Clement and Ian La Frenais	11 March 1977	TBA
Blanco refuses parole after serving a life sentence for a murder he always claims he never committed, so Fletch sets up an appeal committee to get him pardoned.
20	"A Test of Character"	Sydney Lotterby	Dick Clement and Ian La Frenais	18 March 1977	TBA
Fletch is determined to help Godber pass his History O-level, so he has Warren steal the papers, only to discover that Godber does not want them. Meanwhile, a debate flares up over a claim of Warren's that, at a certain scale, the nearest star from the Sun would be in Johannesburg.
21	"Final Stretch"	Sydney Lotterby	Dick Clement and Ian La Frenais	25 March 1977	TBA
With his parole hearing less than a week away, Godber has a fight with football hooligan Jarvis, and Fletch realises that he will have to risk solitary confinement and loss of his own remission to help Godber. Meanwhile, Fletch is suspicious of his daughter's holiday plans.

== Porridge feature film (1979) ==
No.	Title	Director	Writers	First broadcast	Ratings (millions)
1	"Porridge"	Dick Clement	Dick Clement and Ian La Frenais	12 August 1979	N/A
Set a year before the final episode of the TV series.

== Life Beyond the Box: Norman Stanley Fletcher (2003) ==
No.	Title	Director	Writers	First broadcast	Ratings (millions)
1	"Life Beyond the Box: Norman Stanley Fletcher"	Kim Flitcroft	Danny Robins, Dan Tetsell	26 December 2003	2.2
The life of Norman Stanley Fletcher is detailed, with interviews with his family, friends and old cellmates

== Porridge (2016) ==
=== Series 1 (2016-17) ===
No.	Title	Director	Writers	First broadcast	Ratings (millions)
Pilot (2016)
1	"Porridge"	Dominic Brigstocke	Dick Clement, Ian La Frenais	28 August 2016	5.68
After being caught and put on trial for hacking credit cards and committing other cyber crimes for personal gain, Nigel Norman Fletcher is sentenced to five years at Wakeley Prison. A few weeks after arriving, Fletcher finds himself sharing his cell with a new prisoner, Joe Lotterby, a senior criminal who knew his grandfather in the past. Meanwhile, Richie Weeks, a hardened criminal who runs an enterprise in the prison, requests that Fletcher use his IT skills to sanitise his record, to ensure his upcoming parole hearing goes without a hitch, though things do not go as smoothly as Fletcher hopes for.
Series One (2017)
2	"The Go-Between"	Dominic Brigstocke	Dick Clement, Ian La Frenais	6 October 2017	3.98
Fletcher has taken to helping his fellow inmates with appeals, letters home and the like, to earn a few things on the side. But things soon become complicated when he agrees to help a new prisoner maintain contact with his girlfriend, only for his own words and charm to earn their attention instead of their boyfriend's.
3	"The Cake"	Dominic Brigstocke	Dick Clement, Ian La Frenais	13 October 2017	N/A
Concerned that Braithwaite is not suitable for guard duty, Meekie requests a replacement, who turns out to be his female equivalent in terms of her tough stance with the prisoners. Meanwhile, Parfitt instructs one of Fletcher's friends to accept a visit from one of his girls and take a gift from them, but a mix-up soon puts Fletcher into hot water with him.
4	"The Minder"	Dominic Brigstocke	Dick Clement, Ian La Frenais	20 October 2017	N/A
As a way of Richie Weeks thanking him for helping him get paroled, Fletcher finds himself receiving Parfitt's right-hand man Scudds as his personal minder. But he soon finds it being quite problematic having him around, especially when he has to get rid of a dead pigeon that has been used by another prisoner to smuggle in drugs.
5	"The Witness"	Dominic Brigstocke	Dick Clement, Ian La Frenais	27 October 2017	N/A
With Wakeley Prison set to receive a visit from a group of VIPs, seeking to see how well the prisoners are being treated, Fletcher finds himself being recruited to be an adviser for Parfitt's gang. He soon finds himself not liking the position, when his efforts to ensure Parfitt is rid of any illegal business he has in the prison winds up causing a fight during the VIP's visit, where he soon finds himself stuck in a cupboard with one of them, who happens to be the mother of the girl he was committing cyber crimes for.
6	"The Listener"	Dominic Brigstocke	Dick Clement, Ian La Frenais	3 November 2017	N/A
Learning that Rob Strange, a former rock star with possible suicidal tendencies due to depression, is set to arrive at Wakeley Prison to serve time for illegally making drugs, Fletcher finds himself tasked by Littlewood to keep an eye on him, in exchange for receiving something in return if he accepts. But it's not an easy task for him, especially when he has to rely on his ex-girlfriend to track down someone Strange sent away at his last gig.
7	"The Rift"	Dominic Brigstocke	Dick Clement, Ian La Frenais	10 November 2017	N/A
Having acquired himself the right to run a radio station within Wakeley Prison, Fletcher soon finds it causing friction between himself and Lotterby due to his need to be up early to run his morning radio show. But he soon regrets his attitude towards his cellmate, when he finds him unconscious outside in the freezing cold weather.
