= List of Porridge characters =

Television series

Porridge is a British sitcom, starring Ronnie Barker and Richard Beckinsale, written by Dick Clement and Ian La Frenais, and broadcast on BBC1 from 1974 to 1977. The programme ran for three series and two Christmas specials, and was followed by a feature film of the same name (in the United States, the film was released under the title Doing Time).

The sitcom focuses on two prison inmates, Norman Stanley Fletcher (played by Barker) and Lennie Godber (played by Beckinsale), who are serving time at the fictional HMP Slade in Cumberland.

Several characters from Porridge reappear in the sequel series Going Straight (1978) and in the 2003 spoof documentary Life Beyond the Box: Norman Stanley Fletcher. The 2016 'reboot' series of Porridge has a different cast of characters, including Nigel Norman Fletcher, grandson of Norman Stanley Fletcher in the original series.

== Overview ==
Character	Porridge (1973–1977)																						Going Straight						LBTB	Porridge (2016–2017)						
Character	P	Series 1						Series 2						Specials		Film	Series 3						Going Straight						LBTB	Porridge (2016–2017)						
Character	P	1	2	3	4	5	6	1	2	3	4	5	6	S1	S2	Film	1	2	3	4	5	6	1	2	3	4	5	6	LBTB	P	1	2	3	4	5	6
Slade Prison inmates
Norman Stanley Fletcher																																				
Lennie Godber																																				
'Bunny' Warren																																				
Jim McLaren																																				
'Lukewarm'																																				
'Blanco' Webb																																				
Harry Grout																																				
Ives																																				
Harris																																				
Cyril Heslop																																				
Judge Rawley																																				
Mr Banyard																																				
Slade Prison staff
Mr Mackay																																				
Mr Barrowclough																																				
Mr Venables																																				
Mr Collinson																																				
Mr Appleton																																				
Fletcher family
Ingrid Fletcher																																				
Raymond Fletcher																																				
Wakeley Prison inmates
Nigel Fletcher																																				
Joe Lotterby																																				
Shel																																				
Aziz																																				
Dougie Parfitt																																				
Scuddsy																																				
Nagid																																				
Culhane																																				
Ullett																																				
Loomis																																				
Wakeley Prison staff
Mr Meekie																																				
Mr Braithwaite																																				
Mrs Hallwood																																				
Dr Marsden																																				
Miss Driscoll																																				
Others
Mr McEwan																																				
Mrs Chapman																																				
Sharon																																				
Character	P	1	2	3	4	5	6	1	2	3	4	5	6	S1	S2	Film	1	2	3	4	5	6	1	2	3	4	5	6	LBTB	P	1	2	3	4	5	6
Character	P	Series 1						Series 2						Specials		Film	Series 3						Going Straight						LBTB	Porridge (2016–2017)						
Character	Porridge (1973–1977)																						Going Straight						LBTB	Porridge (2016–2017)						

== Mr Barrowclough ==
Henry Barrowclough is a prison officer portrayed by Brian Wilde. Unlike Mr Mackay, whose harsh and confrontational methods he disapproves of (though he dare not make this known to Mr Mackay), Barrowclough is a timid, sympathetic man who firmly believes that the role of prison is to rehabilitate rather than punish. He does not share Mackay's tough military background, having done his National Service in Royal Air Force stores in the comfortable surroundings of Singapore.

Mr Barrowclough does not seem to be cut out for the life of a prison officer, and he says in the movie version whilst in conversation with a new officer that Slade prison (the officer's club at least) is a "miserable place" and that the only reason he stays is that it keeps him away from being at home with his wife. Fletcher and the other prisoners constantly abuse his leniency to acquire more pleasant jobs, cells or special privileges. They also know how to forge his signature. However, despite this, the prisoners do hold a great deal of fondness for Barrowclough. At one point, in an attempt to raise his prestige due to the vicious nature of Mr. Wainwright, the temporary replacement for Mr Mackay, they stage a riot, refusing to stop for even the harshest of threats, including Wainwright himself. But when, on Fletch's suggestion, Barrowclough is called into the hall, they fall silent as he nervously enters, and do not hesitate in obeying his rather timid requests, such as, "Now, why don't you all put those things down...?" and, "In the meantime, why don't we all file back to our cells in a nice, orderly fashion...?"

However nervous his job makes Mr Barrowclough, it is nothing compared to the fear he has of his oft-mentioned but never seen wife, Alice. It is partly because of Fletcher's advice on dealing with his wife that Barrowclough is especially accommodating when dealing with his requests and misdemeanours. Fletcher once described him as looking like "Arthur Askey on stilts".

== Ingrid Fletcher ==
Ingrid Rita Godber (née Fletcher) was played by Patricia Brake. Ingrid is Fletch's eldest child (allegedly conceived against Karl Marx's tomb). She often visited her father in Slade Prison, oblivious to her appeal to the other inmates, much to her father's despair. It was on one of these trips that she met Fletch's cellmate Godber. Upon Godber's release the two met up, and by the time Fletch was released, three years later, the two were engaged. They were married in the final episode of Going Straight and are seen to be still married 25 years later in the spoof documentary, Life Beyond the Box: Norman Stanley Fletcher, with one son.

== Norman Stanley Fletcher ==
Norman Stanley Fletcher was played by Ronnie Barker. Known as "Fletch", he is the main character in the series and shares a cell with Lennie Godber. A habitual criminal from north London, Fletch has previously served several terms of imprisonment. After he is released, he ends his life of crime for an honest living.

== Lennie Godber ==
Lennie Godber as portrayed by Richard Beckinsale

Leonard Arthur "Lennie" Godber was played by Richard Beckinsale. Godber is from Birmingham, supports Aston Villa, has an O Level in geography, and studies for a history O Level while in prison. Before he was arrested he shared a flat with his girlfriend Denise in nearby Smethwick. In an effort to help her furnish her new apartment, Godber broke into a neighbour's flat. He was caught, and it was for this that he was sentenced to two years' imprisonment. Denise later broke up with Godber through a Dear John letter.

Godber often came into conflict with the ever suspicious Mr Mackay, who appeared to find it very hard to believe that Lennie was not up to something. Even when he was, MacKay found it very hard to pin anything on him, thanks to Godber's penchant for dramatics, and, occasionally, to the cover-up efforts of Fletch and the sympathetic Mr Barrowclough. Godber works in the prison kitchen where he has ample opportunities to steal valuable commodities, such as butter and pineapple chunks, which Fletcher is fond of. Godber also briefly took up a career as a boxer in the prison, although this was short-lived when he became involved in a match fixing feud between Harry Grout and Billy Moffat.

Despite his run-ins with Mr Mackay, there were occasions where Mr Mackay was shown to be supportive of Godber due to his willingness to take part in physical activity and education, unlike Fletcher.

Godber appears in all but four episodes of Porridge. He is absent from the pilot ("Prisoner and Escort"), series 1 episodes "Ways and Means" and "Men Without Women", and series 2's "No Peace for the Wicked". In the sequel Going Straight, Godber is engaged to Fletcher's daughter Ingrid, having met her whilst she was on a prison visit. In the final episode, they get married. In the 2003 mockumentary Life Beyond the Box: Norman Stanley Fletcher, they are still married, and have a son. Richard Beckinsale died in 1979, so Godber's absence from the mockumentary is explained by a phone call to his wife saying he was stuck in traffic.

== Harry Grout ==
Harry Grout as portrayed by Peter Vaughan

"Genial" Harry Grout, also referred to as 'Grouty', is a gangster feared by all the prisoners and by some of the guards. His schemes include running a drugs ring funded by the doctor's office and fixing boxing matches. If crossed, Grouty has little hesitation in setting one of his various heavies, such as Crusher (John Dair), on those who displease him. Grouty also arranges things such as prison breaks, as seen in the Christmas special "No Way Out," in which the major plot involves his trying to arrange a breakout plan, with much help from an unwilling Fletcher. Despite his reputation, Grouty will handsomely reward those who aid him, shown when he sends Fletcher a box of Cuban cigars for Christmas for his help in the breakout plan, but he is still shown to be wary of Mr. Mackay, and has a gangster rival named Billy Moffat.

In the 2003 mockumentary Life Beyond The Box: Norman Stanley Fletcher, it is revealed that after being released from prison Grouty continued running his "business empire" (although he insisted it was now straight, and no one could prove otherwise), and also became a "celebrity criminal", in a similar manner to Frankie Fraser and The Krays. He died of a heart attack, but just before he died, he told Fletcher where his stash was hidden. Fletcher is seen laying a memorial wreath at his funeral which simply says "Nerk".

== Cyril Heslop ==
Cyril Heslop was played by Brian Glover. Heslop is prominent in series 1 of the show and was briefly Fletcher's cellmate. He was also one of the three new arrivals, along with Fletcher and Godber, into Slade Prison in the first episode of the series, having been given three years for breaking and entering. Heslop is quite dim and slow-witted, once being described by Mr Mackay as "thick as two short planks."

This is also demonstrated by him always being several minutes behind every conversation, such as laughing at jokes made some time earlier or making remarks to or asking questions about a subject that was talked about many minutes ago, when the conversation has moved on. Heslop is also known among the prison inmates for his interesting anecdotes, many of which relate to events which took place "at the wife's sister's in Sidcup", which he launches into at random moments, with every inmate present ending their conversation to listen to him. It is mentioned in his first appearance his birthday was on 1 April, which Fletcher considers to be "quite fitting" for him.

== Lukewarm ==
Lukewarm was played by Christopher Biggins. Lukewarm is a rotund young man with a calm and personable demeanour, who originates from the Midlands (though during the series, and in Going Straight he is said to live in Middlesbrough). The circumstances that brought him to be in prison are unknown, although in one episode – the Porridge Christmas Special, "No Way Out" – he relieved Mr Barrowclough of his watch in a manner strongly suggestive of a pickpocket. He is openly gay, and his partner Trevor is a watch repairer from Southport; Trevor appears in the episode "Men Without Women". Lukewarm shared a cell with the elderly Blanco, over whom he would fuss a lot, especially when Blanco was due to face the parole board. Blanco did concede that, for all his fussing, Lukewarm did keep the cell nice and clean. Lukewarm is often seen knitting.

Although he is a trusted friend and confidant of Fletcher's, he seldom becomes directly involved in his schemes, preferring instead to spend his association time observing the latest goings-on whilst busying himself with his latest knitting projects. He works in the kitchens alongside Godber and is an enthusiastic if notoriously untalented cook, although it was said that he did make good pasties. Lukewarm was released three months prior to Fletcher in Going Straight. Fletcher mentions to McLaren that he received a letter from Lukewarm, stating his case is coming up after he was accused of stealing a woman's handbag, which he claimed was his own. In the mockumentary "Life Beyond The Box: Norman Stanley Fletcher", his real name is revealed as being Timothy Underwood, although in "Just Desserts" he appears to be addressed by a warder as Lewis. It is stated that he is now married to Trevor and living in Denmark.

== Jim McLaren ==
Jim "Jock" McLaren is played by Tony Osoba. Along with Godber and Warren, McLaren is a regular conspirator with and confidant of Fletcher. A mixed race young man from Greenock, Scotland, he claims to have been adopted. Subjected to racist abuse when he first arrived at Slade Prison, he was aggressive and hostile. Fletcher (who called him Jock) was tasked with enabling him to defeat such abuse and provocation, and to encourage his intelligence and resourcefulness. A keen football player (and fan of perennial Scottish League underdogs Greenock Morton), McLaren was soon turning out every Saturday afternoon for the inter-wing football matches. He is the last of their circle to be released, and Fletcher is seen bidding him farewell in the first episode of Going Straight. In "Life Beyond The Box: Norman Stanley Fletcher", McLaren is a member of the Scottish Parliament.

== "Bunny" Warren ==
"Bunny" Warren is played by Sam Kelly. Warren is a trusted friend of Fletcher, Godber and McLaren, and frequently joins in with their schemes. He was imprisoned for burglary, after being caught due to his inability to read a sign saying "Warning: burglar alarm". Fletcher and Godber frequently remark about his low intellect and Warren is self-conscious of his illiteracy, particularly his inability to read letters from his wife, and sometimes wistfully muses on his desire to (at least try to) learn "new things".

== Mr Mackay ==
Mr Mackay is played by Fulton Mackay. Mackay is a tough prison officer whose constant obsession in life is to catch Fletcher out. Mackay has the authority to make decisions affecting the entire wing, such as banning Christmas celebrations in the episode "No Way Out", so is presumably the wing's senior officer. Fletch's sly tactics in misdeeds ranging from fixing boxing matches, stealing pills from the prison doctor and eggs from the prison farmyard right through to finding new and imaginative ways to stick two fingers up at Mackay and get away with it, were specially designed to get up Mackay's nose. In return, Mackay's frenzied attempts to catch Fletch out, when fruitful, gave Mackay a level of smugness and satisfaction which was only accentuated by Fletch's hostility and skulking.

Born into a poor family, Mackay went on to be a drill sergeant (though in Going Straight this is changed to Warrant Officer Class 2) in the Argyll and Sutherland Highlanders, and ran a boarding house in Peebles with his wife, Marie, before joining the prison service. Mackay's temper is agitated by the constant suspicion he has of Fletcher, and his despair at the leniency of his optimistic, mild-mannered, kind-hearted colleague Mr Barrowclough. Mackay's homeland of Scotland serves as a constant source of entertainment for Fletcher, who describes him as a "charmless Celtic nurk" and is always on the lookout for an opportunity to antagonise Mackay. In one episode, Mackay asks Fletcher whether he felt he was working class. Fletcher responds, "I did, until I visited Glasgow. Now I think I'm middle class."

Mackay appears in the first episode of Going Straight, where it is revealed he has left Slade Prison after reaching the compulsory retirement age for prison officers. He shares the same train as Fletcher and the two end up crossing paths. Though they are initially hostile to each other when Fletcher realises that he has retired, Fletcher later inadvertently saves Mackay from accidentally getting involved in a criminal operation and framed. Mackay subsequently parts ways with Fletcher on better terms, and shakes his hand for the first and final time.

=== Medals ===
During the series, Mackay regularly wore his army service ribbons on his uniform: the General Service Medal 1918–1962, the Korea Medal, and the UN Korea Medal. For the film, this was inexplicably expanded to an additional row containing the 1939–1945 Star, the Defence Medal, the War Medal 1939–1945, and lastly the Jubilee Medal, 1977, which was awarded on the 25th anniversary of Elizabeth II's rule.

== Harris ==
Harris is a prisoner played by Ronald Lacey. A middle-aged Teddy Boy with a fish face and ginger hair, Harris is loathed by prison officers and prisoners alike. His sly manner, cowardice, and utter lack of integrity are accompanied by an insistently oleaginous manner and irritate even the easy-going Lukewarm and the emollient Mr Barrowclough. Harris is a thief, an activity taboo inside prison, and a cheat. He bullies those he perceives as weaker than him and is dominated by those above him, such as Harry Grout, Mr Mackay and Fletcher.

He was arrested following a botched attempt to steal an elderly lady's handbag. She had hidden a brick in it and then succeeded in pinning Harris down until the police arrived.

== Horrible Ives ==
Bernard "Horrible" Ives is a prisoner serving time in Slade for committing fraud. He was played by Ken Jones. Ives is a creep, a cheat and a snitch, universally loathed by the other inmates of Slade Prison. He originated from Liverpool. Almost all his spoken sentences begin with the words "'ere listen". Fletcher once commented "Ives is such a loser that if Elizabeth Taylor had triplets, he'd have been the one in the middle, on the bottle."

Ives is interviewed in the 2003 mockumentary Life Beyond the Box: Norman Stanley Fletcher. While most of the ex-prisoners interviewed are shown to have gone straight, Ives is shown collecting for a fake charity.

== Blanco Webb ==
Blanco Webb is played by David Jason. An elderly inmate, Blanco first appears in the episode "No Peace for the Wicked" where he helps Fletcher steal some Jaffa Cakes. He features heavily in the episode "Happy Release" where he and Fletcher are in adjacent beds in the prison hospital, Fletcher having broken his foot and Blanco having been diagnosed with a "tired heart". Also in the hospital is Norris (played by Colin Farrell), considered "scum" even by the other inmates, who had managed to con Blanco out of his only possessions: an antique silver snuff box, a Japanese wireless radio, and a musical box that played Waltzing Matilda when opened. Fletcher manages to reacquire Blanco's possessions with Godber's help, and manages to get Norris, newly released, re-arrested after only one day by tricking him into trying to dig for "treasure" underneath Leeds United's Elland Road pitch.

Throughout his lengthy prison sentence, Blanco continued to profess his innocence, and when parole was granted (in the episode "Pardon Me") he refused, preferring the prospect of dying in prison to that of admitting guilt. When he is finally granted a pardon, Fletcher warns him not to seek revenge on the person who really killed his wife. Blanco responds by telling Fletcher

No. I know 'im wot did it. It were the wife's lover. But don't worry, I shan't go round searching for him, 'e died years ago. That I do know. It were me that killed him!.

This however conflicts with the episode "No Peace for the Wicked", where it is implied that he was jailed for an armed robbery on a wages van.

David Jason would later star alongside Ronnie Barker in the sitcom Open All Hours.
