= Seven of One =

1973 British comedy television series

- "Open All Hours" and "Porridge" were the two successful pilots from the Seven of One series.
- Genre: Sitcom; Anthology
- Created by: Ronnie Barker
- Starring: Ronnie Barker
- Composer: Max Harris
- Country of origin: United Kingdom
- Original language: English
- No. of episodes: 7

Production
- Producers: Harold Snoad; Sydney Lotterby; James Gilbert
- Camera setup: Multi-camera
- Running time: 30 minutes
- Production company: BBC

Original release
- Network: BBC2
- Release: 25 March – 6 May 1973

Seven of One, stylised as 7 of 1, is a British sitcom anthology series that aired on BBC2 in 1973. Starring Ronnie Barker, Seven of One is a series of seven separate 30-minute episodes that would serve as possible pilots for sitcoms. Originally it was to be called Six of One, which Barker planned to follow up with another series called And Half a Dozen of the Other. This was a BBC equivalent of a similar showcase for London Weekend Television called Six Dates with Barker created in 1971.

In addition to Barker, Seven of One also featured Roy Castle, Bill Maynard, Talfryn Thomas, Prunella Scales, Glynn Edwards, Joan Sims, Keith Chegwin, Leslie Dwyer, Robin Parkinson, Sam Kelly, Christopher Biggins, Richard O'Callaghan, Yootha Joyce, David Jason, and Avis Bunnage in supporting roles. The series was released on BBC DVD in 2005.

== Episodes ==
No.	Title	Written by	Original release date
1	"Open All Hours"	Roy Clarke	25 March 1973
Arkwright has only one true love – money. He is also pursuing Nurse Gladys Emmanuel and continues to instruct his nephew Granville (David Jason) in the art of getting money out of customers. Granville, however, wants a girlfriend.
2	"Prisoner and Escort"	Dick Clement and Ian La Frenais	1 April 1973
Career criminal Norman Stanley Fletcher is on a train with prison officers Mr Mackay (Fulton Mackay), a martinet, and the kindly Mr Barraclough (Brian Wilde), on his way to serve a five-year sentence at Slade Prison.
3	"My Old Man"	Gerald Frow	8 April 1973
Sam Cobbett is a cantankerous, retired railwayman whose house is demolished by the council, forcing him to live in a tower block with his daughter Doris (Ann Beach) and her husband Arthur (Graham Armitage), whom he sees as posh and with whom there is mutual antagonism.
4	"Spanner's Eleven"	Roy Clarke	15 April 1973
Albert Spanners' life is tied to Ashfield Football Club – bottom of the league.
5	"Another Fine Mess"	Hugh Leonard	22 April 1973
When Harry and Sydney (Roy Castle) plan to impersonate Laurel and Hardy, it all gets a bit close to the real thing.
6	"One Man's Meat"	Jack Goetz	29 April 1973
Alan Joyce is a fat, greedy man whose wife (Prunella Scales) devises a plan to keep him off food for a day. She goes out and takes not only all the food from the house but Alan's clothes...
7	"I'll Fly You for a Quid"	Dick Clement and Ian La Frenais	6 May 1973
Grandpa Owen dies concealing a winning betting slip. His son Evan Owen and his gambling-mad family are desperate to prove that "you can't take it with you".

== Successful pilots ==
Whilst most of the pilots were not developed any further, "Prisoner and Escort" was chosen to be developed into a series and became Porridge (1974–1977), which also led to a spin-off series called Going Straight in 1978, a feature film adaptation of Porridge in 1979, and many years later a sequel sitcom Porridge (2016–2017).

"Open All Hours" was later developed into a sitcom of the same name, Open All Hours (1976, 1981–1982, 1985), and many years later a sequel sitcom named Still Open All Hours (2013–2019). Additionally, "My Old Man" also led to a sitcom of the same name, My Old Man (1974–1975), which was made by Yorkshire Television and shown nationally on ITV, but not including Barker and instead featuring an entirely new cast led by Clive Dunn.

Ronnie Barker's favourite of the seven pilots was "I'll Fly You for a Quid", which he initially chose to do as a series, before being convinced by the BBC that it would be harder to do a full series of scripts about Evan Owen in a Welsh gambling community compared to Norman Stanley Fletcher in the prison setting of "Prisoner and Escort".

== See also ==
- Six Dates with Barker
