= No Peace for the Wicked =

- Porridge episode
- Episode no.: Season 2 Episode 4
- Directed by: Sydney Lotterby
- Written by: Dick Clement and Ian La Frenais
- Original air date: 14 November 1975

Episode chronology
← Previous "Disturbing the Peace"	Next → "Happy Release"

"No Peace for the Wicked" is an episode of the British sitcom Porridge, made for the BBC. It first aired on 14 November 1975, and is the fourth episode of the second series. In this episode, Fletcher tries to have some peace during a weekend afternoon, but fails to achieve this.

== Synopsis ==
On a Saturday afternoon, while prisoners are enjoying some free time within Slade Prison, Fletcher decides to spend his lying on his bunk and reading his adult magazine. However, he finds himself unable to achieve peace as several of his friends visit him asking him to join their activities or loan them something. Just as he appears to have some peace, Fletcher notices that there is a wooden hobby horse in his cell, made by elderly prisoner Blanco Webb. As Fletcher is fond of Blanco, he acts kindly towards Blanco when he turns up with it and convinces him to use it as a distraction to a prison officer, so he can steal some snacks from him. Once the deed is done, Fletcher asks Blanco to pass the message that Fletcher is "incommunicado", but Blanco fails to grasp the concept.

The next person to disturb Fletcher's peace is prison officer Barrowclough, who disapproves of Fletcher lazing around and refuses his request to lock him in his cell. The men converse about the United States penal system, before Mr Barrowclough leaves to resume his patrol. Soon, prison officer Mackay arrives with a group of Home Office visitors who are inspecting the prison. Much to Fletcher's annoyance, the group fail to respect his privacy by asking about his views on prison life due to his criminal record.

Finding himself at breaking point, Fletcher prays to God to let him have some peace, as he fears he may not be responsible for his actions otherwise. Unfortunately, the prison chaplain chooses this moment to have a word with Fletcher, causing him to snap and assault the chaplain. Following the incident, Fletcher is brought before the governor for his actions, even though Fletcher insists in his defence that the chaplain was not seriously injured. As punishment, the governor places Fletcher in solitary confinement for three days. As he leaves, Fletcher asks for it to be extended to a fortnight as Mr Mackay prepares to drag him away.

== Episode cast ==
Actor	Role
Ronnie Barker	Norman Stanley Fletcher
Brian Wilde	Mr Barrowclough
Fulton Mackay	Mr Mackay
David Jason	Blanco
Sam Kelly	Warren
Tony Osoba	McLaren
Michael Barrington	Venables
Eric Dodson	Banyard
Ivor Roberts	Prison Visitor
Barbara New	Prison Visitor
Geoffrey Greenhill	Prison Visitor
Paul McDowell	Mr Collinson
Tony Aitken	Chaplain
