= Happy Release =

- Porridge episode
- Episode no.: Season 2 Episode 5
- Directed by: Sydney Lotterby
- Written by: Dick Clement and Ian La Frenais
- Original air date: 21 November 1975

Episode chronology
← Previous "No Peace for the Wicked"	Next → "The Harder They Fall"

"Happy Release" is an episode of the British sitcom Porridge, made for the BBC. It first aired on 21 November 1975, and is the fifth episode of the second series. In this episode, Fletcher concocts a scheme to help another prisoner get revenge on someone for cheating them of their possessions.

== Synopsis ==
Due to an accident caused by falling off a ladder, Fletcher is put in the prison infirmary with a broken ankle, much to the annoyance of prison officer Mackay, who had him down for drainage detail. Fletcher is joined in the infirmary by the elderly Blanco and the unpleasant Norris, both of whom are not speaking to each other. Whilst they are on their own, Blanco reveals to Fletcher that he suspects Norris of cheating in a game of nine-card brag that they had had, which resulted in Blanco losing his possessions as a result.

That night, Blanco informs Fletcher that if he dies before he is released from prison, he would bequeath to him a treasure map to the loot he stole. Norris overhears this and attempts to search Fletcher's bed for it. However, this attracts the attention of prison officer Barrowclough, who scolds Norris for causing trouble and jeopardising his upcoming parole. Although he attempts to find out what he was looking for, Barrowclough decides against this on the belief it was a diversion for prisoners to escape. The next morning, Norris makes a proposition to Fletcher and Blanco for the map, offering to look after it until they are released. Fletcher agrees, only if he can find the map.

After leaving the infirmary, Norris visits Godber, since he has been visiting with meals while on kitchen duty. Godber refuses to betray Fletcher when asked about taking anything from him with a piece of paper in it, but eventually hands over the map after Norris offers several valuable items for it. When Godber visits the infirmary on his next round, Fletcher takes delight that Norris fell for a dirty trick; the map was a fake, and the items he used to get it were those taken from Blanco. That night, the group listen to the news on Blanco's radio, which reports that Norris was arrested for digging up a football pitch in Leeds, much to their amusement.

== Episode cast ==
Actor	Role
Ronnie Barker	Norman Stanley Fletcher
Brian Wilde	Mr Barrowclough
Fulton Mackay	Mr Mackay
Richard Beckinsale	Godber
David Jason	Blanco
Colin Farrell	Norris
Terence Soall	Medical Officer
Paul McDowell	Mr Collinson
Steve Ismay	Gardener (uncredited)
