= Men Without Women (Porridge) =

- Porridge episode
- Episode no.: Season 1 Episode 6
- Directed by: Sydney Lotterby
- Written by: Dick Clement and Ian La Frenais
- Original air date: 10 October 1974

Episode chronology
← Previous "Ways and Means"	Next → "Just Desserts"

"Men Without Women" is an episode of the British sitcom Porridge, made for the BBC. It first aired on 10 October 1974, and is the final episode of the first series. In this episode, Fletcher offers his services as an agony aunt to his fellow inmates, but later has to return home when he learns he has marital problems.

== Synopsis ==
Fellow prisoner Warren visits Fletcher and asks him to read a letter from his wife due to Warren being dyslexic. Fletcher agrees and discovers that Warren's wife is questioning their marriage. That evening, he composes a response to the letter for Warren to send and offers a similar service to other prisoners with wives (in the case of Lukewarm, his homosexual partner) when he speaks to Warren about what he wrote, in exchange for payment in tobacco. A few days later, Warren brings another letter from his wife for Fletcher to read and learns that he has nothing to worry about. He thus becomes excited to see her on the upcoming visiting day, alongside the others whom Fletcher has been helping.

On visiting day, Fletcher is reunited with his daughter Ingrid, instead of his wife, and learns from her that she has met a new man. Learning of this, the prison governor agrees for Fletcher to receive temporary compassionate release for the weekend, in order to sort out his marital problems. Returning home to London, Fletcher is accompanied by an officer from the local station to ensure no domestic incidents occur, whereupon he celebrates seeing his wife and family after the officer leaves. Fletcher admits that he enjoys them tricking the prison service into giving him a few days out of prison on the grounds of marital issues, in order to savour some of the nicer things one can have on the weekend.

Fletcher swiftly spends his time wisely, watching a football match (Spurs at home), visiting the local pub, having a proper Sunday dinner, and enjoying soft toilet paper. However, with his time at home nearly up, Fletcher vows to his wife that his current prison sentence will be the last, as he feels like a father figure amongst the other prisoners at his age. Upon returning to Slade Prison that Sunday evening, Fletcher learns that the prisoners he helped have had issues, as their loved ones discovered that they received the same kind of letter, to which Fletcher taunts them to the fact he had spent an enjoyable weekend with his wife. As he relaxes in his cell, Mackay assumes that he has had a change in his attitude since returning when conversing with Barrowclough, only to see him reading a paper in his cell, before removing it from his hand to display a V-sign to Mackay.

== Episode cast ==
Actor	Role
Ronnie Barker	Norman Stanley Fletcher
Brian Wilde	Mr Barrowclough
Fulton Mackay	Mr Mackay
Sam Kelly	Warren
Brian Glover	Heslop
Michael Barrington	Governor
Christopher Biggins	Lukewarm
Royston Tickner	Sgt. Norris
Emlyn Price	Tolly
June Ellis	Isobel Fletcher
Patricia Brake	Ingrid Fletcher
Susan Littler	Norma
Andonia Katsaros	Iris
Rosalind Elliot	Elaine
Donald Groves	Trevor (uncredited)
