= Rough Justice (Porridge) =

- Porridge episode
- Episode no.: Season 3 Episode 3
- Directed by: Sydney Lotterby
- Written by: Dick Clement and Ian La Frenais
- Original air date: 4 March 1977

Episode chronology
← Previous "Poetic Justice"	Next → "Pardon Me"

"Rough Justice" is the third episode from the third series of the BBC sitcom Porridge, which aired on 4 March 1977. In the episode, Judge Rawley's watch is stolen, and the prisoners hold a kangaroo court with Harris as the suspect.

== Synopsis ==
The episode opens with Warren visiting Fletcher's cell wishing to have his love letters written by Rawley instead of Fletcher, as Rawley is an educated man. Fletcher insists on doing the job himself because Rawley is likely to write with sophisticated words, plus love letters are Fletcher's forte. Rawley arrives and says he will take up Warren's suggestion of helping out prisoners' family members with legal issues. However, Rawley refuses to accept any price for this, which Fletcher berates him for.

Harris returns from the pig farm with a horrible smell and a bad mood. The other prisoners mock him for his smell, but Harris is upset because he was relegated to the farm due to Rawley being given a clerical job. Fletcher tells Harris to "naff off" before getting to work on Warren's letter to his wife. Unfortunately, Fletcher writes "Rita" instead of Elaine, as he was thinking about Rita Hayworth at the time. Fletcher decides to cross out Rita and replace it with Errol Flynn. Just then, Rawley returns to the cell. Rawley comments that Harris was abusive to him, but the others say they will protect Rawley from further harassment. Rawley then says that he has grown to like and trust his fellow inmates, until he discovers his watch has been stolen. This causes the others to blame each other until they deduce that Harris was in the cell earlier and he must have taken it, due to his penchant for sneak thievery.

That night, Fletcher persuades Rawley to hold a kangaroo court with Rawley as the judge and Fletcher as the prosecutor. Fletcher reasons he has been in court enough times to know enough about legal procedure. Rawley is reluctant but agrees to go ahead.

The following day, they use the boiler room as the court room. Rawley is the judge, Fletcher is the prosecutor, Warren is the defence counsel and Godber is the witness. McLaren is the prisoner escort and roughly drags Harris into the room. Due to the fact Fletcher insisted on a proper enquiry, Rawley notes that the hearsay evidence would not be admissible in court and has no choice but to clear Harris. McLaren offers to extract a confession from Harris and, upon twisting his arm, Harris admits he stole the watch and promises to return it to Rawley.

That evening, Rawley informs Fletcher and Godber that his appeal was successful, and he is due to leave. During recreation time, Mr Mackay permits Rawley to bid farewell to the other inmates. Rawley thanks the men for accepting him and promises to be more open minded about the penal system. Rawley also gives Fletcher his watch as a parting gift. However, Harris had removed the mechanism from the watch, rendering it useless. The episode ends with a still of Fletcher angrily throwing the watch in the air.
