= Final Stretch (Porridge) =

- Porridge episode
- Episode no.: Series 3 Episode 6
- Directed by: Sydney Lotterby
- Written by: Dick Clement and Ian La Frenais
- Original air date: 25 March 1977

Episode chronology
← Previous "A Test of Character"	Next → —

"Final Stretch" is the final episode of the BBC sitcom Porridge, the sixth episode of the third series. It first aired on 25 March 1977. Godber's upcoming parole hearing is threatened by the prospect of a fight with fellow inmate Jarvis. Meanwhile, Fletcher is suspicious of his daughter's holiday plans.

== Synopsis ==
The episode opens during the prisoners' visiting hour. Fletcher’s daughter Ingrid tells him about her plans to go on holiday to Italy, which depresses him. Ingrid reassures Fletcher, reminding him that he only has just over a year left on his sentence.

Fletcher also learns that Ingrid and Godber have been keeping in touch as pen pals. Because Godber is to face the parole board in a week’s time, Fletcher suspects a relationship between him and Ingrid.

Later that day, a brawl takes place in the yard between Godber and convicted football hooligan Jarvis. Mr Barrowclough breaks up the fight and the two are brought before Mr Mackay. Godber and Jarvis pretend to be friends who were involved in "high spirits". Although they are let off with a warning, they challenge each other to another fight once out of earshot of the prison officers.

Fletcher criticises Godber for his poor judgement with his parole hearing imminent. Fletcher claims that if his parole hearing was close, he would not let any insult bother him. To further illustrate his point, Fletcher says that "turning the other cheek takes more bottle than fighting". However, Fletcher's main concern is that Jarvis is likely to seriously injure or even kill Godber.

During recreation hour, Jarvis goads Godber into another fight. Fletcher intervenes and lifts up the television set. Mackay orders everyone to stand still, and Fletcher pretends he was adjusting the set. However, the television now has a picture and Fletcher is forced to stand with it above his head while the other prisoners watch it.

That weekend, Fletcher decides he will have to confront Jarvis on Godber's behalf. It would mean Fletcher receiving solitary confinement and loss of remission, but Godber would be safe and have a clean record to take before the parole board.

In the yard, Fletcher confronts Jarvis and calls him "toilet mouth", but Jarvis laughs it off. Fletcher then makes a derogatory sexual joke about Jarvis' wife, but again Jarvis laughs it off. However, Jarvis tells the joke to Crusher, causing a fight between Crusher and Jarvis' gang. The guards break up the fight, and Fletcher thanks God.

Godber is approved for parole and thanks Fletcher for willing to sacrifice his own remission for him. Godber admits to Fletcher that the Jarvis affair was due to Jarvis making an obscene remark about Ingrid. Fletcher is pleased that Godber was defending his family honour. Before he leaves, Godber confirms Fletcher's suspicions by saying he is going on holiday to Italy "with a friend".

Just under three weeks after Godber's departure, Mr Mackay visits Fletcher. Mackay comments how Fletcher's attitude has changed since Godber's release and that a new inmate called Nicholson will be Fletcher's cellmate. Fletcher tells Mackay he intends to tell the inmate three things, but only shows Mackay two fingers, before showing three fingers. This was another opportunity for Fletcher to stick the fingers at Mackay and get away with it. The episode ends on a freeze frame of Fletcher showing Mackay three fingers.
