= Life Beyond the Box: Norman Stanley Fletcher =

- Genre: Mockumentary
- Directed by: Kim Flitcroft
- Starring: Ronnie Barker; Patricia Brake; Peter Vaughan
- Narrated by: Bill Nighy
- Country of origin: United Kingdom
- Original language: English

Production
- Running time: 50 minutes

Original release
- Network: BBC Two
- Release: 29 December 2003

Related
- Going Straight; Porridge (2016)

Life Beyond the Box: Norman Stanley Fletcher is a BBC Television comedy docudrama, narrated by Bill Nighy and broadcast in December 2003. It depicts the later life of Norman Stanley Fletcher, the main character in two earlier television series, Porridge and Going Straight.

== Synopsis ==
The film details Norman Stanley Fletcher's life over the 25 years since his release from Slade Prison. The majority of the programme features surviving members of the cast of the original series, in character, with Ronnie Barker appearing as Fletcher at the end of the programme.

The absence of Fletcher's naïve young cellmate Godber, played by Richard Beckinsale who died in 1979, is explained in a scene in which Fletcher's daughter Ingrid receives a phone call from Godber to say that he is stuck in traffic and will not be able to appear in the "documentary".

The film also featured "Whispering" Bob Harris (who was interviewed about a concert by Slade at Slade Prison), and Melvyn Bragg (who interviewed 'Genial' Harry Grout in connection with his autobiography).

Jim McLaren, played by Tony Osoba, is now a member of the Scottish Parliament.

== Cast ==
- Ronnie Barker as Norman Stanley Fletcher
- Patricia Brake as Ingrid Godber
- Peter Vaughan as 'Genial' Harry Grout
- Christopher Biggins as Lukewarm
- Ken Jones as Ives
- Sam Kelly as 'Bunny' Warren
- Tony Osoba as Jim McLaren
