= Prisoner and Escort =

- Porridge episode
- Directed by: James Gilbert
- Written by: Dick Clement and Ian La Frenais
- Original air date: 1 April 1973

Episode chronology
← Previous —	Next → "New Faces, Old Hands"

"Prisoner and Escort" is the pilot episode of the BBC sitcom Porridge. It was originally broadcast on 1 April 1973 as part of a series of pilot shows with the overall title Seven of One. In this episode, Norman Stanley Fletcher is transported from London to Slade Prison by Mr Mackay and Mr Barrowclough.

== Synopsis ==
The episode opens at St Pancras railway station, with a voice-over of the titular character Norman Stanley Fletcher being sentenced to five years in prison. When asked if he has anything to say before sentence is passed, the film jumps to Fletcher on a train saying "Cobblers". Fletcher soon finds out that his prison escort Mr Mackay is very strict and doesn't allow him to read his paper. Mr Barrowclough is softer, and tries to be friendly towards Fletcher. It turns out that Mr Mackay is unhappy about having to do a prison escort on New Year's Eve.

In the North of England, Mackay and Barrowclough take Fletcher into a prison van for the next part of their journey. It soon transpires that Slade Prison is in the middle of nowhere, miles away from the nearest village. Fletcher asks to use the bathroom, but Mackay does not allow this, as he is handcuffed to Fletcher. Mackay instead allows Fletcher to go quickly behind the van. Fletcher eyes up the fuel cap, implying that he is going to urinate in the petrol tank.

Later, their vehicle breaks down. Mackay goes for help, leaving Fletcher alone with Barrowclough. It soon gets dark, and Fletcher persuades Barrowclough to let them take shelter in a nearby cottage. Barrowclough is doubtful that the cottage is occupied, but Fletcher reassures Barrowclough that he is "only an experienced house-breaker after all".

At midnight, Fletcher and Barrowclough wish each other a happy new year. Fletcher offers Barrowclough some whisky, which he claims "fell out of Mr Mackay's pocket". They soon get drunk, and Fletcher persuades Barrowclough to take the handcuffs off him. With Barrowclough asleep, Fletcher attempts to escape. Due to the darkness, Fletcher goes round in circles, and is severely disappointed to discover that he ends up back at the cottage with Barrowclough. Fletcher pretends that he was going out for milk, but Barrowclough tells Fletcher that he could have got lost.

Finally, Fletcher arrives in Slade Prison, and Mackay informs Fletcher that the mechanic's report of the vehicle found something other than petrol in the tank. Mackay warns Fletcher he'll be keeping a close watch on Fletcher, but Barrowclough tells Fletcher that he is pleased because the Governor congratulated him on keeping his cool during a difficult situation. Barrowclough says he will do his best to help Fletcher out.

== Location ==
The outdoor scenes for this episode were filmed in South Wales rather than between London and Cumberland. The railway station was at Ystrad Mynach. The breakdown was filmed on the mountain road and a farm at Gelligaer.

== Episode Cast ==
Actor	Role
Ronnie Barker	Norman Stanley Fletcher
Fulton Mackay	Mr Jock Mackay
Brian Wilde	Mr Barrowclough
Hamish Roughead	Court Guard
