= Porridge (2016 TV series) =

British TV series (2016–2017)

- Genre: Sitcom
- Created by: Dick Clement; Ian La Frenais
- Written by: Dick Clement; Ian Le Frenais
- Directed by: Dominic Brigstocke
- Starring: Kevin Bishop; Dave Hill; Mark Bonnar; Dominic Coleman
- Composer: Max Harris
- Country of origin: United Kingdom
- Original language: English
- No. of series: 1
- No. of episodes: 7 (list of episodes)

Production
- Executive producers: Tarquin Gotch; Steven Canny
- Producer: Richard Webb
- Production location: Dock10
- Camera setup: Multi-camera
- Running time: 28 minutes
- Production company: BBC Studios

Original release
- Network: BBC One
- Release: 28 August 2016 – 10 November 2017

Porridge is a British television sitcom, starring Kevin Bishop, written by Dick Clement and Ian La Frenais and broadcast on BBC One. It is a sequel to (or reboot of) the original 1974 series of the same name, and its more immediate sequel Going Straight, both also written by Clement and La Frenais. The sitcom focuses on prison inmate Nigel Norman Fletcher (Kevin Bishop), who is sent to Wakeley Prison to serve a five-year sentence for cyber crimes. He is the grandson of Norman Stanley Fletcher, the central character in the original Porridge series.

Initially produced as a one-off special as part of the BBC's Landmark Sitcom Season in 2016, a full series followed the following year with the first episode broadcast on 6 October 2017.

== Premise ==
The central character is Nigel Norman Fletcher, a talented computer-specialist, who has been committed to the fictional Wakeley Prison in Hampshire to serve a five-year prison sentence for cyber crimes, the proceeds of which he used to support his now-ex-girlfriend's lifestyle. Much like his grandfather, Norman Stanley Fletcher, Nigel has his own personal opinions of criminal life that he likes to voice, though he considers himself to be an "uncommon criminal" as he has some regret of the actions he committed, and often seeks to avoid being caught up in illegal schemes that could endanger his well-being or add time to his sentence.

Like his grandfather, Fletcher has friends in prison, including his cell-mate, Joe Lotterby – a senior-but-veteran, old-time criminal who knew his grandfather and his old cell-mate Lennie Godber, and has a somewhat cynical view on life as a result of his previous sentences in prison – and contends with two prison officers: Mr Meekie and Mr Braithwaite, respectively similar in personality to the officers Mr Mackay and Mr Barrowclough from the original series.

== Cast ==
- Kevin Bishop as Nigel Norman Fletcher
- Dave Hill as Joe Lotterby
- Mark Bonnar as Mr Meekie
- Dominic Coleman as Mr Braithwaite
- Harry Peacock as Dougie Parfitt
- Ricky Grover as Scudds
- Jason Barnett as Shel
- Harman Singh as Aziz
- Colin Hoult as Barry
- Daniel Fearn as Ullett
- Rory Gallagher as Loomis
- Pippa Haywood as Governor Hallwood
- Zahra Ahmadi as Dr Marsden
- Caolan Byrne as Culhane

For the one-off special, Colin McFarlane portrayed the character of The Judge, who sentences Fletcher for his crimes. As a nod to the original series, the narration given in the opening titles is voiced by McFarlane.

Joe Lotterby tells Fletcher that he served time at Slade Prison during the 1970s alongside Norman Stanley Fletcher. In the 1979 film version of the original series, a character named Lotterby, played by Zoot Money, works in the kitchens at Slade alongside Godber. Both characters are named after Sydney Lotterby, the producer of the original series.

== Production ==
In March 2016, it was announced that a sequel pilot to Porridge would air as part of the BBC's Landmark Sitcom Season, starring Kevin Bishop as Norman Stanley Fletcher's grandson and written by the original writers Dick Clement and Ian La Frenais.

In October 2016, BBC One commissioned the show for a full series which went into production in January 2017. The BBC later confirmed there were no plans for a second series.

== Episodes ==
Seven episodes of Porridge, all written by Dick Clement and Ian La Frenais, were produced for the BBC. The show began airing on 28 August 2016 and ended on 10 November 2017. All episodes had a running time of 30 minutes.

== Reception ==
A review for The Guardian described the series as "a throwback, nostalgic at best, but more likely just lame".
