= John Dair =

Scottish actor (1933–2005)

- Born: 3 March 1933; Dundee, Angus, Scotland
- Died: 25 November 2005 (aged 72); London, England
- Occupation: Actor
- Spouse: Gina Dair (m. 1957–2005)
- Children: 4

John Dair (3 March 1933 – 25 November 2005) was a Scottish actor who was best known for his role as Harry Grout's bodyguard "Crusher" in the sitcom Porridge, and as Charlie Dawson in the drama Our Friends in the North.

Although born in Dundee, Scotland, Dair lived in London, England, for many years.

He drove mobile cranes and bulldozers on building sites, and then worked as a singer until he was offered the part in Porridge whilst performing at the Lyceum Theatre, London. He appeared in one of the most memorable scenes in the sitcom in which his character displays a "sense of humour failure" when a joke is repeated to him. He had small parts in films, the most memorable of which was in Batman as crime boss Vinnie Ricorso, who is fatally stabbed in the throat with a quill pen by the Joker.

In 1984, he appeared in the music video for the Frankie Goes to Hollywood song "Relax" as a man dressed as a Roman emperor in a gay nightclub, and also had a part as a gambler in their No.1 selling single "Two Tribes" video directed by Godley & Creme. He also appeared in commercials including the acclaimed 1985 advertisement for Levi Strauss & Co. jeans with Nick Kamen that was set in a laundromat. Dair died of lung cancer in 2005.

== Filmography ==
Year	Title	Role	Notes
1979	Porridge	Crusher	
1983	Yellowbeard	Big John	
1989	Batman	Vinnie Ricorso	
1990	Chicago Joe and the Showgirl	John	
1991	Hear My Song	Derek	
1996	Loch Ness	Macleish	
1999	Captain Jack	1st Quaker Man	(final film role)
