= The Old Boy Network =

- Genre: Comedy
- Written by: Dick Clement; Ian La Frenais
- Directed by: Sydney Lotterby
- Starring: Tom Conti; John Standing
- Country of origin: United Kingdom
- Original language: English
- No. of series: 1
- No. of episodes: 7

Production
- Producers: Tony Charles; Sydney Lotterby; Allan McKeown; Brian True-May
- Running time: 25 minutes
- Production company: SelecTV

Original release
- Network: ITV
- Release: 16 February – 29 March 1992

The Old Boy Network is a British comedy television series which first aired on ITV in 1992. Created by the writing team of Dick Clement and Ian La Frenais, it is a parody of various spy films and series.

== Main cast ==
- Tom Conti as Lucas Frye (7 episodes)
- John Standing as Peter Duckham (7 episodes)
- Robert Lang as Sir Roland White (6 episodes)
- Georgia Allen as Tamsin (5 episodes)
- Jayne Brook as Parker Morrow (4 episodes)
- Annie Lambert as Sophie Duckham (2 episodes)
- Brian Miller as Percy (2 episodes)
- Richard Syms as Munton (2 episodes)

== Bibliography ==
- Horace Newcomb. Encyclopedia of Television. Routledge, 2014.
