= Mann's Best Friends =

- Genre: Sitcom
- Written by: Roy Clarke
- Directed by: Derrick Goodwin
- Starring: Fulton Mackay; Barry Stanton; Bernard Bresslaw
- Country of origin: United Kingdom
- Original language: English
- No. of series: 1
- No. of episodes: 6

Production
- Producer: Derrick Goodwin
- Running time: 30 minutes
- Production company: Thames Television

Original release
- Network: Channel 4
- Release: 15 April – 20 May 1985

Mann's Best Friends is a British television sitcom which first aired on Channel 4 in 1985 It is set in a boarding house where the easy-going landlord fails to control the antics of his chaotic tenants, leading him to seek the assistance of the domineering Hamish James Ordway who has recently retired from the Water Board.

== Main cast ==
- Fulton Mackay as Hamish James Ordway
- Barry Stanton as Henry Mann
- Bernard Bresslaw as Duncan
- Barbara Hicks as Mrs. Mann
- Patricia Brake as Dolly Delights
- Clive Merrison as Irvin
- Liz Smith as Mrs. Anstruther
- Sara Corper as Phoebe
- Reginald Marsh as Mr. Beasley (1 episode)
- Rebecca Lacey as Receptionist (1 episode)

== Bibliography ==
- Maxford, Howard. Hammer Complete: The Films, the Personnel, the Company. McFarland, 2018.
