= Ken Jones (actor) =

English actor (1930–2014)

- Born: Kenneth J Jones; 20 February 1930; Liverpool, England
- Died: 13 February 2014 (aged 83); Prescot, Merseyside, England
- Years active: 1964–2014
- Spouse: Sheila Fay (m. 1964; died 2013)

Kenneth J Jones (20 February 1930 – 13 February 2014) was an English actor.

Jones was born in Liverpool. After working as a signwriter and performing as an amateur, he trained at RADA. Known for his roles as ''orrible' Ives in Porridge and as Rex in The Squirrels, he also appeared in The Liver Birds as Uncle Dermot, in Goodnight Sweetheart as Owen Jones, and in Seconds Out as Dave Locket.

== Personal life ==
Jones was married to the actress Sheila Fay, also a native of Liverpool, from 30 October 1964 until her death on 31 August 2013. He died from bowel cancer on 13 February 2014 in a nursing home in Prescot.

== Filmography ==
=== Film ===
Year	Title	Role
1969	The File of the Golden Goose	Stroud
1971	Melody	Mr Dicks
1971	Gumshoe	Labour Exchange Clerk
1979	Murder by Decree	Dock Guard
1979	Porridge	Ives
1985	No Surrender	Ronny
1994	Stanley's Dragon	Millington
1996	Jude	Mr Biles

=== Television ===
Year	Title	Role	Notes
1962–1974	Z-Cars	Various	24 episodes
1963–64	ITV Play of the Week	Garret / Reg	2 episodes
1963–1972	Dixon of Dock Green	Various	5 episodes
1964	The Chase	Frank Bowles	TV film
1964–65	No Hiding Place	Luggy Carter / Brooks	Episodes: "Play on Letters", "Truth or Dare"
1965	Theatre 625	Kelly	Episode: "Progress to the Park"
1965	R3	Eric	Episode: "And No Birds Sing"
1965–1969	The Wednesday Play	Various	Guest roles (7 episodes)
1966	United!	Arthur Hackforth	Recurring role (18 episodes)
1966, 1972	Thirty Minute Theatre	Freddie / Ted Humphries	2 episodes
1966, 1972	Play of the Month	Totmark / Sgt. Lugg	2 episodes
1967	Coronation Street	Harry Eastham	Episode: "1.661"
1967, 1970	Armchair Theatre	Mr Budge / Rickie	2 episodes
1968	The First Lady	Woodley	Episode: "Ministry Approved"
1968	Softly Softly	Henderson	Episode: "Red Herring"
1968	The Golden Vision	Joe	The Wednesday Play
1968–69	Her Majesty's Pleasure	Leslie Mills	TV series
1969	ITV Sunday Night Theatre	Alf	Episode: "Hazel and Her New Gas Cooker"
1969	Wink to Me Only	Jack	Episode: "The Council Wears Earrings"
1969	The Expert	Walker	Episode: "No Home in the City"
1970	Germinal	Rasseneur	TV miniseries
1970	W. Somerset Maugham	Horn	Episode: "Rain"
1970	Scene	Mr Potter	Episode: "£60 Single, £100 Return"
1970	Grady	John Dayton	Episode: "Look, I'm Nobody"
1970–71	Coronation Street	Arthur Burrows	Guest role (4 episodes)
1971	Long Voyage Out of War	Andy Ipps	Episode: "The Gentle Invasion"
1971	The Guardians	Sam Wilson	Episode: "The Logical Approach"
1971–72	The Last of the Baskets	Clifford Basket	Main role
1972	The Liver Birds	Uncle Dermot	4 episodes
1972	The Adventures of Black Beauty	Mr Fox	Episode: "The Horsemen"
1973	Look and Read	Mr. West	Serial: "Joe and the Sheep Rustlers"
1973	Owen, M.D.	Ivor Bevan	Episode: "September Song!"
1973	Hunter's Walk	Philips	Episode: "The Old Folks at Home"
1974	Thriller	Sam	Episode: "I'm the Girl He Wants to Kill"
1974	Boy Dominic	Samuel Weatherbane	3 episodes
1974–75	Porridge	Bernard 'Horrible' Ives	4 episodes
1974–1977	The Squirrels	Rex	Main role
1975	The Wackers	Billy Clarkson	TV series
1977	Jesus of Nazareth	Jotham	2 episodes
1978	Rumpole of the Bailey	Charlie Wheeler	Episode: "Rumpole and the Learned Friends"
1979	All Day on the Sands	Mr Cattley	TV film
1980	The Nesbitts Are Coming	Det. Sgt. Arnold Nixon	TV series
1981	Dangerous Davies: The Last Detective	Mr Norris	TV film
1981–82	Seconds Out	Dave Locket	TV series
1982	Dead Ernest	Archangel Derek	Main role
1983–84	Struggle	Stanley	Episodes: "One Step Forward Two Steps Back", "Art for the Workers' Sake"
1985	Behind the Bike Sheds	Whistle Willie	TV series
1986	That Uncertain Feeling	Salter	Episode: "1.3"
1986	Prospects	Mr Lambert	Episode: "Running All the Way: Part 1"
1987	Imaginary Friends	Ed Novar	TV miniseries
1987–88	Valentine Park	Tom	TV series
1988	Turn on to T-Bag	Prof. Sparkes	Episodes: "Sparkes", "Turn on to T-Bag"
1989	Act of Will	Dr Stalkey	Episode: "1.1"
1989	Boon	Ben Seymour	Episode: "All in a Day's Pork"
1991	Watching	Uncle Bernard	Episodes: "Wining", "Fixing", "Straying"
1996	Goodnight Sweetheart	Owen Jones	Episode: "It's a Sin to Tell a Lie"
1996	The Detectives	King Harold	Episode: "Fur Coat, No Knickers"
1996	Murder Most Horrid	Mr Belling	Episode: "The Body Politic"
1996	Peak Practice	Edward Fellows	Episode: "A New Life"
1996, 2000	Casualty	Len Chesham / George Bryant	2 episodes
1997–98	Out of Sight	Grandad	2 episodes
1998	Mosley	J. H. Thomas	2 episodes
1998	A Certain Justice	Harry Naughton	3 episodes
2000, 2007	Doctors	Ken / Roy Balcombe	2 episodes
2003	Life Beyond the Box: Norman Stanley Fletcher	Bernard Ives	TV film
2005	The 4400	Matthew Lombard	Episode: "The Fifth Page"
