= Patricia Brake =

English actress (1942–2022)

- Born: Patricia Ann Brake; 25 June 1942; Bath, Somerset, England
- Died: 28 May 2022 (aged 79)
- Occupation: Actress
- Years active: 1960–2020
- Spouses: Robert McBain (m. 1966; div. 1978) Michael Kennedy (m. 1997; died 2011)
- Children: 3

Patricia Ann Kennedy (25 June 1942 – 28 May 2022), better known by her stage name Patricia Brake, was an English actress. Her credits include Lorna Doone (1963), The Ugliest Girl in Town (1968-1969), My Lover, My Son (1970), The Optimists of Nine Elms (1973), Emmerdale (1975), Nicholas Nickleby (1977), A Sharp Intake of Breath (1977), EastEnders (2004), and Coronation Street (2005-2006). She was most notable for her role as Ingrid Fletcher, eldest daughter of Norman Stanley Fletcher, in the BBC sitcom Porridge (1974-1977), and its sequel Going Straight (1978), and for starring as Gwen Lockhead in 128 episodes of Eldorado (1992-1993).

== Early life ==
Brake was born in Bath on 25 June 1942, the daughter of Victor Brake, a butcher, and Doreen Brake (née Wilkey). She was educated at the City of Bath Girls' School, and beginning at age 16, she trained at the Bristol Old Vic Theatre School, before joining the Salisbury Playhouse for two years, from 1960 to 1961. She moved then to Harrogate for a year, where she was a member of the White Rose Players.

== Career ==
She joined the Royal Shakespeare Company where (among other roles) she played Hermia in a production of A Midsummer Night's Dream, directed by Peter Hall, which also featured Judi Dench, Diana Rigg, Ian Richardson and Ian Holm. This was followed by a period in the West End.

She began appearing on television in such series as Lorna Doone (1963), The Ugliest Girl in Town (1968-1969), Nicholas Nickleby (1977), and A Sharp Intake of Breath (1977) with David Jason, and also had film roles in My Lover, My Son (1970), The Optimists of Nine Elms (1973).

Brake played Ingrid Fletcher, the daughter of Norman Stanley Fletcher, in the BBC sitcom Porridge (1974-1977), and its sequel Going Straight (1978). In 2015, she guest-starred in the BBC ongoing drama Casualty and in Midsomer Murders for ITV.

Alongside her extensive body of work in West End theatres, she also appeared in UK soaps Emmerdale (1975), EastEnders (2004), Coronation Street (2005-2006), and starred in 128 episodes of Eldorado (1992-1993).

== Personal life ==
Brake married actor Robert McBain in 1966. She adopted his son from a previous marriage and after they had two further children, they divorced in 1978. She married Michael Kennedy in 1997, gaining two stepchildren; he died in 2011. Brake died from cancer on 28 May 2022, aged 79.

== Acting roles ==
Year	Title	Role
2020	Manhunt	Edith Cloves
2020	Truth Seekers – The Haunting of Connelly's Nook	Miss Connelly
2019	Defending the Guilty – #1.3	Annie Scott
2018	Casualty – #32.40	Margaret McDale
2015	Casualty – The Department of Secrets	Lola Brightwell
2014	Midsomer Murders – Let Us Prey	Stella Spencer
2012	Doctors	Patti Sylvester
2010	Love/Loss	Millie
2008	Holby City – Stolen	Heather Clegg
2005–2006	Coronation Street	Viv Baldwin
2004	EastEnders	Deirdre Foster
2003	Life Beyond the Box: Norman Stanley Fletcher	Ingrid Godber
2001	McCready and Daughter – The Dating Game	Barbara Graham
2000	Midsomer Murders – Beyond the Grave	Anne Quarritch
1998	Looking After Jo Jo	Doro
1995	The Upper Hand – 2 episodes	Peggy Thatcher
1992–1993	Eldorado - 128 episodes	Gwen Lockhead
1991	Stay Lucky – Shingle Beach	Tanya
1991	2point4 Children – Saturday Night and Sunday Morning	Tina
1990	The Bill – Decisions	Irene
1990	Campion – Dancers in Mourning: Part 1	Chole Pye
1988	Singles	Di
1985–1986	Troubles and Strife	Cherry
1985	Mann's Best Friends	Doll Delights
1982	Only When I Laugh	Hilary
1980	Keep It in the Family	Ann
1978–1979	The Glums	Eth
1978	Going Straight	Ingrid Fletcher
1977	Nicholas Nickleby	Madeline Bray
1976	Forget-Me-Not	Pat Powell
1976	The Picnic	The Maid
1975	Emmerdale Farm	Sarah Foster
1974–1977	Porridge	Ingrid Fletcher
1974–1975	Second Time Around	Vicki
1973	The Optimists of Nine Elms	Dogs Home Secretary
1970	My Lover, My Son	Julie
1968–1969	The Ugliest Girl in Town	Julie Renfield
1967	Inheritance	Susie Morcer
1966	This Man Craig	Joyce Marino
1965	Love Story	Yvonne
1963	Lorna Doone	Gwenny Carfax
1963	No Hiding Place	Cathy Kennedy
1961	Home Tonight	Dot Sutton
1960	Emergency Ward 10	Nell Ritchie
