= Dave Hill (actor) =

British actor

- Born: David Hill; Skipton, North Yorkshire, England, UK
- Occupation: Actor
- Years active: 1967–present

David Hill is a British actor. He was born in Skipton, North Yorkshire, where he attended Ermysted's Grammar School for boys. He has appeared in The Full Monty and many other films and TV series. He played Bert Atkinson in EastEnders from 2006 to 2007 and in 2017.

== Filmography ==
- Man of Straw - Napoleon Fischer
- The Sweeney (1976, TV series) - Shaylor
- The Duellists (1977) - Cuirassier
- Going Straight episode 3 (1978)
- Oppenheimer (1980, TV mini-series) - James Tuck
- Britannia Hospital (1982) - Jeff
- The Draughtsman's Contract (1982) - Mr Herbert / Mrs Herbert's husband
- Remembrance (1982) - Paul
- Bergerac (1983) Se2Ep6
- Invitation to the Wedding (1985) - Higson
- Turtle Diary (1985) - taxi driver (uncredited)
- Car Trouble (1986) - Bill
- The Nature of the Beast (1988) - Oggy
- The Raggedy Rawney (1988) - Lamb
- The Most Dangerous Man in the World (1988) - Ahmet
- Georg Elser - Einer aus Deutschland (1989) - Precinct Chief
- All Creatures Great and Small (1989, TV series) - Bert Longshaw
- The Bill (1989–2005, TV series) - Sgt Harry Haynes / Harry Fletcher / William Hanley / B.T.P.C. Reighson / Mr. Edge
- Harry Enfield's Television Programme (1990, TV series) - Freddie
- In Fading Light (1991) - Alfie Olsen
- Grange Hill (1991, TV series) - Steven Farrington-Booth
- Heartbeat (1993, TV series) - Eric Bradshaw
- London's Burning (1993, TV series) - Charlie Ross
- Pie in the Sky (1994, TV series) - Brian Perkins
- Mike and Angelo (1994, TV series) - Ralph Dimpey
- Paradise (1994, TV series) - Joseph
- Seaforth (1994, TV mini-series) - Andy
- Peak Practice (1995, TV series) - Phil Cullman
- Game On (1995, TV series) - Ron Grimshaw
- Cracker (1995, TV series) - Mr. Franklin
- Circles of Deceit (1995, TV movie) - Andy
- When Saturday Comes (1996) - Fred
- Chef! (1996, TV series) - Cyril Bryson
- Black Eyes (1996) - Security Guard
- The Ice House (1997, TV mini-series) - Fred Phillips
- Dalziel and Pascoe (1997, TV series) - Arnie Bancroft
- The Full Monty (1997) - Alan
- Swept from the Sea (1997) - Jack Vincent
- City Central (1998–2000, TV series) - PC Pete Redfern
- Take a Girl Like You (2000) - Mr. Bunn
- There's Only One Jimmy Grimble (2000) - United Scout
- The Gentleman Thief (2001, TV movie) - Frank Banning
- Bob & Rose (2001, TV series) - Trevor Gadds
- Linda Green (2001–2002, TV series) - Frank Green
- In Denial of Murder (2004, TV movie) - Norman Taylor
- My Life as a Popat (2004, TV series) - Alf Saviour
- Bad Girls (2005, TV series) - Ron
- Rocket Man (2005, TV mini-series) - Huw Masters
- New Tricks (2006, TV series) - Brendan Dyer
- EastEnders (2006–07, 2017, soap opera) - Bert Atkinson
- Place of Execution (2008, TV mini-series) - Old Tommy Clough
- Doc Martin (2009, TV series) - Jim Selkirk
- Skins (2011–2012, TV series) - Dewi
- Sixteen (2013) - Gerry
- Vera (2014, TV series) - Larry Crowe
- The Mill (2014, TV series) - Abraham Whittaker
- Mad Max (2015)
- Metal Gear Solid V: The Phantom Pain (2015)
- Holby City (2016, TV series) - Sinclair Sheridan
- Porridge (2017, TV mini-series) - Joe Lotterby
- All Creatures Great and Small (2020, TV series) - Bert Chapman
