= Tony Osoba =

British actor (born 1947)

- Born: 15 March 1947 (age 79); Maryhill, Glasgow, Scotland
- Education: Royal Scottish Academy of Music and Drama
- Occupation: Actor
- Years active: 1973–present
- Spouse: Sally Wignall (m. 1989)

Tony Osoba (born 15 March 1947) is a Scottish actor best known for his role as Jim 'Jock' McLaren in the 1970s British sitcom Porridge alongside Ronnie Barker. He also guest starred in the first episode of the spin-off Going Straight. Osoba was the first mixed-race Scottish actor to appear on primetime television when he appeared in the series.

Since then, he has appeared twice in Coronation Street, first as Wesley McGregor in 1982, and secondly as Mike Baldwin's boss Peter Ingram for a few episodes in 1990, before the character was killed off. He also starred as Chas Jarvis in Dempsey and Makepeace.

== Early life ==
Osoba was born in Maryhill, Glasgow, Scotland and was partly of native Scottish and Nigerian descent, and had an early ambition to design cars; upon realising the employment opportunities in that field were limited, he decided to become an actor. After completing his Highers, he trained at the Royal Scottish Academy of Music and Drama.

== Career ==
Osoba after graduating college joined a theatre company in Richmond, toured abroad and was a member of the Royal Shakespeare Company.

His television roles include Det. Sgt. Charles 'Chas' Jarvis in Dempsey and Makepeace (1984–1986) and both Wesley McGregor and Peter Ingram in Coronation Street (1982 and 1990). He has also appeared in Space: 1999 (1976), The Professionals (1978), Charles Endell Esq (1979), Minder (1980), The Flame Trees of Thika (1981), Tales of the Unexpected (1982), Bergerac (1983), Between the Lines (1994), Taggart (1999) and Dinotopia (2002) as well as three appearances in Doctor Who in the stories "Destiny of the Daleks" (1979), "Dragonfire" (1987) and "Kill the Moon" (2014). His film career includes roles in Pure as a Lily (1976), the film version of Porridge (US: Doing Time, 1979), Game for Vultures (1979), and Who Dares Wins (1982).

In 2005, Osoba starred as the Kralahome in a touring production of The King and I. Later credits include the 2007 film Tanner, as Superintendent Smith in Hollyoaks and Charlie Dokes in The Bill. In 2011 Osoba made a brief appearance in an episode of The Shadow Line.

Osoba has also appeared in one radio series, Space Force (1984–1985), as Loderick Sincere.

== Filmography ==
Year	Title	Role	Notes
1974–77	Porridge	Jim "Jock" McLaren	9 episodes
1976	Pure as a Lily	Othello	
1976	Space: 1999		Episode: "Space Warp"
1978	Going Straight	Jim "Jock" McLaren	Episode 1, "Going Home"
1978	The Professionals	Martin Taylor	Series 1, Episode 10, "Stakeout"
1979	Game for Vultures	Daniel Batten	
1979	Porridge	McClaren	
1979, 1987, 2014	Doctor Who	Lan / Kracauer/Duke	"Destiny of the Daleks", "Dragonfire", "Kill the Moon"
1980	Charles Endell Esquire	Hamish McIntyre Jr.	6 episodes
1980	Minder	Pearce	
1982	Who Dares Wins	Terrorist #5	
1982, 1990	Coronation Street	Wesley McGregor / Peter Ingram	14 episodes
1983	Bergerac	Eddie McCord	Series 3, Episode 5, "Come Out Fighting"
1984, 1986	Dempsey & Makepeace	Detective Sergeant Charles ”Chas" Jarvis	30 episodes
1990	Making News	Freddie	6 episodes
1998	The Demon Headmaster	Smith	6 episodes
2000	Arabian Nights	Sultan Badr Al-Din	
2003	Life Beyond the Box: Norman Stanley Fletcher	Jim McLaren	
2007	Tanner	Archie Richmond	
2014	Planetfall	A.I. Computer	
