= Porridge (film) =

1979 British comedy film by Dick Clement

- Theatrical poster
- Directed by: Dick Clement
- Written by: Dick Clement; Ian La Frenais
- Produced by: Ian La Frenais
- Starring: Ronnie Barker; Richard Beckinsale; Fulton Mackay; Brian Wilde; Peter Vaughan; Sam Kelly; Barrie Rutter; Daniel Peacock; Christopher Godwin; Geoffrey Bayldon
- Cinematography: Bob Huke
- Edited by: Alan Jones
- Music by: Joe Brown
- Production companies: Black Lion Films; WitzEnd Productions
- Distributed by: ITC Films
- Release date: 19 July 1979 (London)
- Running time: 93 minutes
- Country: United Kingdom
- Language: English
- Budget: £250,000
- Box office: £313,747 (UK)

Porridge (American title: Doing Time) is a 1979 British comedy film directed by Dick Clement and starring Ronnie Barker, Richard Beckinsale, Fulton Mackay and Brian Wilde. It was written by Clement and Ian La Frenais based on their BBC television series Porridge (1974–1977). Most of prison officers and inmates from the original series appear in the film, with the notable exceptions of Lukewarm, Blanco, Heslop and Harris. There is also a different governor, played by Geoffrey Bayldon rather than series regular Michael Barrington.

The film, set a year before the final episode of the TV series, includes one of the last appearances by Richard Beckinsale, the actor who played Godber. He died in March 1979, a few weeks after its completion.

== Plot ==
Slade Prison has two new inmates: Rudge, a nervous first offender, and Oakes, an armed robber. Rudge is assigned a job on the prison farm alongside Fletcher, known as Fletch, who takes him under his wing. Oakes approaches the prison's Mr Big, "Genial" Harry Grout, also known as Grouty, and using a cut from his last job before being caught, asks for his escape to be arranged. Grouty sets the price, then begins making arrangements.

Grouty starts by forcing Fletch to persuade the prison governor to allow an inmates-versus-celebrities football match, to boost prisoner morale and "put Slade on the map". Fletch successfully manipulates new prison officer Mr Beal to make the suggestion to Principal Officer Mr Mackay, who approaches the governor, and the football match is approved, although all three claim the idea was theirs alone. Fletch then becomes the prison team's manager; Grouty insists that Oakes be on the team.

The celebrity team arrives in a coach. The prisoners are notably underwhelmed when it is explained that their hopes for one of The Goodies on the team have not been met, the nearest they have to a famous face being a weather presenter from Anglia Television. During the match, Oakes feigns an injury and is taken to the changing rooms where he meets the coach driver; revealed as an accomplice. They exchange clothes and Oakes ties the coach driver up to throw off any suspicion. Shortly afterwards, Fletch's cellmate Godber is concussed on the field so Fletch takes him to the changing rooms, where he sees the ruse unfolding. Taking no chances, Oakes, now disguised as the coach driver, forces Fletch and a dazed Godber into the coach's luggage compartment at gunpoint then drives out of the prison under the guise of refuelling the coach.

Out in the country, Oakes meets further accomplices and abandons the coach; they drive Fletch and Godber away in a motorhome. Meanwhile, the prison officers have discovered the escape: the police and the Home Office are informed, both searching for the coach, though the prison officers' attempt to help is not met well by with police, as no-one can explain how they let three inmates drive out of the gates. Fletch tells Oakes that they do not want to escape as he and Godber only have a short time left to serve, and that they will not tell anyone about Oakes's plan because of the "Them and Us" culture in the prison.

Oakes relents and releases them and they find a barn to hide in and catch their breath; Godber recovers from his bang on the head and they help themselves to some apples. Fletch explains to Godber that there is no possible way that being caught outside ends well for them, as any policeman they approach will claim the find for himself. Furthermore, he realises that once the governor, Mackay and Beal start passing the idea of the match back down the line, it will end up with Fletch looking like the responsible one and he will serve more time, meaning the only solution is to break back into prison.

Making their way through fields and villages, they steal a sexton's bicycle, find the abandoned coach and manage to sneak back into the luggage hatch just as the police let the prison officers take it back to the prison. Once inside the prison walls, both convicts slip out of the coach and smuggle themselves into the prison officers' club storeroom, where Fletch quickly consumes several bottles of alcohol to become inebriated enough to make their story be accepted: they stumbled on Oakes tying up the bus driver and he forced them down the delivery hatch, where they claim to have been since.

The story is believed by the governor and life seems to return to normal. As the other inmates question Fletch on what really happened, Grouty subtly tells him that he will be rewarded for his efforts and for keeping his mouth shut, and Rudge thanks Fletch for helping him through his time inside. Later in their cell, Godber is jealous at Oakes having got away, though Fletch assures him that it will not matter as Oakes will hate being on the run. Fletch reminds Godber that in a few months he will leave prison as well, the difference being that he will be doing it legally.

Mackay visits them and tells them that, while the governor believes that they have been locked in the storeroom all day, it does not explain the mysterious "UFO" sightings in the village (unidentified fleeing objects), and the various happenings that they created on their journey. Realising that he will never be believed, Mackay tells them that he will always be watching, and that his day will come. Fletch and Godber cheekily munch on the stolen apples once Mackay turns his back to them.

== Cast ==
- Ronnie Barker as Norman Stanley Fletcher
- Richard Beckinsale as Lennie Godber
- Fulton Mackay as Mr Mackay
- Brian Wilde as Mr Barrowclough
- Peter Vaughan as "Genial" Harry Grout/Grouty
- Geoffrey Bayldon as Mr Treadaway, the Governor
- Christopher Godwin as Mr Beal
- Barrie Rutter as Oakes
- Daniel Peacock as Rudge
- Sam Kelly as "Bunny" Warren
- Julian Holloway as Bainbridge
- Ken Jones as "Horrible" Ives
- Philip Locke as Mr Banyard
- John Barrett as Hedley
- Gorden Kaye as Dines (coach driver)
- Karl Howman as Urquhart
- Derek Deadman as Cooper
- Tony Osoba as Jim "Jock" McLaren
- Oliver Smith as McMillan
- Zoot Money as Lotterby
- Duncan Preston as the weatherman
- Jackie Pallo Jr as Jacko
- Paul McDowell as Mr Collinson

== Production ==
Unlike the television episodes, the film is not a BBC production and although there is a line that mentions the escape unfolding on the BBC, there are no references to the corporation on the DVD release (2003). Instead, the DVD was produced by ITV Studios. In order for the rights to be granted to ITC Entertainment for the production, an agreement was reached that the BBC would have the initial television rights to the film. It made its TV premiere on BBC1 on New Year's Eve 1982.

The budget for the film was £250,000 and it was backed by Lew Grade's company ITC Entertainment. It was shot mainly on location at Chelmsford Prison, Essex, which was unoccupied at the time because it was being refurbished after a fire in one of the wings. The escape sequence was filmed in Buckinghamshire and Boxley, Kent. There is also a brief shot of the gates of Maidstone Prison. Sets were constructed for some cell and kitchen scenes.

Most of the filming took place in freezing conditions in January 1979. The resulting delays to the filming schedule meant that the part written for Tony Osoba had to be reduced because he had a commitment to appear in Charles Endell Esquire and his lines were given to other actors.

== Music ==
The opening credits of the film feature the hit "Without You" by Nilsson and "Hit Me with Your Rhythm Stick" by Ian Dury and the Blockheads. The closing credits includes a song by Joe Brown, entitled "Free Inside".

== Release ==
The UK release of the film was accompanied by the documentary of Elton John's 1979 tour of the Soviet Union, To Russia with Elton, also filmed by Clement and La Frenais.

== Reception ==
=== Box office ===
The film was one of the more popular of 1979 at the British box office, grossing £313,747 in the UK.

=== Critical ===
The Monthly Film Bulletin wrote: "Adapted from their own very successful television series by Dick Clement and Ian La Frenais, Porridge falls prey to all the familiar dangers of expansion from the small screen to the large: a half-hour idea stretched fatally to ninety minutes; softening of the characters ...and slow pacing of an over-wordy script with consequently poor timing of the jokes (many of them, rightly or wrongly, carrying a ring of déja entendu) ...The film's few attempts to open out the restricting TV formula are mildly successful, notably the introduction of Grout, played with convincing (and long practised) menace by Peter Vaughan, and the central joke of the all-star show-business football team, which fails to produce Rod Stewart, one of The Goodies, David "Diddy" Hamilton and Michael Parkinson as promised and can only come up with a Welsh scriptwriter and a red-haired weatherman from Anglia."

The Radio Times Guide to Films gave the film 3/5 stars, writing: "The original TV series had ended two years earlier and Ronnie Barker had even been Going Straight [1978] before he was talked back into the role of Norman Fletcher for this movie spin-off. He's excellent and this is one of the best of its kind, thanks to a tightly focused plot from series creators Dick Clement (who also directs) and lan La Frenais. ... Genial, affable fun."

Leslie Halliwell said: "Genial expansion of a successful TV series to the big screen; alas, as usual the material is stretched to snapping point, and the welcome irony of the original becomes sentimentality. Still, the film is a valuable record of memorable characters."

== See also ==
- List of films based on British sitcoms
