= Going Straight =

1978 British TV sitcom

- Going Straight main title
- Created by: Dick Clement; Ian La Frenais
- Written by: Dick Clement; Ian La Frenais
- Directed by: Sydney Lotterby
- Starring: Ronnie Barker; Richard Beckinsale; Patricia Brake; Nicholas Lyndhurst
- Country of origin: United Kingdom
- No. of episodes: 6 (list of episodes)

Production
- Producer: Sydney Lotterby
- Editor: Bill Wright
- Running time: 30 minutes

Original release
- Network: BBC1
- Release: 24 February – 7 April 1978

Related
- Porridge (1974–77); Life Beyond the Box: Norman Stanley Fletcher (2003)

Going Straight is a British television sitcom created and written by Dick Clement and Ian La Frenais, and starring Ronnie Barker and Richard Beckinsale.

The series serves as a direct sequel to the sitcom Porridge, in which all four were involved, with its premise surrounding the exploits of Barker's character Norman Stanley Fletcher following his release from prison on parole and his attempts to not commit another crime for the sake of his family, despite the allure that lawbreaking brings. The programme also featured the appearance of Patricia Brake, reprising her role as Fletcher's daughter Ingrid in Porridge, and Nicholas Lyndhurst as Fletcher's son Raymond. Fulton Mackay, Tony Osoba and Paul McDowell guest starred in the first episode, also reprising their roles from Porridge.

== Cast ==
=== Main cast ===
- Ronnie Barker as Norman Stanley Fletcher
- Richard Beckinsale as Lennie Godber
- Patricia Brake as Ingrid Fletcher
- Nicholas Lyndhurst as Raymond Fletcher

=== Recurring cast ===
- David Swift as Mr McEwan
- Rowena Cooper as Shirley Chapman

=== Guest cast ===
- Fulton Mackay as Principal officer Mr MacKay
- Tony Osoba as Jim McLaren
- Timothy Bateson as Oaksey
- Roberta Tovey as Penny
- Alfred Lynch as Dave Pipers
- Norman Jones as Mr Tanner
- Freddie Earlle as Tony
- Nigel Hawthorne as Worm Wellings
- Pete Postlethwaite (credited as Peter Postlethwaite) as Thomas Clifford Crowther
- Ron Pember as Percy
- Royston Tickner as Sergeant
- Michael Turner as Mr Scotcher
- Dave Hill as Arthur Boyle
- Milton Johns as Mr Kirby
- Robert Raglan as Inspector
- Elizabeth Cassidy as Pamela
- Lally Bowers as Mrs Appleby
- Stephen Tate as Canadian Tourist
- Paul McDowell as Mr Collinson

== Episodes ==
Six episodes of Going Straight, all written by Dick Clement and Ian La Frenais, were produced for the BBC. The series began airing on 24 February and ended on 7 April 1978. All episodes had a running time of approximately 30 minutes.

=== Series 1 (1978) ===
| No. | Title | Directed by | Written by | Original release date | UK viewers (millions) |
|---|---|---|---|---|---|
| 1 | "Going Home" | Sydney Lotterby | Dick Clement and Ian La Frenais | 24 February 1978 | 13.8 |
Norman Stanley Fletcher, having served three of his five years in Slade Prison, finally prepares for freedom when his parole is approved. After vowing that he intends to "go straight", his train journey home sees him meet his old nemesis Mr Mackay, who has retired from the prison service. When an old criminal friend encounters Fletcher, he soon faces a dilemma regarding Mackay's future and his own.
| 2 | "Going to be Alright" | Sydney Lotterby | Dick Clement and Ian La Frenais | 3 March 1978 | TBA |
Fletcher is not happy to discover that his wife has left him, effectively leaving his probation officer in an embarrassing situation to find him a different job to the one he had planned. However, he is determined to ensure his family will survive, by seeking to dig up a buried stash of ill-gotten loot he left in Essex, much to the disappointment of his daughter Ingrid and her boyfriend Lennie Godber - Fletcher's old cellmate.
| 3 | "Going Sour" | Sydney Lotterby | Dick Clement and Ian La Frenais | 10 March 1978 | TBA |
Fletcher continues to face problems as efforts to find him work prove problematic. Whilst wallowing in his thoughts, he comes across a young runaway girl in his local cafe, who has not had it easy due to her bad habits. Fletcher decides to renew his faith in humanity by teaching her to walk on the straight and narrow, but it is not an easy lesson to give.
| 4 | "Going to Work" | Sydney Lotterby | Dick Clement and Ian La Frenais | 17 March 1978 | TBA |
Fletcher finds himself set up with a new job as a night porter at a local hotel, where the manager is friendly to him compared to his receptionist. But the thought of starting his first ever conventional job is not an easy one considering his past, prompting Ingrid and Godber to do whatever they can to ensure he turns up for his first night shift.
| 5 | "Going Going Gone" | Sydney Lotterby | Dick Clement and Ian La Frenais | 24 March 1978 | TBA |
Fletcher is shocked when he recognises a former fellow inmate, Wellings, whilst at work, who claims to be going straight as well. All seems well until Fletcher encounters an elderly wealthy guest and becomes convinced that she and Wellings are planning a con together. Fletcher gives the necklace to Wellings and orders him to leave, but this soon lands Fletcher in hot water when the manager mentions that the elderly lady is a frequent customer, leading him to realise that he has allowed Wellings to steal a valuable necklace, and he quickly finds himself worried that he will not only lose his job but also be sent back to prison.
| 6 | "Going off the Rails" | Sydney Lotterby | Dick Clement and Ian La Frenais | 7 April 1978 | TBA |
Fletcher welcomes Godber's desire to marry Ingrid and agrees to assist them in the preparation. However, a problem arises when an old friend of Fletcher's offers him work with the perfect crime he always dreamt of - a bank raid. But the temptation to go back to crime is soon tested when he finds it is happening on his daughter's wedding day, and only an unexpected moment in the job gives Fletcher a chance to reflect on what he is doing.

== Production ==
A single series of six episodes was made and aired across 1978, attracting an audience of over 15 million viewers and winning a BAFTA TV Award for Best Situation Comedy in March 1979. In addition, the series was featured on the front cover of the 18 February 1978 edition of the Radio Times. Plans for further episodes were allegedly shelved after the premature death of Beckinsale in 1979, although in an interview published in Porridge: The Complete Scripts and Series Guide (2001), the writers stated that only one series was ever planned as Ronnie Barker would only agree to do the six episodes.

The theme tune, sung by Ronnie Barker, detailed Fletch's determination to go straight, an ambition first laid out in the Porridge episode "Men Without Women": This was released as a 7-inch single by EMI Records. The B-side is a track called "The String Bean Queen".
