= Paul McDowell (actor) =

English actor and writer (1931–2016)

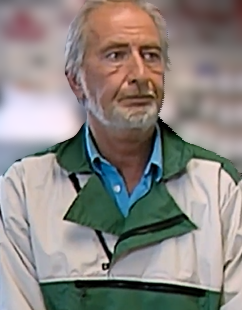
- McDowell in "The Return of Mr. Bean" (1990)
- Born: Paul William McDowell; 15 August 1931; Fulham, London, England
- Died: 2 May 2016 (aged 84); London, England
- Occupation: Actor

Paul William McDowell (15 August 1931 – 2 May 2016) was an English actor and writer who appeared in numerous television productions over a 40-year period.

== Early life and career ==
McDowell was born on 15 August 1931 in Fulham, southwest London, the only son of William, a museum guard and shipyard worker. His mother Frances was a landlady and cleaner. He attended several primary schools and was evacuated to Guildford, Rochdale, and Torbay during World War II. After leaving school, he trained to be a painter at Chelsea Art College. He later attended St Edmund Hall, Oxford.

In the early 1960s as "Whispering" Paul McDowell he was a vocalist with the British 1920s-style jazz band The Temperance Seven, who had a No. 1 hit in Britain. He was a member of the pop group 'Guggenheim' which he formed with Granada Television producer and singer Chris Pye, and guitarist Jules Burns. The album Guggenheim was released in 1972 on Indigo Records, and distributed by the British Decca label. He worked at the Establishment Club as an actor/writer, then became a member of the improvisational group the Second City in the United States and was a writer on The Frost Report.

=== Television actor ===
His television roles include: Mr Collinson, a sour-faced prison officer in Porridge, Churchill's butler in Winston Churchill: The Wilderness Years, and Mr Phillips in The Two of Us.

=== Writer ===
As a screenwriter he wrote for Sheila Hancock and The Two Ronnies. Later he concentrated on writing and teaching tai chi.

== Later life ==
Later he lived in Towcester, Northamptonshire, where he wrote a letter to The Guardian, published on 11 March 2016, less than two months before his death. His letter was an amusing mild rebuke that The Guardian had omitted to state in their obituary of George Martin that his very first Number 1 hit was the Temperance Seven's "You're Driving Me Crazy".

=== Illness and death ===
On 23 April 2016, McDowell announced he had been diagnosed with lung cancer. He died on 2 May 2016, from complications: heart failure following pneumonia. The immediate cause of death on his death certificate was cardiac arrest with respiratory failure. He was survived by his children Helena, Lola, Sidonie, Milo and his third wife, Trisha.

== Filmography ==
=== Film ===
Film
Year	Title	Role	Notes
1959	Food for a Blush	Bit part	Short film Uncredited
1972	Savage Messiah	Agitator	Uncredited
1978	The Life Story of Baal	Piller	
1978	The Thirty Nine Steps	McLean	
1979	Porridge	Collinson	Released in the United States as Doing Time
1980	Rough Cut	Postman	
1985	National Lampoon's European Vacation	English Motorist	
1988	Dead End City	Gang Member	
2008	Chemical Wedding	Symonds	Final film role

=== Television ===
Television
Year	Title	Role	Notes
1966	Festival	Dancer Disco	Writer; Series 7, episode 5: "Westbrook's Man/Ligging About" (Segment: "Ligging About")
1968-1969	Horne A'Plenty	Guest Star	2 episodes
1969	The World of Beachcomber	Trucker	6 episodes
1969	Canada Goose	Conductor	TV movie
1970	Frost on Sunday	Sam	Writer - 9 episodes
1972	His and Hers	Melvyn	Series 2, episode 6: "Telephone"
1972	Scoop	Pigge	3 episodes
1972-1973	But Seriously, It's Sheila Hancock	Vares	2 episodes Writer - 5 episodes
1973	Our Kid	Householder	Episode 6: "The Last of the All-Rounders"
1973	The Protectors	Bank Teller	Series 2, episode 7: "Goodbye George"
1973	Grubstreet	Vance	6 episodes
1974	You'll Never Walk Alone	Third Man	TV movie
1974	No Strings	2nd Workman	Episode 2: "Grow and Let Grow"
1974	Crown Court	Frederick Barker	Season 3, episode 148: "Forgive-Me-Not: Part 1"
1974-1977	Porridge	Mr. Collinson	4 episodes
1975	Churchill's People	1st Guest Star	Episode 12: "A Wilderness of Roses"
1975	The Good Life	Telephone Engineer	Series 1, episode 3: "The Weaker Sex?"
1975	Dawson's Weekly	Dr. Lang	Episode 1: "Les Miserables"
1975	The Nearly Man	Gordon	Episode 5: "Confrontation: July 1975"
1975-1978	Wodehouse Playhouse	Hotel Manager / Studio Guide / First Cop	3 episodes
1976	One-Upmanship	McDowell	3 episodes
1976	Victorian Scandals	Samuel James	Episode 4: "A Pitcher of Snakes"
1976-1979	Dave Allen at Large	Valentin Stone	8 episodes
1977	The Other One	Security Guard	Episode 1
1977-1985	The Two Ronnies	Waiter/Paul/Trucker	3 episodes
1978	Going Straight	Mr. Collinson	Episode 1: "Going Home"
1978	Life at Stake	Pierre Laporte	Episode 8: "James Cross Will Be Executed"
1978	A Soft Touch	Harvey Hornbeam	Episode 1: "Now Take my Wife"
1978	BBC2 Play of the Week	William	Series 2, episode 7: "Return Fare"
1978	Bernie	Ernie Zell	Episode #1.4
1978-1980	Robin's Nest	Doctor	2 episodes
1979	Bloomers	1st Policeman	Episode 3: "The Contract"
1979	Suez 1956	Henry Cabot Lodge	TV movie
1980	Tales of the Unexpected	Schaeffer	Series 2, episode 16: "The Man at the Top"
1980	The Enigma Files	John Smith	Episode 10: "Why Don't They Tell You These Things?"
1980	Play for Today	Bill Newsome	Series 11, episode 1: "Pasmore"
1981	Wolcott	Chief Supt. Cosgrave	3 episodes
1981	Never the Twain	Det. Sgt. Talbot	Series 1, episode 4: "A Matched Pair"
1981	Winston Churchill: The Wilderness Years	Butler at Chartwell	Miniseries; 7 episodes
1981	Angels	Mr. Howard	2 episodes
1981-1984	Kelly Monteith	Ken Keys	2 episodes
1982	Secombe with Music	Conductor #3	Writer - 1 episode
1982	Nancy Astor	Lee	3 episodes
1982	The Brack Report	Eric Fulton	2 episodes - 1 uncredited
1982	Strangers	Detective Inspector O'Rourke	Series 5, episode 1: "A Much Underestimated Man"
1982	Squadron	Air Commodore Grant	Episode 8: "Operation Hawk"
1983	The Kenny Everett Television Show	Earl	Episode #2.3
1983	Blackadder	Herbert, Archbishop of Canterbury	Series 1, episode 3: "The Archbishop"
1983	R.H.I.N.O.; Really Here in Name Only	Barry Clarke	TV series
1983	Potter	The Drunk	Episode #3.6
1983	Chessgame	Jack Soutar	Episode 1: "The Alamut Ambush"
1984-1986	Comrade Dad	Man in Queue	2 episodes
1985	Mixed Doubles	Estate Agent	Series 1, episode 6: "Such Sweet Sorrow"
1985	Terry and June	Newsreader	Series 8, episode 11: "Mistaken Identity"
1986	C.A.T.S. Eyes	Les	Series 2, episode 1: "One Away"
1986	The Fourth Floor	Purvis	Miniseries; 3 episodes
1986	Slinger's Day	Man	Series 1, episode 1: "New Management"
1986	Only Fools and Horses	Man in Market	Series 5, episode 7: "A Royal Flush"
1986	The Alamut Ambush	Jack Soutar	First two episodes of Chessgame edited as a TV movie
1986-1988	All in Good Faith	Supermarket Manager / Policeman	2 episodes
1986-1990	The Two of Us	Colin Phillips	13 episodes
1987-1989	The Little and Large Show	Polo/Matt	2 episodes
1988	Carrott Confidential	Hagen	Episode #2.1
1990	Mr. Bean	The Customer	Episode 2: "The Return of Mr. Bean"
1991	EastEnders	Mr. Wallace	2 episodes
1993	Frank Stubbs Promotes	Featherstone	Series 1, episode 7: "Book"
1994	Law and Disorder	Edward Powell	Episode 3: "A Night to Remember"
1996	The Brittas Empire	Man in Pool	Series 6, episode 6: "Mr. Brittas Falls in Love"
1996	The Legacy of Reginald Perrin	Higgins	Episode 1 Final television appearance
