= Fulton Mackay =

Scottish actor (1922–1987)

Fulton Mackay OBE
- Born: William Fulton Beith Mackay; 12 August 1922; Paisley, Renfrewshire, Scotland
- Died: 6 June 1987 (aged 64); London, England
- Resting place: East Sheen Cemetery, London
- Occupations: Actor, playwright
- Years active: 1952–1987
- Spouse: Sheila Manahan (m. 1961)

William Fulton Beith Mackay (12 August 1922 – 6 June 1987) was a Scottish actor and playwright, best known for his role as prison officer Mr Mackay in the 1970s television sitcom Porridge.

== Early life ==
Mackay was born in Paisley, Renfrewshire, Scotland. He was brought up in Clydebank by a widowed aunt after the death of his mother from diabetes. His father was employed by the NAAFI.

On leaving school, Mackay trained as a quantity surveyor and later volunteered for the Royal Air Force in 1941, but was not accepted because of a perforated eardrum. He then enlisted with the Black Watch and he served for five years during the Second World War, which included three years spent in India.

== Career ==
=== Theatre work ===
After being demobbed, Mackay began training as an actor at RADA. His first work was with the Citizens' Theatre, Glasgow, where he performed in nine seasons between 1949 and 1958. He also worked at the Royal Lyceum Theatre, Edinburgh before gaining notice at the Arts Theatre Club, London, where in 1960, he played the part of Oscar in The Naked Island, a play about POWs in Singapore.

In 1962, Mackay appeared at the same theatre, in Russian playwright Maxim Gorki's play The Lower Depths for the Royal Shakespeare Company. He then acted with the Old Vic company and the National Theatre, performing in such productions as Peer Gynt and The Alchemist. Other roles for the RSC included Mr Squeers in Nicholas Nickleby and the drunken gaoler in Die Fledermaus. In 1972, he played the part of Hughie in the Royal Lyceum Theatre Company's production of Bill Bryden's play, Willie Rough.

Mackay was a director of the Scottish Actors' Company and, in 1981, a founder of the Scottish Theatre Company, playing Willie Souden in the company's production of Bill Bryden's play, Civilians, set in wartime Greenock.

=== Television work ===
Mackay was acknowledged as a strong character actor in various television series. He is best remembered for his namesake role from 1973 to 1977 as the comically ferocious prison officer, Mr Mackay, in the British sitcom Porridge, alongside Ronnie Barker. He also appeared in the film version of the series. The ensemble playing of Mackay, Barker, Richard Beckinsale and Brian Wilde, and the writing by Dick Clement and Ian La Frenais, made Porridge one of the most successful comedy series of the 1970s. He returned to the role of Mr Mackay, now nearing retirement from HM Prison Service, in the first episode of Going Straight (1978), the sequel series to Porridge.

Before coming to prominence in Porridge, Mackay made several appearances in The Avengers, one particular episode being Return of the Cybernauts in which he played Professor Chadwick; he also played Det. Supt., later Det. Chief Supt. Inman in Special Branch (1969–71). His other work included Coronation Street and Z-Cars. He appeared as RAF psychiatrist Fowler in an episode of Some Mothers Do 'Ave 'Em and as a doctor in Doctor at Large in 1971.

Mackay played John Everett in The Saint (1968) "The Best Laid Schemes" and Willie, a poacher in The Saint (1966) - Episode (S5, E6) "The Convenient Monster". He was cast as misguided scientist Doctor John Quinn in the 1970 Doctor Who story Doctor Who and the Silurians and was later seriously considered by producer Barry Letts to play the Fourth Doctor when Jon Pertwee announced he was leaving the role in 1974.

Mackay played a regular officer running a training course in the Dad's Army episode "We Know Our Onions" (1973), a doctor in "The Miser's Hoard" (1977), and a detective in a Wodehouse Playhouse episode (1978).

Mackay often stayed true to his Scottish roots, acting in productions such as Play for Today's Three Tales of Orkney, in 1971, and The Master of Ballantrae, and as former Prime Minister Bonar Law in the 1981 TV series The Life and Times of David Lloyd George. He played the Captain in the British version of the Jim Henson children's series, Fraggle Rock (1984–1987). In one of his last performances, Mackay portrayed an art forger in the Lovejoy episode "Death and Venice".

=== Film work ===
Despite his status, he appeared in few films. After his screen debut in the film I'm a Stranger (1952), his most notable roles were those in Gumshoe (1971), Porridge (1979), Britannia Hospital (1982), Local Hero (1983), and Defence of the Realm (1985). He also appeared in Laxdale Hall 1952.

=== Playwriting ===
Under the pseudonym of Aeneas MacBride, Mackay wrote plays for the BBC. His Dalhousie's Luck, a drama set at the time of the siege of Aberdeen by the Marquess of Montrose in 1644, produced by Pharic Maclaren and with Brian Cox in the title role, was broadcast as part of the BBC2 Playhouse series on 3rd August 1980.

== Personal life and death ==
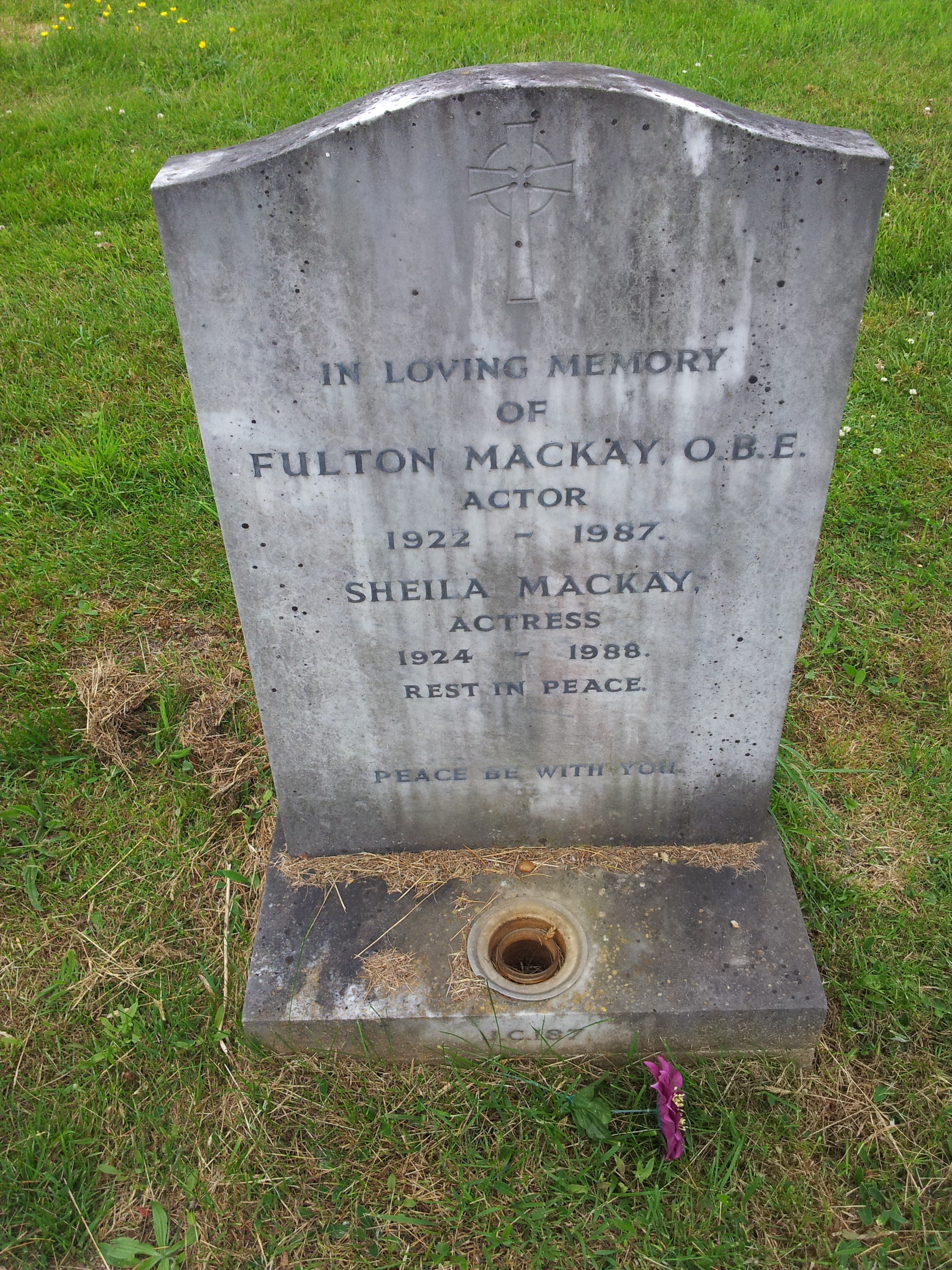
Mackay and his wife Sheila's grave in East Sheen Cemetery, Richmond upon Thames, London

Mackay was married to Irish actress Sheila Manahan. "They were an incredible welcoming, inclusive couple", recalled actor Brian Cox in 2022. "They were like my real family, my surrogate parents in many ways."

In 1984, Mackay was awarded an OBE. He greatly enjoyed oil painting.

Mackay died from stomach cancer on 6 June 1987, at the age of 64. He was buried at East Sheen Cemetery in southwest London. His widow, Sheila, died in 1988 and was buried with her husband.

== Theatre ==
Year	Title	Role	Company	Director	Notes
1948	Ane Satyre of the Thrie Estaites	King Humanitie	The Glasgow Citizens' Theatre	Tyrone Guthrie, Moultrie Kelsall	play by Sir David Lyndsay, adapted by Robert Kemp
1972	Willie Rough	Hughie	Lyceum Theatre, Edinburgh	Bill Bryden	play by Bill Bryden
1981	Civilians	Willie Souden	Scottish Theatre Company	Bill Bryden	play by Bill Bryden

== Partial filmography ==
=== Film ===
Film	Year	Character
I'm a Stranger	1952	Alastair Campbell
The Brave Don't Cry	1952	Dan Wishart
Laxdale Hall	1953	Andrew Flett
Private Potter	1962	Soldier
A Prize of Arms	1962	Corporal Henderson
Mystery Submarine	1963	McKerrow
Vendetta for the Saint	1969	Euston
Gumshoe	1971	John Straker
Nothing But The Night	1973	Cameron
Porridge	1979	Mr Mackay
If You Go Down in the Woods Today	1981	Colonel Norris
Going Gently	1981	Austin Miller
Britannia Hospital	1982	Chief Superintendent Johns
Local Hero	1983	Ben Knox
Night Train to Murder	1984	Mackay
Sleepwalker	1984	Restaurant Proprietor
Water	1985	Reverend Eric
Defence of the Realm	1985	Victor Kingsbrook
Dreamchild	1985	Gryphon (voice)

== TV ==
Play	Year(s)	Character	Note
Dr. Finlay's Casebook	1963-1969	Various	6 episodes
Z-Cars	1964-1972	Various	5 episodes
The Saint	1966-1969	Various	3 episodes
The Avengers	1967-1969	Various	3 episodes
Frontier	1968	Captain Moncrieff	2 episodes
Special Branch	1969-1970	Det. Chief. Supt. Inman	18 episodes
Doctor Who	1970	Dr. John Quinn	Serial: "Doctor Who and The Silurians"
Paul Temple	1971	Lindfors	Episode: "Sea Burial"
Doctor at Large	1971	Dr. McKendrick	Episode: "Congratulations - It's a Toad"
Play for Today	1971-1976	Various	4 episodes
Seven of One	1973	Mr. Mackay	Episode: "Prisoner and Escort"
Some Mothers Do 'Ave 'Em	1973	Fowler	Episode: "The RAF Reunion"
Dad's Army	1973-1977	Dr. McCeavedy/Captain Ramsey	2 episodes
Porridge	1974-1977	Mr. Mackay	19 episodes
Churchill's People	1975	Bishop Wishart	Episode: "The Wallace"
The Vital Spark	1974	Mr McCubbin - Minister	Episode: "The Wedding"
Crown Court	1975-1982	Various	9 episodes
Going Straight	1978	Mr. Mackay	Episode: "Going Home"
Tales of the Unexpected	1982	Edward	Episode: "The Moles"
Shelley	1983	The Tramp	Episode: "Of Cabbages and Kings"
Fraggle Rock	1983-1984	The Captain	
Mann's Best Friends	1985	Hamish James Ordway	
Lovejoy	1986	Luciano	Episode: "Death and Venice: Part Two"
Slip-Up	1986	McColl	TV film
