= Brian Wilde =

British actor (1927–2008)

- Wilde as Foggy Dewhurst, c. 1990
- Born: Brian George Wilde; 13 June 1927; Ashton-under-Lyne, Lancashire, England
- Died: 20 March 2008 (aged 80); Ware, Hertfordshire, England
- Resting place: Harwood Park Crematorium, Stevenage, Hertfordshire, England
- Occupation: Actor
- Years active: 1953–1997
- Spouse: Eva Stuart (m. 1960)
- Children: 2

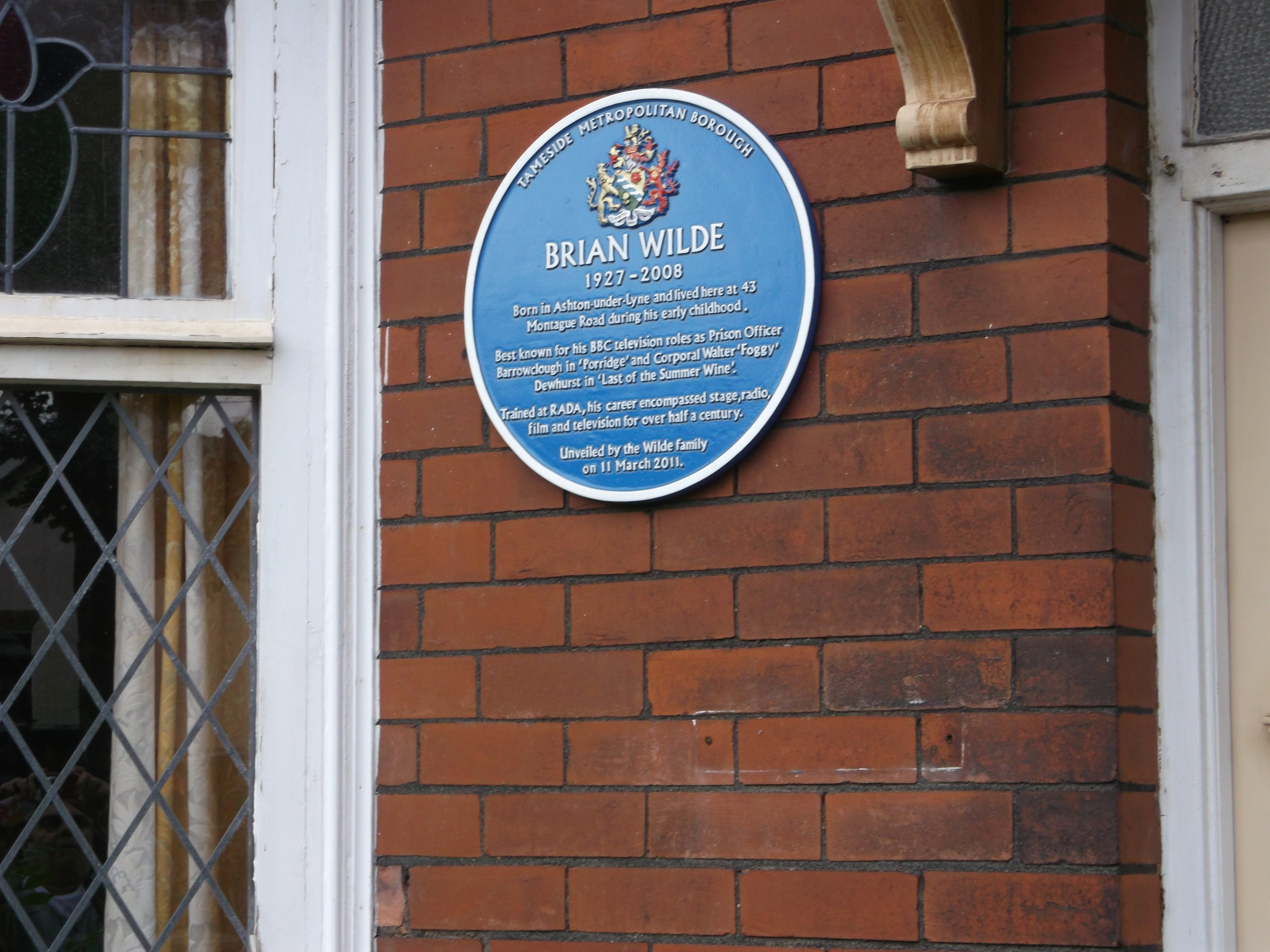
Brian Wilde blue plaque in Ashton-under-Lyne

Brian George Wilde (13 June 1927 – 20 March 2008) was an English actor best known for his roles in television comedy, most notably Mr Barrowclough in Porridge (1974-1977) and Walter "Foggy" Dewhurst in Last of the Summer Wine (1976-1997). Although tall, his gentle demeanour became his hallmark. His lugubrious world-weary face was a staple of British television for forty years.

== Early life ==
Born 13 June 1927 in Ashton-under-Lyne, Lancashire, Wilde was brought up in Devon and Hertfordshire and attended Hertford Grammar School. He trained as an actor at RADA, graduating in 1947 with an Acting (RADA Diploma).

== Career ==
Wilde had an early uncredited role as a small-time crook in the film Forbidden Cargo (1954), co-starring with Jack Warner and Nigel Patrick, and in the horror film Night of the Demon (1957). His early television work included the series The Love of Mike (1960), and supporting Tony Hancock in episodes of his ATV series in 1963. Wilde also played Detective Superintendent Halcro in a series of two-part thrillers about undercover Scotland Yard officers, The Men from Room Thirteen (BBC, 1959–61). He had minor roles in films such as Life for Ruth (1962), The Bargee (1964), The Jokers (1967) and Carry On Doctor (1967).

Wilde's first major television success was in 1970 as refuse depot manager "Bloody Delilah" in the ITV sitcom The Dustbinmen (1970). He showed his sinister side as the mischievous magician Mr Peacock in the children's drama series Ace of Wands between 1970 and 1972. That year he starred as a murderer in The Uninvited, an episode of the BBC's supernatural thriller series Out of the Unknown. Also in 1971, in the television drama Elizabeth R, Wilde played the efficient, merciless 'rackmaster' Richard Topcliffe, who was charged with the torture of prisoners in the Tower of London. He played a character in the 1970s Richard Carpenter's British children's series The Ghosts of Motley Hall.

=== Porridge ===
In 1973, Wilde starred as a different kind of gaoler in the second episode of Seven of One, a series of seven individual stories, all of which starred Ronnie Barker. In the episode, entitled "Prisoner and Escort", Wilde played Mr Barrowclough, one of two prison officers whose job it is to escort Barker's character Fletcher across the moors to his prison (the other was Mr Mackay, played by Fulton Mackay). The episode proved successful and a series was commissioned by the BBC, titled Porridge. Wilde reprised his role as the timid and eager-to-please Barrowclough. Porridge which ran until 1977, was a great success, with a film version being made in 1979.

=== Last of the Summer Wine ===
Wilde gained and established another role in 1976, when he took over from Michael Bates as the third member of a trio of old men in the BBC sitcom Last of the Summer Wine. The character, Walter "Foggy" Dewhurst, was a determined ex-army man who planned the group's misadventures with military precision and a painstaking eye for detail. Wilde saw the long-running series gather momentum and continue its success; he stayed with the series for nine years, before leaving in 1985 to work on other projects. Foggy was written out of the series and was replaced by Michael Aldridge as Seymour Utterthwaite.

When Aldridge left Last of the Summer Wine, Wilde returned as Foggy in 1990. He stayed until 1997, when he contracted shingles during the preparations for series 19 and decided to retire. Frank Thornton was invited to join the cast to replace Wilde, making his debut in the 1997 Christmas special "There Goes The Groom!".

=== Other work ===
Wilde featured in "The Fear Merchants", an episode of ABC's The Avengers, in January 1967. In this he played Jeremy Raven, a ceramics manufacturer caught up in a sinister plot to get rid of the competition. In 1978, Wilde voiced the public information film series Play Safe, highlighting the dangers of overhead power lines to children.

Wilde also supplied the voice of the magician Meredith in the children's animated series Alias the Jester, Shortie the Giraffe in adverts for Coco Pops and narrated an animated series, Microscopic Milton, about a tiny man who lives in a clock on the mantelpiece in the parlour of the house that belongs to a lady called Mrs. Witherspoon. Wilde starred in his own BBC series in 1988, Wyatt's Watchdogs, as retired soldier Major Wyatt who forms his own neighbourhood watch group. As a stuffy ex-army member who leads a motley bunch of comic characters, Wyatt was quite similar to Foggy. The programme, which co-starred Trevor Bannister, was written by Miles Tredinnick and ran for one series of six episodes.

=== Death ===
Wilde suffered a fall in January 2008 from which he never recovered. He died in his sleep, aged 80, on the morning of 20 March 2008, at his home in Ware, Hertfordshire.

Wilde's son, Andrew Wilde, had been film editor on Last of the Summer Wine from the mid-1990s until the final episode in 2010, working initially on many of the episodes that had starred his father and later on the Frank Thornton episodes.

== Partial filmography ==
=== Film ===
- Street Corner (1953) – Pinky – Bogus Detective Sgt (uncredited)
- Will Any Gentleman...? (1953) – 1st Clerk
- Forbidden Cargo (1954) – Smuggler at Airfield (uncredited)
- Simon and Laura (1955) – Peter Harbottle
- Now and Forever (1956) – Policeman (uncredited)
- Tiger in the Smoke (1956) – Trumps
- Interpol (1957) – The Monk
- Night of the Demon (1957) – Rand Hobart
- The Gypsy and the Gentleman (1958) – (uncredited)
- Girls at Sea (1958) – Bill
- Corridors of Blood (1958) – Man in Operating Theatre Audience (uncredited)
- Subway in the Sky (1959)
- Beyond the Curtain (1960) – Bill Seddon
- Scotland Yard (film series) (1961) - The Never Never Murder - Porter
- Life for Ruth (1962) – Newspaper Photographer (uncredited)
- We Joined the Navy (1962) – Petty Officer Gibbons
- On the Run – Chief Warder
- West 11 (1963) – Speaker
- The Informers (1963) – Lipson
- The Man Who Finally Died (1963) – Cemetery Superintendent (uncredited)
- The Bargee (1964) – Policeman
- Rattle of a Simple Man (1964) – Fred
- Darling (1965) – Willett
- Morgan: A Suitable Case for Treatment (1966) – Mr. Gilbert (uncredited)
- Rasputin the Mad Monk (1966) – Vassily's Father (uncredited)
- The Jokers (1967) – Sgt. Catchpole
- You Only Live Twice (1967) – 1st Policeman (uncredited)
- Carry On Doctor (1967) – Man from Cox & Carter
- Connecting Rooms (1970) – Ellerman
- Goodbye Gemini (1970) – Taxi Driver
- Carry On Henry (1971) – Warder (scenes deleted)
- One Brief Summer (1971) – Lambert
- No Sex Please, We're British (1973) – Policeman
- Alfie Darling (1975) – Doctor
- To the Devil a Daughter (1976) – Black Room Attendant
- Adventures of a Taxi Driver (1976) – Harold
- Play Safe (1978) – Owl (voice)
- Porridge (1979) – Barrowclough

=== Television ===
| Year | Title | Role | Notes |
|---|---|---|---|
| 1960 | The World of Tim Frazer | Tupper | 4 episodes |
| 1963 | Hancock | Stan Lovegrove | 1 episode |
| 1964 | Melissa | Chief Inspector Carter | 6 episodes |
| 1965–1966 | The Man in Room 17 | George Horton / Dr. Boddington | 2 episodes |
| 1966 | The Baron | Paul Sutton | Episode: "Portrait of Louisa" |
| 1966–1967 | Room at the Bottom | Mr Salisbury | 7 episodes |
| 1967 | The Avengers | Jeremy Raven | Episode: "The Fear Merchants" |
| 1967 | George and the Dragon | Policeman | 1 Episode |
| 1970 | The Dustbinmen | Bloody Delilah | 14 episodes |
| 1970 | Catweazle | Vicar | Episode: The Telling Bone’’ |
| 1970–1973 | Special Branch | Professor Munro / Alan Pritchard | 2 episodes |
| 1971 | Elizabeth R | Richard Topcliffe | Episode: "Horrible Conspiracies" |
| 1971 | Justice | David Latimer/Jeavons | To Help an Old School Friend |
| 1972 | Ace of Wands | Mr Peacock | 3 episodes |
| 1973 | Black & Blue | Major Forster | Episode: "Secrets" |
| 1973 | Marked Personal | Stan Lyons | 2 episodes |
| 1973 | Crown Court (TV series) | Mr. Appleby | Case 50 (Sept 1973): Episode "Public Lives" |
| 1974–1977 | Porridge | Mr. Henry Barrowclough | 19 episodes |
| 1975 | The Sweeney | Stanley Hedges | Episode: "Thin Ice" |
| 1976–1985, 1990–1997 | Last of the Summer Wine | Walter "Foggy" Dewhurst | 116 episodes |
| 1984 | The Kit Curran Radio Show | Roland Simpson | 6 episodes |
| 1988 | Wyatt's Watchdogs | Major John Wyatt | 6 episodes |

=== Radio ===
- Thirty Minute Theatre (BBC) - The New Catacomb 1958
- Say Something Happened (1989)
