= Norman Stanley Fletcher =

Lead character in the British sitcom Porridge

- Porridge/Going Straight character
- Ronnie Barker as Fletcher.
- Portrayed by: Ronnie Barker; Shaun Williamson
- Duration: 1973–1978, 2003
- First appearance: "Prisoner and Escort" (1973)
- Last appearance: Life Beyond the Box: Norman Stanley Fletcher (2003)
- Created by: Dick Clement and Ian La Frenais
- Spin-off appearances: Going Straight (1978); Life Beyond the Box (2003)
In-universe information
- Occupation: Career criminal Pub landlord
- Brothers: Harry Fletcher; George Fletcher; Rodney Fletcher
- Wife: Isobel Fletcher (divorced); Gloria Fletcher
- Sons: Raymond Fletcher
- Daughters: Ingrid Godber; Marion Fletcher
- Grandsons: Norman Godber; Nigel Fletcher
- Uncles: Godfrey; Wilfred

Norman Stanley Fletcher, commonly nicknamed "Fletch", is the main fictional character in the BBC sitcom Porridge, and the spin-off, Going Straight. He was played by Ronnie Barker.

In the pilot episode, Fletcher claims to Mr. Barrowclough that he was sentenced for stealing a truck, which then crashed through garden walls and a toolshed when its brakes failed. This turns out to be a shaggy dog story leading up to the punchline "I asked for six other fences to be taken into consideration". In other episodes, it is stated that he was sentenced for breaking and entering and that he is a career burglar. The opening of each episode refers to Fletcher as an "habitual criminal."

His tactics range from the practical (stealing pills from the prison doctor and eggs from the prison farmyard), to the symbolic (finding new and imaginative ways to stick two fingers up at Mackay, the antagonist prison officer, and get away with it). In return, Mackay's frenzied, neurotic attempts to catch Fletcher out, when fruitful, give the warder a level of smugness and satisfaction that is only accentuated by his charge's hostility and skulking.

Fletch is also surprised when this spell in prison finds him taking on the role of father figure. It is left to him to help Warren when he needs a letter read or written and to oversee new, younger inmates such as McClaren and Godber.

Fletch is manipulative and can play upon the sympathies and weaknesses of people like the liberal warden, Mr. Barrowclough, and the ineffectual prison governor to acquire more pleasant employment, accommodation, or special privileges.

Fletcher was born, in his words, "two-two-thirty-two" - on 2 February 1932. He is a native of Muswell Hill. His elder daughter Ingrid was conceived in Highgate Cemetery, shortly before his marriage to Isobel at the age of 19. He also has a younger daughter Marion and a son named Raymond. Fletcher did his post-war National Service in the early 1950s, including service in the Malayan Emergency. He joined the Royal Army Service Corps or RASC, which he refers to in army slang as "Run Away, Someone's Coming". He was "King of the Teds" in Muswell Hill, circa 1955, and retains fond memories of Gloria, a seamstress with whom he had an affair at that time, and who used to tighten his trousers for him.

Upon release from prison, Fletch decided to give up his criminal career. In the follow-up series, Going Straight, he took a job as a hotel night-porter but found himself often tempted back into crime, although he resisted. His wife, Isobel, had left him, leaving him in sole charge of Raymond.

When last seen, in the 2003 mockumentary Life Beyond the Box: Norman Stanley Fletcher, Fletch was the landlord of a pub in Muswell Hill, alongside his second wife, Gloria (the old flame briefly mentioned in Porridge).

In 2009, the character was revived in a stage production, penned by Dick Clement and Ian La Frenais, and is played by Shaun Williamson.

In the 2016 revival of the show, also titled Porridge, it is revealed that Fletcher died circa 2011.

== Personality and traits ==
For a man of his age and poor education, Fletch is highly intelligent. He speaks with confidence and a large vocabulary on a wide range of topics including politics, race relations, the justice system, and society in general. It appears he possesses a considerable degree of natural intellect. He is a tolerant man who briefly dabbled in Marxist politics in his youth but is often cynical about the world and generally pessimistic. His attitude never goes beyond simple complaining and playful teasing of Mr. Mackay, although Fletch occasionally shows a darker side which reflects his true mental state, usually when he is talking about his past. The large amount of time he has spent in prison has left him feeling that he has wasted his life. In the final episode of Going Straight, he is persuaded not to return to crime after walking into a pet shop and seeing the animals in cages, reminding him of his time in prison. He struggles to adapt to life on the outside after his spell in Slade prison, and his frayed nerves have resulted in a quick temper, shown by how quick he is to shout at his daughter Ingrid. He is also something of a drinker - on one occasion, after sneaking away from an outdoor trip, he goes straight to a pub and drinks several pints of beer, one of which he downs in one. In Going Straight, he consumes several pints of beer and a few whisky chasers just on the train from Carlisle to London. He mentions that an "average day" in Muswell Hill involved visiting four different pubs for a "swift half". He is upset that his wife Isobel has left him and struggles to cope with the responsibility of holding his family together. On finally gaining legitimate employment in a hotel as a night porter, Fletcher reveals to Godber that it is his first ever "proper job" and he had managed to avoid legitimate work entirely after leaving school until he was released from Slade prison aged 45.

Fletch is a Tottenham Hotspur supporter; in Porridge S1E6, Fletch tells an inmate that he spent a weekend on compassionate leave "in the pub," "eating roast beef," and "watching Spurs win at home." In Going Straight S1E1 he collects his personal possessions upon his release from the prison which includes a Tottenham Hotspur key chain. The Fletch character may have a second team, though, since in the film version of Porridge he says he has supported Leyton Orient for 20 years, and in Going Straight S1E3 he plans to attend a match between Orient and Mansfield Town, hoping that Orient "might just scrape a point."
