= Sydney Lotterby =

British television director (1926–2020)

Sydney Lotterby OBE
- Born: Sydney Warren Lotterby; 30 November 1926; London, England
- Died: 28 July 2020 (aged 93); London, England
- Occupation(s): Television producer, television director
- Years active: 1948–2005
- Notable work: Last of the Summer Wine; Open All Hours; Porridge; The Liver Birds
- Spouse: Marcia Dos Santos (m. 1997)

Sydney Warren Lotterby (30 November 1926 – 28 July 2020) was a British television producer and director who produced numerous BBC comedy series.

== Life and career ==
Lotterby was born in Paddington, London, to Winifred (née Warren) and Sidney Lotterby, a shop fitter, and grew up in Edgware, Middlesex. In 1941, on leaving Stag Lane school aged 14, he joined the BBC as a storekeeper in the electrical department at Broadcasting House, then worked in the sound control room at BBC Radio until his national service in the British Army from 1946 until 1948. After national service he returned to the BBC and became a cameraman and progressed to becoming technical manager. He joined the BBC's Entertainment Department in 1958 and in 1963, became a producer/director.

Lotterby married Marcia Dos Santos in 1997. He died at his home in Chiswick on 28 July 2020, at the age of 93.

== Production and direction ==
Television comedy series which he produced or directed included: As Time Goes By, May to December, Last of the Summer Wine, Yes, Minister and Yes, Prime Minister, Ever Decreasing Circles, Brush Strokes, Open All Hours, The Old Boy Network, Butterflies, Ripping Yarns, Porridge, Going Straight, Broaden Your Mind, the final series of Some Mothers Do 'Ave 'Em, The Liver Birds, Up Pompeii! and Sykes and A....

A sketch in At Last The 1948 Show in which four exactly alike men all called Sydney Lotterby ("The Four Sydney Lotterbies") was written by John Cleese, because he liked the name. The men were played by Cleese, Marty Feldman, Tim Brooke-Taylor, and Graham Chapman. Cleese also gave the name to the character played by Robert Lindsay in Fierce Creatures (1997).

== Awards ==
Lotterby won four BAFTA awards for comedy, including for Porridge (and also for a special in 1975), Going Straight (1978) and Yes Minister (1980). He was also nominated for 11 more. In 1994, Lotterby was appointed OBE.

== Filmography ==
Year	Title	Credit		Notes
Year	Title	Producer	Director	Notes
1960	Charlie Drake		2 episodes	Series 4
1961	Does the Team Think?		1 episode	Series 1
1961	What's My Line?		2 episodes	Series 11
1962	Steptoe and Son			Production assistant (unknown episodes)
1962	Twist!	4 episodes	6 episodes	Series 1
1962–64	Sykes and a...	15 episodes	19 episodes	Series 5–7
1962	A Christmas Night with the Stars			Segment director; TV special
1963–74	Comedy Playhouse	4 episodes	1 episode	Series 3, 8, 10 & 14
1964	The Graham Stark Show	7 episodes		Series 1
1965	The Likely Lads			Associate producer; Series 1 (2 episodes)
1966	On the Margin		6 episodes	Series 1
1967–68	Dee Time	6 episodes	28 episodes	Series 1–3
1967	Three of a Kind	5 episodes		Series 2
1968	BBC Show of the Week	1 episode		
1968	Kindly Leave the Stage	7 episodes		Series 1
1968–69	Broaden Your Mind	13 episodes		Series 1
1969–75	The Liver Birds	45 episodes	22 episodes	Pilot & Series 1–5 (uncredited director)
1969	The Gnomes of Dulwich	5 episodes		Series 1
1969	Harry Worth	2 episodes		Series 4
1970	Up Pompeii!	6 episodes		Series 2
1971	Me Mammy	7 episodes		Series 3
1971	Now Take My Wife	7 episodes		Series 1
1972	Grubstreet		1 episode	Pilot
1972	A Christmas Night with the Stars	1 episode		TV special: segment: "The Liver Birds"
1973	The World of Cilla	1 episode		TV special
1973-78	Some Mothers Do 'Ave 'Em	7 episodes	9 episodes	Series 1 & 3 (uncredited director)
1973	7 of 1	4 episodes	3 episodes	Series 1
1974–77	Porridge	20 episodes	20 episodes	Series 1–3 (uncredited director)
1974	The Last Turkey in the Shop Show			TV movie short
1976–85	Open All Hours	25 episodes	25 episodes	Series 1–4
1976–83	Last of the Summer Wine	31 episodes	26 episodes	Series 3–7
1978	Going Straight	6 episodes	6 episodes	Series 1 (uncredited director)
1979	Ripping Yarns			Executive producer; Series 2 (2 episodes)
1980	Yes Minister	6 episodes	6 episodes	Series 1 (uncredited director)
1980–83	Butterflies	14 episodes	6 episodes	Series 3 & 4
1981	Coming Home	6 episodes		Series 1
1981–83	The Last Song	13 episodes	13 episodes	Series 1 & 2
1984	The Magnificent Evans	6 episodes	6 episodes	Series 1
1984	Ever Decreasing Circles	13 episodes	13 episodes	Series 1 & 2
1986–88	Yes, Prime Minister	16 episodes	16 episodes	Series 1 & 2
1986	Brush Strokes	13 episodes		Series 1
1987–89	Foreign Bodies	18 episodes	17 episodes	Series 1–3
1988	A Gentleman's Club	6 episodes	6 episodes	Series 1
1989–90	May to December	13 episodes	13 episodes	Series 1 & 2
1990	One Foot in the Grave			Studio director; Series 2 (1 episode)
1991	Tonight at 8.30		1 episode	Series 1
1992–2005	As Time Goes By	67 episodes	67 episodes	Series 1–9 & specials
1992	The Old Boy Network	7 episodes	7 episodes	Series 1
1997	Bloomin' Marvellous	8 episodes	—	Series 1
1999	Comedy Greats: Ronnie Barker			Video
2000	Butterflies Reunion Special			TV short
