= Ian La Frenais =

English writer

Ian La Frenais OBE
- Born: 7 January 1937 (age 89); Monkseaton, Northumberland, England
- Education: Dame Allan's Boys School, Newcastle upon Tyne
- Occupation: Screenwriter
- Spouse: Doris Vartan (m. 1984)
- Relatives: Gladys and Cyril La Frenais (parents)
- Writing career
- Period: 1964–present
- Genre: Television

Ian La Frenais (born 7 January 1937) is an English writer best known for his creative partnership with Dick Clement. They are most famous for television series including The Likely Lads, Whatever Happened to the Likely Lads?, Porridge and its sequel Going Straight, Lovejoy and Auf Wiedersehen, Pet.

== Early life ==
La Frenais was born in Monkseaton, Northumberland; his father was an accountant. As a child at Park Primary School in Whitley Bay, La Frenais enjoyed art and writing. He then attended Dame Allan's Boys School in Newcastle upon Tyne, and completed his National Service in the British Army. After working as a salesman for a tobacco company, he began composing songs for a weekly satirical programme on Tyne Tees Television and then moved to London where he worked for a market research company.

== Writing partnership with Dick Clement ==
Ian La Frenais and Dick Clement have enjoyed a long and successful career embracing films, television and theatre. Their partnership began in the mid-1960s with the hit television show The Likely Lads, and by the end of the decade they had also written three feature films: The Jokers, Otley (directed by Clement) and Hannibal Brooks.

In the early 1970s, they worked on two other features: Villain, starring Richard Burton, and Catch Me a Spy (again directed by Clement), starring Kirk Douglas. In this same period, they created their award-winning TV series Whatever Happened to the Likely Lads?; this was followed by Porridge, Thick as Thieves and Going Straight. There were big-screen versions of both The Likely Lads and Porridge, and a 'rockumentary', To Russia With Elton, in 1979.

Earlier that decade they had adapted Keith Waterhouse's Billy Liar into the stage musical Billy, starring Michael Crawford, which ran at London's Drury Lane Theatre for two-and-a-half years.

By the late 1970s, they were living in California, where they wrote On the Rocks, an American version of Porridge, and The Prisoner of Zenda, a feature film starring Peter Sellers.

In the 1980s, their work included most of the TV series Auf Wiedersehen, Pet, which was voted ITV's Favourite TV Programme of all Time in a Radio Times readers' poll to celebrate the network's 60th anniversary, and uncredited writing work on the James Bond film Never Say Never Again. La Frenais produced the films Bullshot (1983) and Water (1985), both directed by Clement; they also substantially wrote the latter. In 1987, they wrote and produced Vice Versa.

In the US, he and Clement were writers and supervising producers on HBO's Emmy-winning show Tracey Takes On... for four years in the 1990s. Their films around this time include The Commitments, which won both the Evening Standard's Peter Sellers Award for Comedy and a BAFTA Award for Best Adapted Screenplay, Excess Baggage and Still Crazy. In addition, they did uncredited rewrites on The Rock (starring Sean Connery) for Jerry Bruckheimer and director Michael Bay.

More recent television includes Archangel (starring Daniel Craig) and The Rotters' Club, which they adapted from best-sellers by Robert Harris and Jonathan Coe respectively. Their most recent film credits include Goal! The Dream Begins, the animated film Flushed Away, Across the Universe and The Bank Job.

Two new television series written by them were broadcast in 2017: an updated version of Porridge, starring Kevin Bishop, for the BBC, and the Rose D'Or award-winning Henry IX for UKTV Gold, starring Charles Edwards. They have written the books for two stage musicals in development, Juke Box Hero and Victoria's Secret.

They have also featured in documentaries - Porridge: Inside Out on Gold TV in 2014, Comedy Classics: Porridge on Channel 5 in 2022 and Joe Wilkinson & David Earl's Magical Sitcom Tour in 2026

In 2019 he and Clement published their autobiography: More Than Likely: A Memoir (published by Weidenfeld & Nicolson) and La Frenais is currently writing a novel.

=== Other credits ===
In addition to his long-running collaborations with Clement, La Frenais has created, co-created, written and/or contributed to many other TV series, including The Two Ronnies, several episodes of the BBC's Comedy Playhouse, The Other 'Arf (1980–81), the long-running series Lovejoy and the hit 1990s BBC detective series Spender (co-written with actor and singer Jimmy Nail).

Like Clement, La Frenais was made an OBE in the Queen's 2007 Birthday Honours list.

== Personal life ==
Since 1984, Ian La Frenais has been married to artist Doris Vartan, the mother of actor Michael Vartan.

La Frenais supports the football club Newcastle United. He is a patron of the Whitley Bay Film Festival.

== Writing credits (with Dick Clement) ==
- The Likely Lads (TV, 1964–66)
- Not Only... But Also (TV, 1965)
- The Further Adventures of Lucky Jim (TV, 1967)
- Mr. Aitch (TV, 1967)
- Vacant Lot (TV, 1967)
- Otley (1968)
- Hannibal Brooks (1968)
- Villain (1971)
- To Catch a Spy (1972)
- The Two Ronnies (TV, 1972)
- Seven of One (TV, 1973) - Episodes "Prisoner and Escort" and "I'll Fly You for a Quid"
- Ha-Tarnegol (1973, with Haim Hefer)
- Whatever Happened to the Likely Lads? (TV, 1973–74)
- Thick as Thieves (TV, 1974)
- Porridge (TV, 1974–77)
- On the Rocks (TV, 1975–76)
- Going Straight (TV, 1978)
- The Prisoner of Zenda (1979)
- Porridge (1979, US: Doing Time)
- The New Adventures of Lucky Jim (TV, 1982)
- Never Say Never Again (1983, with Lorenzo Semple Jr., uncredited)
- Auf Wiedersehen, Pet (TV, 1983–2004)
- Sunset Limousine (TV, 1983, with Wayne Kline)
- Water (1985, with Bill Persky)
- Lovejoy (TV, 1986–94)
- Vice Versa (1988)
- The Commitments (1991, with Roddy Doyle)
- Tracey Ullman: A Class Act (TV, 1992)
- The Old Boy Network (TV, 1992)
- Tracey Ullman Takes on New York (TV, 1993)
- Full Stretch (TV, 1993)
- Tracey Takes On... (TV, 1996–99)
- Excess Baggage (1997, with Max D. Adams)
- Still Crazy (1998)
- Archangel (TV, 2005)
- The Rotters' Club (TV, 2005)
- Goal! (2005, with Mike Jefferies and Adrian Butchart, US: Goal! The Dream Begins)
- Flushed Away (2006, Sam Fell, Peter Lord, Christopher Lloyd, Joe Keenan and William Davies)
- Across the Universe (2007, with Julie Taymor)
- The Bank Job (2008)
- Killing Bono (2011, with Ben Bond)
- Spies of Warsaw (TV, 2013)
- Porridge (TV, 2016–2017)
- Henry IX (TV, 2017)
- My Generation (2017)
