= Dick Clement =

English film director and writer (born 1937)

Dick Clement OBE
- Born: 5 September 1937 (age 88) Westcliff-on-Sea, Essex, England
- Occupation: Screenwriter, director, producer
- Period: 1964–2017
- Genre: Television
- Spouse: Nancy Campbell Clement (1982–present)

Dick Clement (born 5 September 1937) is an English writer, director and producer. He became known for his writing partnership with Ian La Frenais for television series including The Likely Lads, Whatever Happened to the Likely Lads?, Porridge, Lovejoy and Auf Wiedersehen, Pet.

== Early life ==
Born in Westcliff-on-Sea, Essex, England, Clement was educated at Bishop's Stortford College, and then spent a year in the US on an exchange visit. Upon his return, he completed his National Service with the Royal Air Force.

He then joined the BBC as a studio manager and started writing scripts and comedy sketches.

== Writing partnership with Ian La Frenais ==
Dick Clement and Ian La Frenais have enjoyed a long and successful career embracing films, television and theatre. Their partnership began in the mid-1960s with The Likely Lads, and by the end of the decade they had also written three feature films: The Jokers, Otley, (directed by Clement) and Hannibal Brooks. Clement also directed the BBC sketch show Not Only... But Also, which starred Peter Cook and Dudley Moore, and, for the big screen, Iris Murdoch's A Severed Head.

In the early 1970s, two other features were scripted by Clement and La Frenais: Villain, starring Richard Burton, and Catch Me a Spy, starring Kirk Douglas. In this same period, they created their award-winning series Whatever Happened to the Likely Lads?, followed by Porridge, Thick as Thieves and a spin-off from Porridge, Going Straight. There were big screen versions of both The Likely Lads and Porridge, the latter directed by Clement, and a 'rockumentary', To Russia With Elton, in 1979.

During the same period, they adapted Keith Waterhouse's Billy Liar into the stage musical Billy, starring Michael Crawford, which ran at London's Drury Lane Theatre for two and a half years. By this time they were living in California, where they wrote the American version of Porridge, On the Rocks, and the feature film, The Prisoner of Zenda, starring Peter Sellers.

In the 1980s, Clement directed John Wells's hit stage play Anyone For Denis? He directed the films Bullshot and Water, which were produced by his writing partner La Frenais. The pair also scripted the latter film, and contributed extensive, uncredited writing work on the unofficial James Bond movie Never Say Never Again. In 1987, they wrote and produced Vice Versa. Their television work at the time included the ITV series Auf Wiedersehen, Pet, voted ITV's Favourite TV Programme of all Time in a Radio Times readers' poll to celebrate the 60th anniversary of the station.

By the beginning of the 1990s, La Frenais had created the long-running series, Lovejoy, and co-created Spender with Jimmy Nail. In America, they were writers and supervising producers for HBO's Emmy-winning show, Tracey Takes On..., for four years. They scripted the film adaptation of The Commitments, which won the Evening Standard's Peter Sellers Award for Comedy and the BAFTA Award for Best Adapted Screenplay, and also wrote the screenplays for Excess Baggage and Still Crazy. In addition, they did uncredited rewrites on The Rock, starring Sean Connery, and Pearl Harbor for producers Jerry Bruckheimer and Michael Bay (who also directed the film). They had also been commissioned to write a draft of Super Mario Bros. for directors Rocky Morton and Annabel Jankel. This would ultimately lead the film into pre-production after several failed drafts but it was heavily rewritten by Ed Solomon once Walt Disney Studios acquired distribution rights.

In 2005, Clement and La Frenais had two television adaptations of best-selling novels broadcast by the BBC: Jonathan Coe's The Rotter's Club for BBC Two, and Robert Harris's Archangel, starring Daniel Craig, for BBC One. That year also saw the UK release of Goal!, a film they co-scripted. In 2006, they were credited as writers on the animated film Flushed Away, while 2007 saw the release of the jukebox musical Across the Universe, based around the songs of The Beatles, which they scripted, and, with director Julie Taymor, wrote the story for. The 2008 film The Bank Job, starring Jason Statham, is their last screenplay work to date.

Two new television series written by them aired in 2017: a new version of Porridge, starring Kevin Bishop, for the BBC, and Henry IX for UKTV Gold, starring Charles Edwards. The duo have also written the book for two stage musicals in development, Juke Box Hero and Victoria's Secret.

They have also featured in documentaries - Porridge: Inside Out on Gold TV in 2014, Comedy Classics: Porridge on Channel 5 in 2022 and Joe Wilkinson & David Earl's Magical Sitcom Tour in 2026.

Clement and La Frenais were both awarded OBEs in the 2007 Queen's Birthday Honours list.

== Personal life ==
Clement supports the football club Chelsea F.C.

== Writing credits (with Ian La Frenais) ==
- The Likely Lads (TV, 1964–66)
- Not Only... But Also (TV, 1965)
- Further Adventures of Lucky Jim (TV, 1967)
- Mr. Aitch (TV, 1967)
- Vacant Lot (TV, 1967)
- Otley (1968)
- Hannibal Brooks (1968)
- Villain (1971)
- To Catch a Spy (1972)
- The Two Ronnies (TV, 1972)
- Seven of One (TV, 1973) - Episodes "Prisoner and Escort" and "I'll Fly You for a Quid"
- Ha-Tarnegol (with Haim Hefer) (1973)
- Thick as Thieves (TV, 1974)
- Whatever Happened to the Likely Lads? (TV, 1973–74)
- Porridge (TV, 1974–77)
- On the Rocks (TV, 1975–76)
- Going Straight (TV, 1978)
- The Prisoner of Zenda (1979)
- Porridge (film) (US: Doing Time, 1979)
- The New Adventures of Lucky Jim (TV, 1982)
- Never Say Never Again (with Lorenzo Semple Jr., 1983, uncredited)
- Auf Wiedersehen, Pet (TV, 1983–2004)
- Sunset Limousine (with Wayne Kline, TV, 1983)
- Water (with Bill Persky, 1985)
- Vice Versa (1988)
- The Commitments (with Roddy Doyle, 1991)
- Tracey Ullman: A Class Act (TV, 1992)
- The Old Boy Network (TV, 1992)
- Tracey Ullman Takes on New York (TV, 1993)
- Full Stretch (TV, 1993)
- Lovejoy (TV, 1991–94)
- Excess Baggage (with Max D. Adams, 1997)
- Still Crazy (1998)
- Tracey Takes On... (TV, 1996–99)
- Archangel (2005)
- The Rotters' Club (TV, 2005)
- Goal! The Dream Begins (2005)
- Flushed Away (with Sam Fell, Peter Lord, Christopher Lloyd, Joe Keenan and William Davies, 2006)
- Across the Universe (with Julie Taymor, 2007)
- The Bank Job (2008)
- Killing Bono (with Sam Maxwell and Ben Bond, 2011)
- Spies of Warsaw (2013)
- Porridge (TV, 2016-2017)
- Henry IX (TV, 2017)
- My Generation (2017)
