= Fart (disambiguation) =

Fart most often refers to:

- Flatulence, the act of expelling intestinal gas through the anus
- Fart (word), a colloquial term for flatulence

Fart or FART may also refer to:

== Entertainment ==
- "Think U the Shit (Fart)", a 2024 song by Ice Spice
- DogFart, an American interracial pornography company
- Fart King, initial name for a 1995 Chinese romantic comedy film, later released as Trouble Maker
- Fathers Against Rude Television (F.A.R.T.), from "Bender Should Not Be Allowed on TV", an episode of the Futurama sitcom

== Science ==
- Fuzzy adaptive resonance theory, of cognition
- False alarm rate testing, in statistics, Type I and type II error testing

== Sports clubs ==
- FL Fart (Norwegian: "Speed"), Norwegian football club
- Fart Kielce (now Effector Kielce), a Polish volleyball club

== Other uses ==
- Fatal accident reconstruction team, who conduct traffic collision reconstruction
- Regional Bus and Rail Company of Ticino (Italian: Ferrovie Autolinee Regionali Ticinesi), Switzerland

== See also ==
- Fard, a religious duty in Islam
- Vaginal flatulence, or 'vart'
