= Fart (word) =

English profanity

Fart is a word in the English language most commonly used in reference to flatulence that can be used as a noun or a verb. The immediate roots are in the Middle English words ferten, feortan and farten, kin of the Old High German word ferzan. Cognates are found in Old Norse, Slavic and also Greek and Sanskrit. The word fart has been incorporated into the colloquial and technical speech of a number of occupations, including computing. It is often considered unsuitable in formal situations, as it may be considered vulgar or offensive.

== Etymology ==
The English word fart is one of the oldest words in the English lexicon. Its Indo-European origins are confirmed by the many cognate words in some other Indo-European languages: It is cognate with Greek verb πέρδομαι (perdomai), as well as the Latin pēdĕre, Sanskrit pardate, Ashkun pidiṅ, Avestan pərəδaiti, Italian fare un peto, French péter, Russian пердеть (perdet') and Polish pierdzieć << PIE *perd~ [break wind loudly] or *pezd- [the same, softly], all of which mean the same thing. Like most Indo-European roots in the Germanic languages, it was altered under Grimm's law, so that Indo-European /p/ > /f/, and /d/ > /t/, as the German cognate furzen also manifests.

== Vulgarity and offensiveness ==
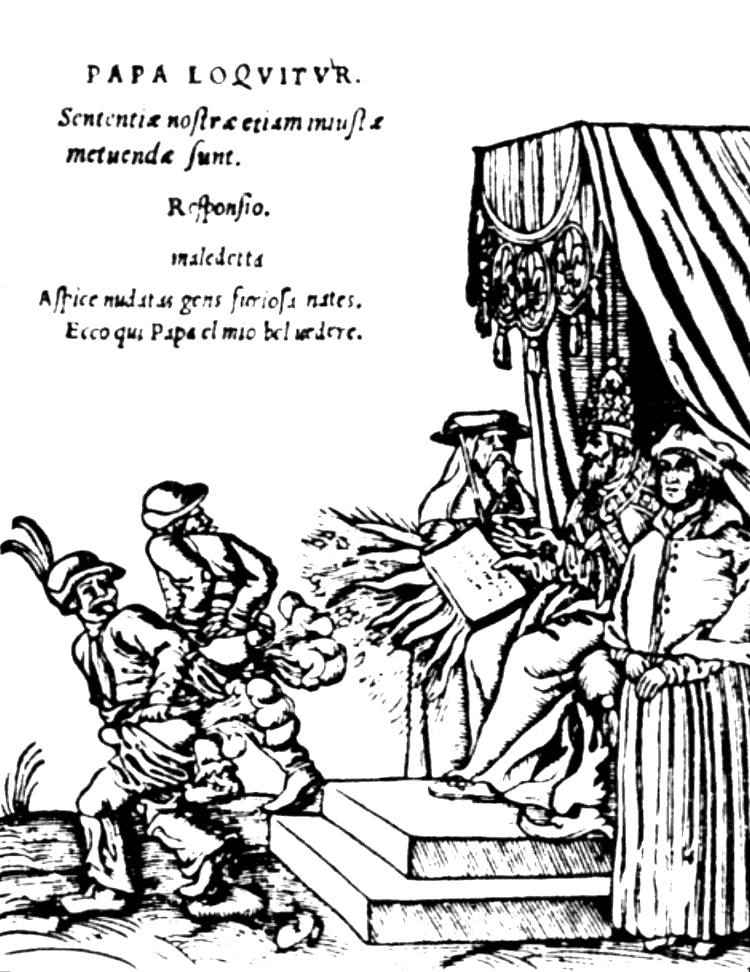
From a series of woodcuts (1545) usually referred to as the Papstspotbilder or Papstspottbilder in German or Depictions of the Papacy in English, by Lucas Cranach, commissioned by Martin Luther. Title: Kissing the Pope's Feet. German peasants respond to a papal bull of Pope Paul III. Caption reads: "Don't frighten us Pope, with your ban, and don't be such a furious man. Otherwise we shall turn around and show you our rears."

In certain circles the word is considered merely a common profanity with an often humorous connotation. For example, a person may be referred to as a 'fart', or an 'old fart', not necessarily depending on the person's age. This may convey the sense that a person is boring or unduly fussy and be intended as an insult, mainly when used in the second or third person. For example, "he's a boring old fart!" However, the word may be used as a colloquial term of endearment or in an attempt at humorous self-deprecation (e.g., in such phrases as "I know I'm just an old fart" or "you do like to fart about!"). 'Fart' is often only used as a term of endearment when the subject is personally well known to the user.

In both cases though, it tends to refer to personal habits or traits that the user considers to be a negative feature of the subject, even when it is a self-reference. For example, when concerned that a person is being overly methodical they might say 'I know I'm being an old fart', potentially to forestall negative thoughts and opinions in others. When used in an attempt to be offensive, the word is still considered vulgar, but it remains a mild example of such an insult. This usage dates back to the Medieval period, where the phrase 'not worth a fart' would be applied to an item held to be worthless.

=== Historical examples ===
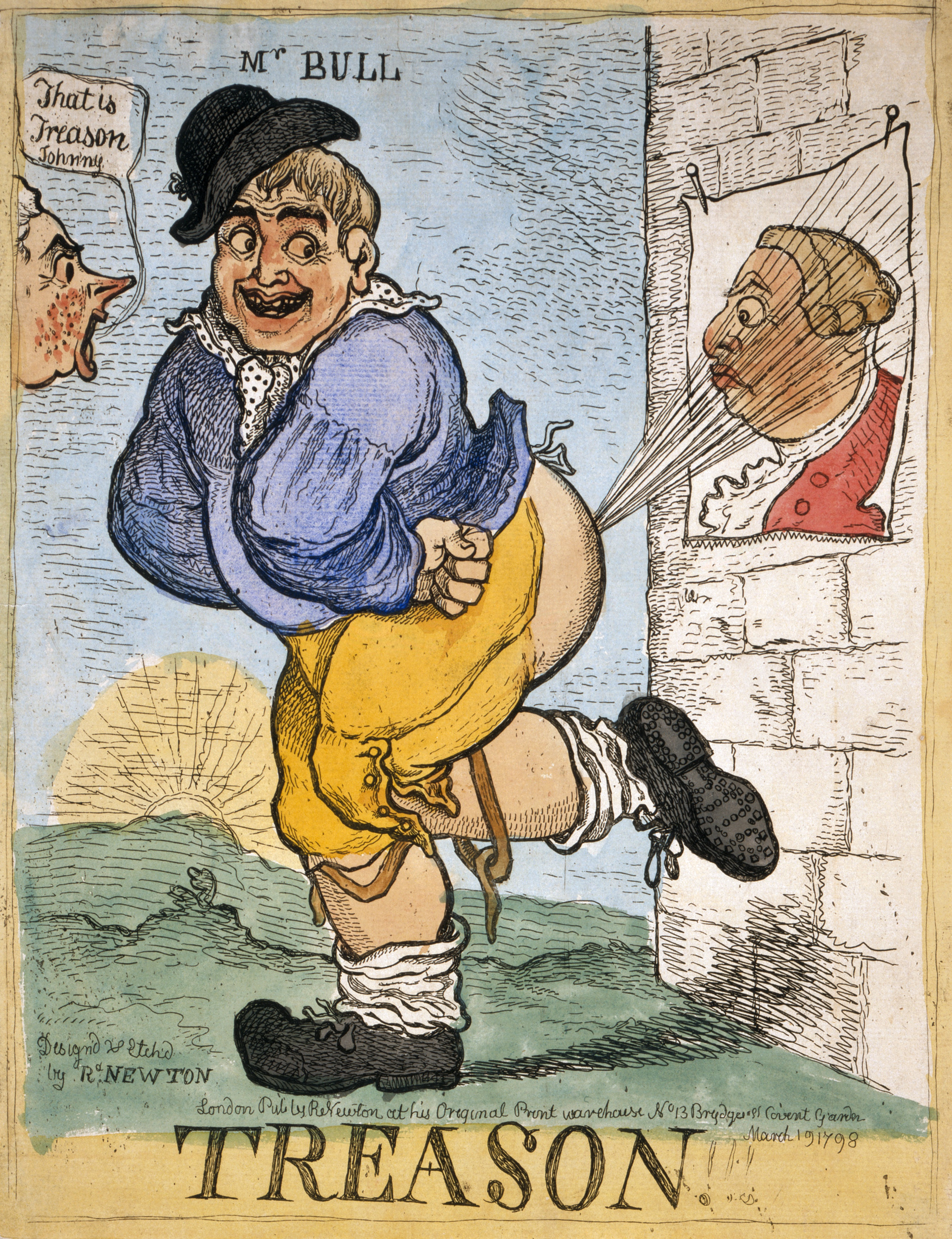
John Bull emits an explosive bout of flatulence at a poster of George III as an outraged William Pitt the Younger admonishes him. Newton's etching was probably a comment on Pitt's threat (realized the following month) to suspend habeas corpus.

The word fart in Middle English occurs in "Sumer Is Icumen In", where one sign of summer is "bucke uerteþ" (the buck farts). It appears in several of Geoffrey Chaucer's Canterbury Tales. In "The Miller's Tale", Absolon has already been tricked into kissing Alison's buttocks when he is expecting to kiss her face. Her boyfriend Nicholas hangs his buttocks out of a window, hoping to trick Absolon into kissing his buttocks in turn and then farts in the face of his rival. In "The Summoner's Tale", the friars in the story are to receive the smell of a fart through a twelve-spoked wheel.

In the early modern period, the word fart was not considered especially vulgar; it even surfaced in literary works. For example, Samuel Johnson's A Dictionary of the English Language, published in 1755, included the word. Johnson defined it with two poems, one by Jonathan Swift, the other by Sir John Suckling.

Benjamin Franklin prepared an essay on the topic for the Royal Academy of Brussels in 1781 urging scientific study. In 1607, a group of Members of Parliament had written a ribald poem entitled The Parliament Fart, as a symbolic protest against the conservatism of the House of Lords and the king, James I.

=== Modern usage ===
While not one of George Carlin's original seven dirty words, he noted in a later routine that the word fart ought to be added to "the list" of words that were not acceptable (for broadcast) in any context (which have non-offensive meanings), and described television as (then) a "fart-free zone". Thomas Wolfe had the phrase "a fizzing and sulphuric fart" cut out of his 1929 work Look Homeward, Angel by his publisher. Ernest Hemingway, who had the same publisher, accepted the principle that "fart" could be cut, on the grounds that words should not be used purely to shock. The hippie movement in the 1970s saw a new definition develop, with the use of "fart" as a personal noun, to describe a "detestable person, or someone of small stature or limited mental capacity", gaining wider and more open usage as a result.

Rhyming slang developed the alternative form "raspberry tart", later shortened to "raspberry", and occasionally abbreviated further to "razz". This was associated with the phrase "blowing a raspberry". The word has become more prevalent, and now features in children's literature, such as the Walter the Farting Dog series of children's books, Robert Munsch's Good Families Don't and The Gas We Pass by Shinta Cho.

== See also ==
- Flatulence humor
- Le Pétomane
- Queef
