= Hundeprutterutchebane =

Steel roller-coaster in Zealand, Denmark

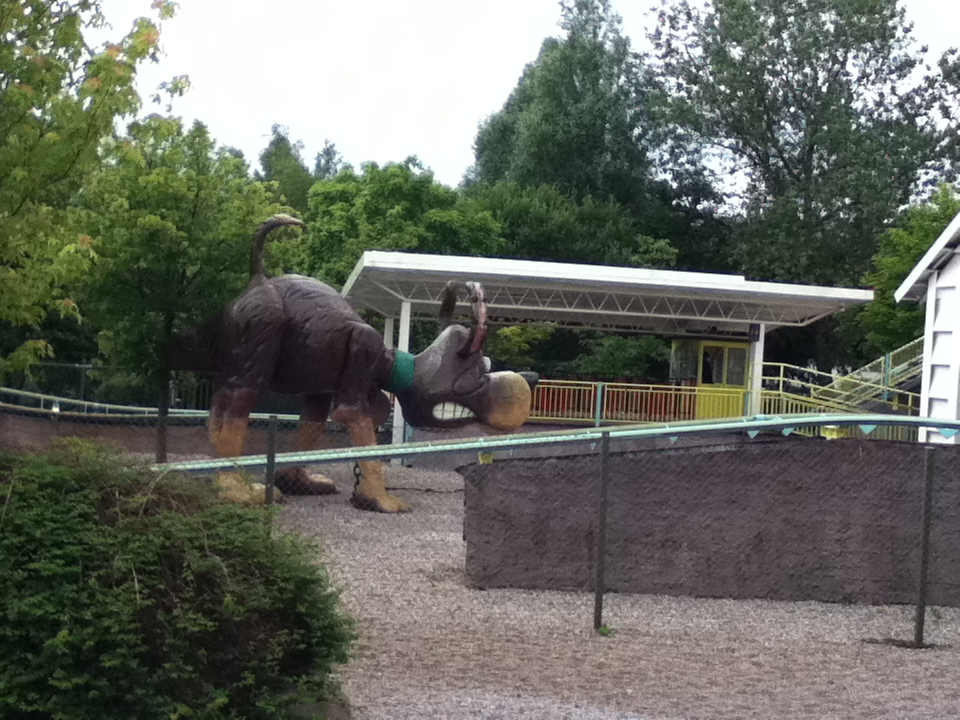

BonBon-Land
- Location: BonBon-Land
- Coordinates: 55.2599°N 11.8639°E
- Status: Operating
- Opening date: 1993; 33 years ago

General statistics
- Type: Steel – Family
- Manufacturer: Zierer
- Model: Force - One
- Height: 4.5 m (15 ft)
- Length: 128 m (420 ft)
- Speed: 30 km/h (19 mph)
- Inversions: 0
- Capacity: 650 riders per hour
- Hundeprutterutchebane at RCDB

Hundeprutterutchebane (lit. 'Dog-Fart Roller Coaster') is a steel roller coaster at BonBon-Land, in southern Zealand. The rollercoaster is known for its dog-flatulence-related theme.

== History and theme ==
Hundeprutterutchebane was the first coaster to open at BonBon-Land in 1993. BonBon-Land was opened in 1992 by the confectionery company BonBon that makes sweets based on toilet humour. Hundeprutter ("Dog Farts") was one of the most popular flavors and consequently became the theme for the first coaster at the park. Built by Zierer, the coaster layout is a relatively simple family coaster, and it is the park's smallest roller coaster. The coaster trains are designed in the shape of a dachshund named "Henry", Riders go past a statue of Henry defecating, through a kennel, and past bones and piles of feces. There are also speakers throughout the ride which make farting sounds, as well as barks.

The attraction demonstrates BonBon-Land's humorous approach to making amusement rides. Its unconventional theming makes is stand out and help attract attention from enthusiasts.

== Reviews and press attention ==
Hundeprutterutchebane's unusual name and theme have attracted considerable attention. The coaster has been listed among the Travel Channel's "15 Wacky Rollercoasters" and is included in the mental floss article "8 Theme Park Rides I Wouldn't Wait in Line For." The coaster has also been described by a number of other sources, including USA Today, Cracked, and The Chive.

Robb Alvey with the Travel Channel described Hundeprutterutchebane as having the most pure wackiness of any roller coaster, and Willy Volk with Gadling said that the coaster "gives new meaning to the phrase 'the wind in my face.'"

== See also ==
- Flatulence humour
