= Beans, Beans, the Musical Fruit =

Playground saying and children's song

"Beans, Beans, The Musical Fruit" (alternatively "Beans, Beans, good for your heart") is a playground saying and children's song about how beans cause flatulence (farting).

The basis of the song (and flatulence humor in general) is the high amount of oligosaccharide present in beans. Bacteria in the large intestine digest these sugars, producing carbon dioxide, hydrogen, and methane.

== Lyrics ==
Beans, beans, the musical fruit.
The more you eat, the more you toot.
The more you toot, the better you feel.
So eat your beans with every meal!

Alternate lyrics include:

Beans, beans, the magical fruit.
The more you eat, the more you toot.
The more you toot, the better you feel.
So let’s have beans for every meal!

Another alternate version includes:

Beans, beans, they’re good for your heart.
The more you eat, the more you fart.
The more you fart, the better it feels.
Beans should be served at every meal!

A variant documented by Iona Opie, an English folklorist, is:

Beans, beans, make you fart.
Beans, beans, are good for your heart.
Apple crumble makes you rumble;
Custard powder makes it louder.

== Popular culture ==
- A version of the rhyme appears at the beginning of Robert Crumb's comic strip, "Crybaby's Blues".
- In The Simpsons season 4 episode 20 "Whacking Day," Bart performs a rendition of "Beans, Beans, the Musical Fruit" in a Christian school.
- The American bean brand Bush Brothers and Company wrote a related song with the singer Josh Groban. The lyrics include a direct reference to the rhyme: "They'd yell about the musical fruit // They'd say the more that I ate, the more I'd (toot)".
- In a "Dot's Poetry Corner" segment of Animaniacs, Dot recites a variation entitled "Ode to a Veggie", that goes "Beans, beans, the musical fruit / The more you eat, the more they kick you off the air if you finish this poem."

== General references ==
- Dawson, Jim. Who Cut the Cheese?: A Cultural History of the Fart, ISBN 1-58008-011-1
