= Ribaldry =

Off-color humor

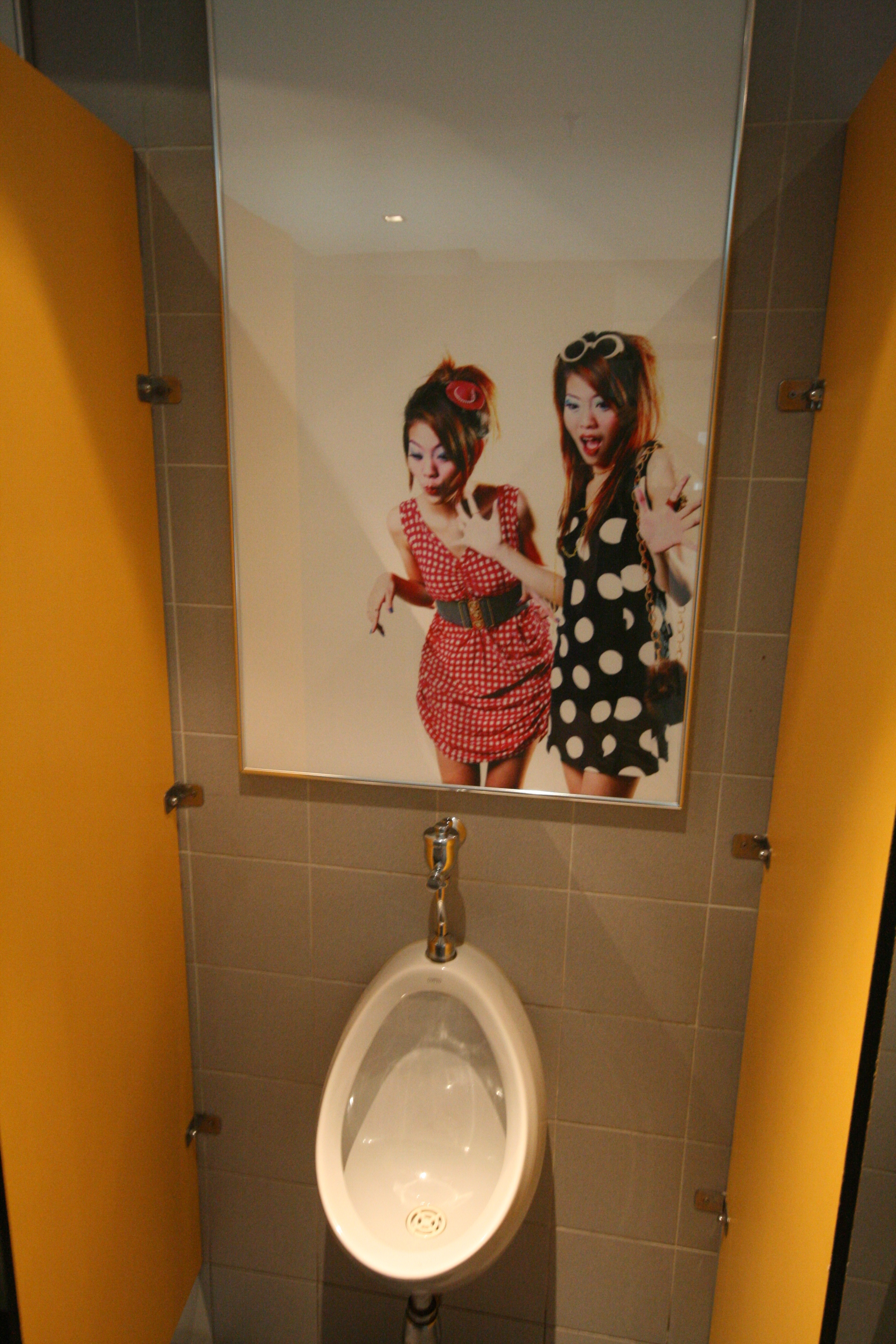
A urinal in Thailand with a ribald depiction

Ribaldry, also known as blue comedy in performing arts, is a humorous genre of entertainment that ranges from bordering on indelicacy to indecency, with the humorous elements based on amusingly coarse and morally incorrect or irreverent talk and behavior. Blue comedy is also referred to as "bawdiness" or being "bawdy". Like any humour, ribaldry may be read as conventional or subversive. Ribaldry typically depends on a shared background of sexual conventions and values, and its comedy generally depends on seeing those conventions broken.

The ritual taboo-breaking that is a usual counterpart of ribaldry underlies its controversial nature and explains why ribaldry is sometimes a subject of censorship. Ribaldry, whose usual aim is not "merely" to be sexually stimulating, often does address larger concerns than mere sexual appetite. However, being presented in the form of comedy, these larger concerns may be overlooked by censors.

Sex is presented in ribald material more for the purpose of poking fun at the foibles and weaknesses that manifest themselves in human sexuality, rather than to present sexual stimulation either overtly or artistically. Also, ribaldry may use sex as a metaphor to illustrate some non-sexual concern, in which case ribaldry borders satire.

Ribaldry differs from black comedy in that the latter deals with topics that would normally be considered painful or frightening, whereas ribaldry deals with topics that would only be considered offensive.

== Examples ==
A sexual joke about attraction, based on sexual stereotypes

Ribaldry is present to some degree in every culture and has likely been around for all of human history. Works like Lysistrata by Aristophanes, Menaechmi by Plautus, Cena Trimalchionis by Petronius, and The Golden Ass of Apuleius are ribald classics from ancient Greece and Rome. Geoffrey Chaucer's "The Miller's Tale" from his Canterbury Tales and The Crabfish, one of the oldest English traditional ballads, are classic examples. The Frenchman François Rabelais showed himself to be a master of ribaldry (technically called grotesque body) in his Gargantua and other works. The Life and Opinions of Tristram Shandy, Gentleman by Laurence Sterne and The Lady's Dressing Room by Jonathan Swift are also in this genre; as is Mark Twain's long-suppressed 1601.

Another example of ribaldry is "De Brevitate Vitae", a song which in many European-influenced universities is both a student beer-drinking song and an anthem sung by official university choirs at public graduation ceremonies. The private and public versions of the song contain vastly different words. More recent works like Candy, Barbarella, The Sensuous Nurse, the comedic works of Russ Meyer, Little Annie Fanny and John Barth's The Sot-Weed Factor are probably better classified as ribaldry than as either pornography or erotica.

== Bawdy song ==
A bawdy song is a humorous song that emphasises sexual themes and is often rich with innuendo. Historically these songs tend to be confined to groups of young males, either as students or in an environment where alcoholic beverages are freely available. An early collection was Wit and Mirth, or Pills to Purge Melancholy, edited by Thomas D'Urfey and published between 1698 and 1720. Selected songs from Wit and Mirth have been recorded by the City Waites and other singers. Sailor's songs tend to be quite frank about the exploitative nature of the relationship between men and women. There are many examples of folk songs in which a man encounters a woman in the countryside. This is followed by a short conversation, and then sexual intercourse, e.g. "The Game of All Fours". Neither side demonstrates any shame or regret. If the woman becomes pregnant, the man will not be there anyway. Rugby songs are often bawdy. Examples of bawdy folk songs are: "Seventeen Come Sunday" and "The Ballad of Eskimo Nell". Robert Burns compiled The Merry Muses of Caledonia (the title is not Burns's), a collection of bawdy lyrics that were popular in the music halls of Scotland as late as the 20th century. In modern times Hash House Harriers have taken on the role of tradition-bearers for this kind of song. The Unexpurgated Folk Songs of Men (Arhoolie 4006) is a gramophone record containing a collection of American bawdy songs recorded in 1959.

== Blue comedy ==
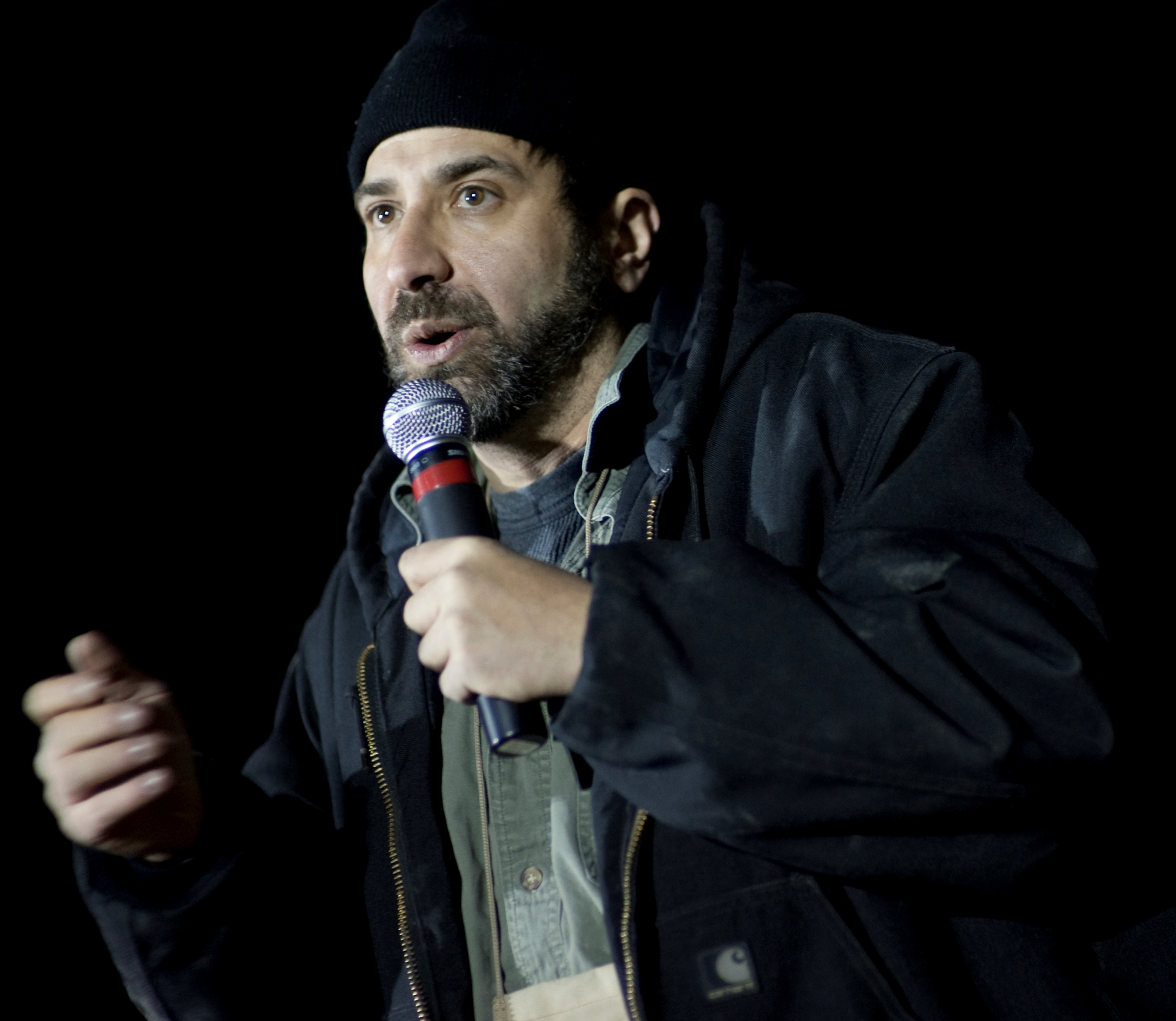
Dave Attell has been described as a blue comedian by his peers.

Blue comedy is comedy that is off-colour, risqué, indecent, or profane, largely about sex. It often contains profanity or sexual imagery that may shock and offend some audience members.

"Working blue" refers to the act of using swear words and discussing things that people would not discuss in "polite society". A "blue comedian" or "blue comic" is a comedian who usually performs risqué routines layered with curse words.

There is a common misconception that comedian Max Miller (1894–1963) coined the phrase, after his stage act which involved telling jokes from either a white book or a blue book, chosen by audience preference (the blue book contained ribald jokes). However, the Oxford English Dictionary contains earlier references to the use of blue to mean ribald: 1890 Sporting Times 25 Jan. 1/1 "Shifter wondered whether the damsel knew any novel blue stories." and 1900 Bulletin (Sydney) 20 Oct. 12/4 "Let someone propose to celebrate Chaucer by publicly reading some of his bluest productions unexpurgated. The reader would probably be locked up."

Private events at show business clubs such as the Masquers often showed this blue side of otherwise clean-cut comedians; a recording survives of one Masquers roast from the 1950s with Jack Benny, George Jessel, George Burns, and Art Linkletter all using highly risqué material and obscenities. Many comedians who are normally family-friendly might choose to work blue when off-camera or in an adult-oriented environment; Bob Saget exemplified this dichotomy. Bill Cosby's 1969 record album 8:15 12:15 records both his family-friendly evening standup comedy show, and his blue midnight show, which included a joke about impregnating his wife "right through the old midnight trampoline" (her diaphragm) and other sexual references.

Some comedians build their careers on blue comedy. Among the best known of these are Redd Foxx, Lawanda Page, and the team of Leroy and Skillet, all of whom later performed on the family-friendly television show Sanford and Son. Page, Leroy, and Skillet specialised in a particular African American form of blue spoken word recitation called signifying or toasting. Dave Attell has also been described by his peers as one of the greatest modern-day blue comics.

On talk radio in the United States and elsewhere, blue comedy is a staple of the shock jock's repertoire. The use of blue comedy over American radio airwaves is severely restricted due to decency regulations; the Federal Communications Commission can levy fines against radio stations that air obscene content.

== Blue literature ==
As a part of English literature, blue literature dates back to at least Middle English, while bawdy humor is a central element in works of such writers as Shakespeare and Chaucer. Examples of blue literature are also present in various cultures, among different social classes, and genders. Until the 1940s, writers of English-language blue literature were almost exclusively men; since then, it has become possible for women to build a commercial career on blue literature. While no extensive cross-cultural study has been made in an attempt to prove the universality of blue literature, oral tradition around the world suggests that this may be the case.

== See also ==
- Black comedy
- Clean comedy
- Dirty blues
- Drinking song
- Grotesque body
- Limerick (verse)
- Off-color humor
- Ruth Wallis
- Sex comedy
- Shock humour
- "The Ball of Kirriemuir"
- Toilet humor
