= Imsil Cheese Theme Park =

Theme park in Imsil-gun, South Korea

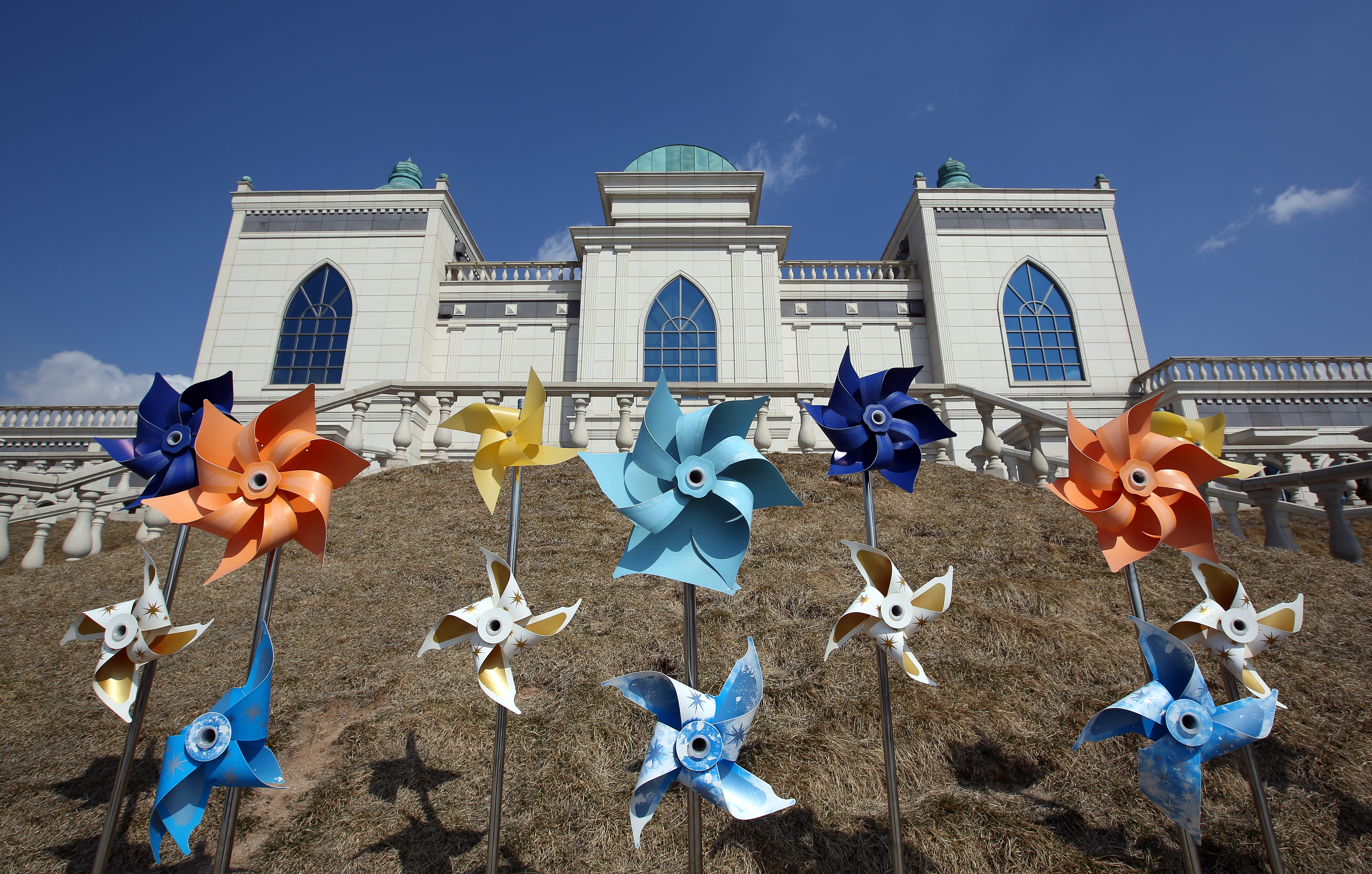
- Interactive map of Imsil Cheese Theme Park
- Location: Imsil-gun, Korea
- Coordinates: 35°37′58″N 127°18′05″E
- Opened: November 21, 2011
- Theme: Cheese
- Website: cheesepark.kr

Imsil Cheese Theme Park (Korean: 임실치즈테마파크) is a theme park in Imsil-gun, South Korea. Ideas for the theme park were proposed in 2010 to boost tourism in Imsil, and the theme park itself was opened in November 21, 2011. Imsil Cheese Theme Park features a museum about the history of the cheese industry in Imsil as well as facilities where participants get a chance to make their own cheese and see the cheesemaking process, as well as other entertainment facilities. Imsil Cheese Theme Park also hosts festivals throughout the year, namely the Aqua Festival during the summer, Imsil N Cheese Festival during the fall and the Santa Festival during the winter, and a rose festival will be hosted in the future during the spring.

== History ==
Around 2010, ideas for boosting the cheese industry in the area were first proposed by government officials in Imsil to boost tourism. The project, which was dubbed Imsil Cheese Valley, was set to be completed around May 2011. An amount of 39 billion South Korean won was used to invest in 139,066 square metres (35 acres) of land for the project. The project was expected to create 10 billion won worth of profit and enable up to 500,000 tourist visits to Imsil-gun per year. Over February 10–11, 2010, a workshop was held to discuss development of the cheese industry in the Imsil area as well as the proposed entertainment site, and on 28 February the council of Imsil-gun passed an ordinance allowing the establishment of the theme park. However, the theme park itself did not open to the public until November 21, 2011.

== Areas and attractions ==
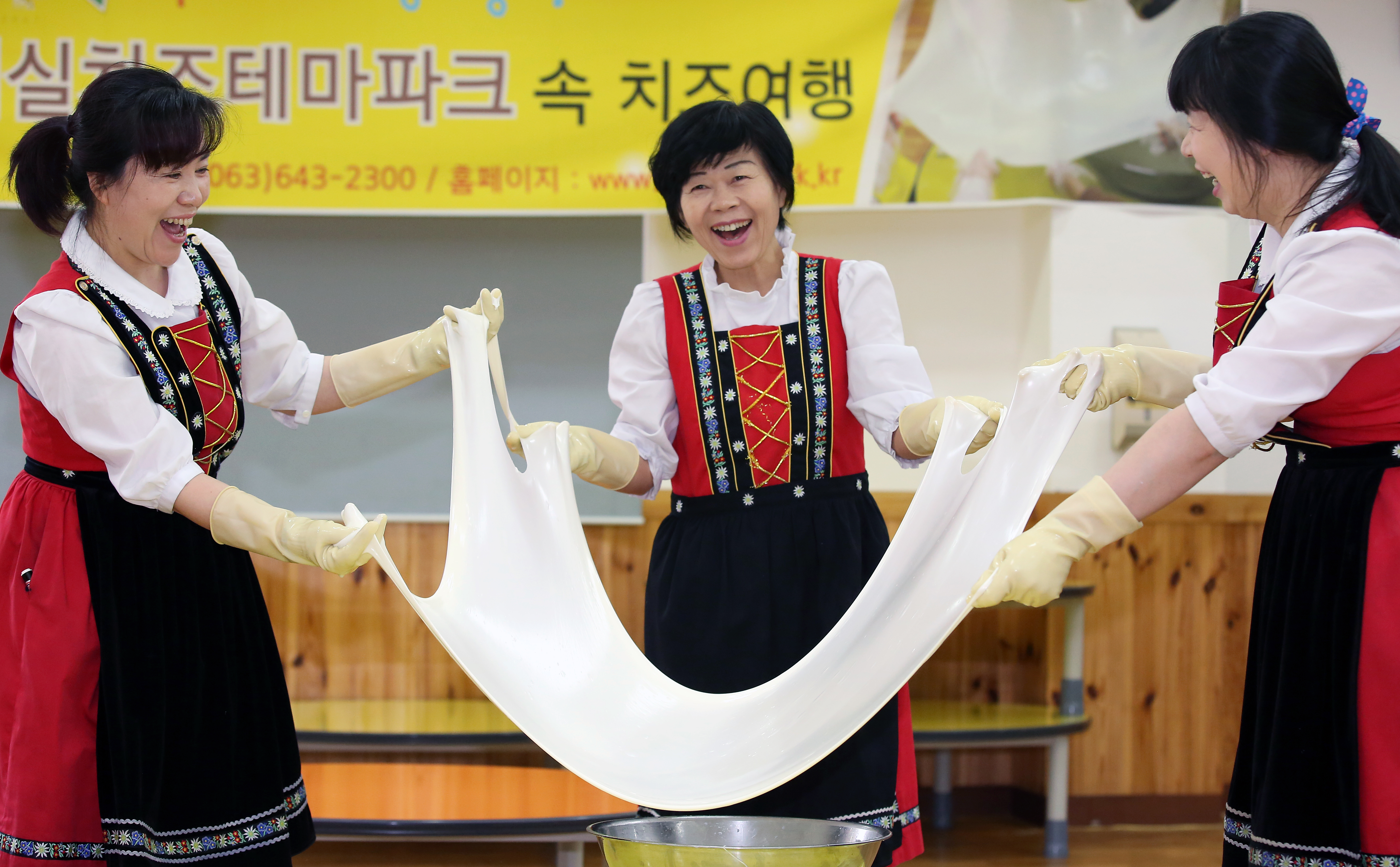
A cheesemaking demonstration at Imsil Cheese Theme Park

Imsil Cheese Theme Park features a castle built in a European style, which contains a museum about the history of cheese in Imsil as well as a restaurant which specializes in cheese. The park also has a food research and development facility where new food products and such are developed. There are also several facilities inside of the park where attendees can see the cheesemaking process as well as make cheese. Other facilities inside the park include a rose garden, a zoo, a 4D-movie theater and a children's playground.

=== Festivals ===
Imsil Cheese Theme Park hosts several festivals a year, namely the Aqua Festival, the Imsil N Cheese Festival and the Santa Festival. During the Aqua Festival, the park is converted into a water park for the summer. At the Imsil N Cheese Festival, visitors get a chance to take part in a variety of cheese-related activities such as making and buying cheese and also get to watch a cheese-related parade. During the Santa Festival, visitors can participate in Christmas-related activities including dressing up in Santa suits, go sledding and make gingerbread houses. A rose festival is planned for opening in the future during spring.

== See also ==
- BonBon-Land
- Cité du Vin
- Hersheypark
