= 1601 (Mark Twain) =

1880 literary work by Mark Twain

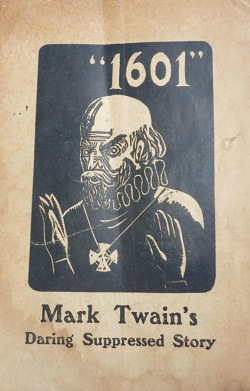
- 1882 edition
- Author: Mark Twain
- Original title: Conversation, as it was by the Social Fireside, in the Time of the Tudors
- Language: English

[Date: 1601.] Conversation, as it was by the Social Fireside, in the Time of the Tudors. or simply 1601 is the title of a short risqué squib by Mark Twain, first published anonymously in 1880, and finally acknowledged by the author in 1906.

Written as an extract from the diary of an "old man", Queen Elizabeth I's "cup-bearer", the pamphlet purports to record a conversation between Elizabeth and several famous writers of the day. The topics discussed are scatological, notably flatulence, flatulence humor, and sex.

1601 was, according to Edward Wagenknecht, "the most famous piece of pornography in American literature." However, it was more ribaldry than pornography; its content was more in the nature of irreverent and vulgar comedic shock than obscenity for sexual arousal.

Before the court decisions in the United States in 1959–1966 that legalized the publication of Lady Chatterley's Lover, Tropic of Cancer, and Fanny Hill, the piece continued to be considered unprintable. It was circulated clandestinely in privately printed limited editions.

== Content ==
The diarist describes a conversation in the presence of the queen between various famous Elizabethans during which one of the company passes gas:

"In ye heat of ye talk it befel yt one did breake wind, yielding an exceding mightie and distresfull stink, whereat all did laugh full sore."

The Queen asks about the source and receives various replies. "Lady Alice" and "Lady Margery" both deny passing gas, the first saying:

"Good your grace, an' I had room for such a thundergust within mine ancient bowels, 'tis not in reason I coulde discharge ye same and live to thank God for yt He did choose handmaid so humble whereby to shew his power. Nay, 'tis not I yt have broughte forth this rich o'ermastering fog, this fragrant gloom, so pray you seeke ye further."

Ben Jonson, Francis Bacon and William Shakespeare (referred to as 'Shaxpur') also deny having passed gas, though they have different opinions about the merits of flatulence. Bacon considers it a "great performance" beyond his abilities, and Shakespeare is astounded by its "firmament-clogging rottenness". Walter Raleigh admits to it, but confesses that it was not up to his usual standards, demonstrating his abilities by letting out an even louder one.

From there, the talk proceeds to manners and customs. Shakespeare tells a story about a prince with an enormous sexual appetite, taking ten "maidenheddes" a night followed by copious masturbation. Raleigh describes an American tribe, members of which have sex only once every seven years. The queen speaks to a young lady-in-waiting who comments on the growth of her pubic hair, on which Francis Beaumont compliments her. The queen says that Francois Rabelais had once told her about a man who had a "double pair" of bollocks, which leads to a discussion on the correct spelling of the word.

Shakespeare then reads from his works Henry IV and Venus and Adonis, which the diarist says she finds tedious. She then comments on the sexual misadventures of the people present, remarking that "when pricks were stiff and cunts not loathe to take ye stiffness out of them, who of this company was sinless". Alice and Margery were "whores from ye cradle", but now they are old and they spout religion. The characters then discuss the work of Cervantes and an up-and-coming young painter called Rubens.

The "diary" ends with a story told by Raleigh about a woman who avoided being raped by an "olde archbishoppe" by asking him to urinate in front of her, which rendered him impotent.

== Publication history ==
The squib was originally written in 1876 for "a highly respectable, all-male writing group" as an exercise in the style of Rabelais. It was first published in the "incredibly rare" Cleveland edition of 1880, which is believed to number only four copies. The original edition was anonymous. While visiting West Point in 1881, Twain discovered that a man he met, Charles Erskine Scott Wood, had access to a private printing press. Twain asked Wood to print off a new edition of fifty copies (now known as the "West Point edition"), which came out in 1882. Twain acknowledged authorship in 1906.

The skit remained unprintable by mainstream publishers until the 1960s. It continued to be published by small private presses. Its characterization as "pornography" was satirized by Franklin J. Meine in the introduction to the 1939 edition. Another little-known edition was printed from hand-set type by John Hecht in Chicago in 1951.

In 1978, the "Lazarus Edition" of 200 copies was published. It consisted of newly discovered pages of a private printing from the 1920s with a new, wood-engraved portrait of Mark Twain, made by Barry Moser.
