= The Reasons that Induced Dr. S. to Write a Poem Call'd the Lady's Dressing Room =

1734 poem by Lady Mary Wortley Montagu

- by Lady Mary Wortley Montagu
- Publication date: 1734

"The Reasons that Induced Dr. S. to Write a Poem Call'd the Lady's Dressing Room" is a poem by Lady Mary Wortley Montagu published in 1734. The poem is a satire and was written in response to a poem by Jonathan Swift titled "The Lady's Dressing Room". The poem is part of a poetic duel between the two poets, in which Montagu attacks Swift's character and suggests that he wrote "The Lady's Dressing Room" as a result of his sexual frustration and impotence. Both poems have been seen as satires of gender roles and stereotypes of the time, although Swift's poem has received greater praise and recognition.

== Summary ==
The poem is a narrative where "the Doctor", referring to Jonathan Swift, is the protagonist. The tale relates his journey one day to meet with a prostitute named Betty that he has been attempting to woo. After paying for her services, however, he finds himself experiencing an episode of impotence. He proceeds to blame his sexual failure on Betty and she returns his blame, allocating it to his old age. The Doctor insists that his money be returned to him but Betty refuses to do so. He swears vengeance, saying, "I'll so describe your dressing room / The very Irish shall not come". Here Montagu references Swift's poem, "The Lady's Dressing Room", and also slights Swift's Irish nationality. Betty the prostitute replies with another reference to Swift's poem saying, "I'm glad you'll write. / You'll furnish paper when I shite."

== Interpretation ==
The poem's biting satire obviously overtly attacks Dr. Swift and his writings. It also actively accuses Swift of misogyny and sexism. Swift's poem was highly invasive as it chronicles the unwanted entry of a man into a lady's dressing room where he sees the woman no longer as an elevated goddess, but as a normal human being with normal bodily functions. In his poem he attacks womankind, abasing them as vile and disgusting creatures. More importantly, the scene he depicts "unveils" the myth of femininity. The 18th century required women to be flawless, gentle and pure in public and private. Swift mocks them in both spheres, deeply desecrating the female image. He also brings their integrity into question, suggesting that they, through attempting to be clean, are hiding their inherent filthiness. Not everyone found Swift's satire tasteful, but his writing was very influential.

Montagu's poem, however, suggests that the hatred of women that inspired Swift to write his poem is actually just a result of his own sexual frustration and incapacity. In denouncing Swift's misogynistic views, Montagu also criticizes his pessimism in other subject areas. Swift was known as a satirist to be extremely cynical and critical of nearly everything. This poem stands to reason that all of Swift's pessimism is a result of internal issues and failures. Montagu mocks the double standard required for women; Swift invalidates females in both the public and private sphere and Montagu refutes this with cleverly pointed satire.

For both poems, the form is very significant. Their use of satire made their work possible. They could raise eyebrows without starting fires and question contradictory systems and values while eliciting pleased smiles. This form popularized their works.
