= Shinta Chō =

Japanese manga author (1927–2005)

Shinta Chō (Japanese: 長新太(ちょうしんた); September 24, 1927 - June 25, 2005) was a Japanese children's author and illustrator. He won the Japan Picture Book Awards Grand Prize for Kyabetsu-kun (Cabbage Boy) in 1981.

== Life ==
Chō was born Shuji Suzuki in Tokyo in 1928. He began illustrating cartoon strips in the late 1940s. He created the Talkative Fried Egg cartoon for a cartoon monthly in 1959. He also wrote children's books, including The Gas We Pass: The Story of Farts (Japan 1978, USA 1994).

== Awards ==
- 1959 - he won the Bungei Shunju Manga Award for Oshaberi na tamagoyaki (The Talkative Omelet)
- 1974 - he won an honourable mention in the Hans Christian Andersen Awards for Oshaberi na tamagoyaki (The Talkative Omelet)
- 1977 - he won the Kodansha Publication Culture Award for Children's Picture Books for Haru desu yo, Fukurō Obasan (Spring Is Here, Auntie Owl).
- 1981 - he won the Japan Picture Book Awards Grand Prize for Kyabetsu-kun (Cabbage Boy)
- 1986 - he won an award for Sakasama raion (Upside-Down Lion)
- 1994 - he received Japan's Medal with Purple Ribbon in recognition of his work as an artist and illustrator
- 1999 - he won a Japanese Picture Book Award for Gomu-atama Pontarō (Rubber-Headed Pontarō)
- 2002 - he won the ExxonMobil Children's Culture Award

== Children's books ==
- The Gas We Pass: The Story of Farts (Onara / おなら)
- Umph-a-Lumph, Meow (Tsumi-tsumi nya / つみつみニャー)
- Chorus of Winter Buds (Fuyume gasshodan / ふゆめがっしょうだん)
- The Easygoing Aquarium (Nonbiri suizokukan / ノンビリすいぞくかん)
- The Cats and Their Flying Machine (Gorogoro nyan / ごろごろ にゃーん)
- Up! Up! (Dakko, dakko, née dakko / だっこだっこねえだっこ)
- Rolling Kittens (Korokoro nyan / ころころにゃーん)
- A Worm Named Buddy (Mimizu no ossan / みみずのオッサン)
- Chomp! (Pakkun pakkun / ぱっくんぱっくん)
- Dakuchiru, Dakuchiru
- My Beach (Watashi no Umibe)
- The Talkative Omelet (Oshaberi na tamagoyaki)
- Spring is Here, Auntie Owl (Fukurō Obasan)
- Cabbage Boy (Kyabetsu-kun)
- Upside-Down Lion (Sakasama raion)
- Rubber-Headed Pontarō (Gomu-atama Pontarō)
