= Flatulence humor =

Form of toilet humor

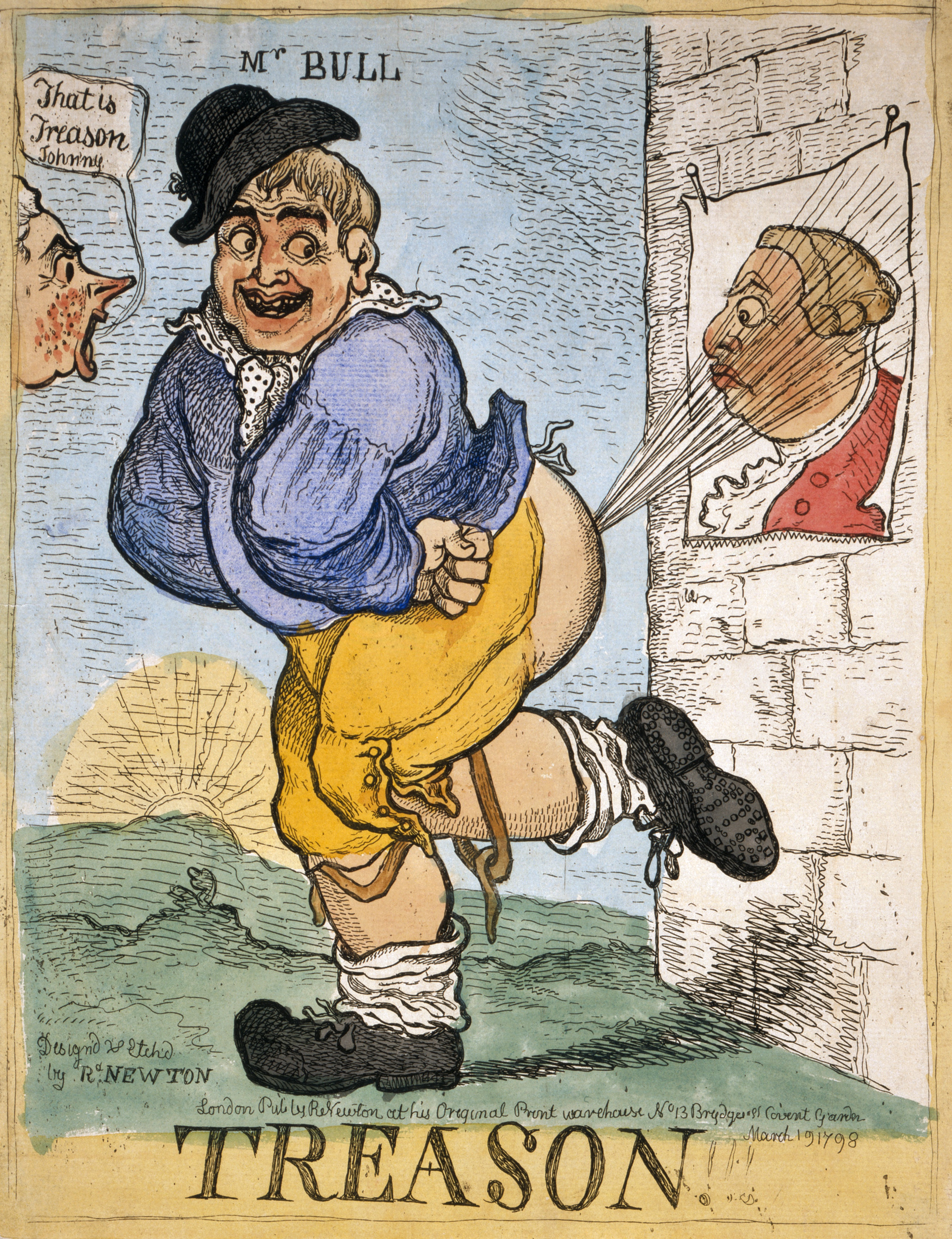
Farting in good cheer, 1798

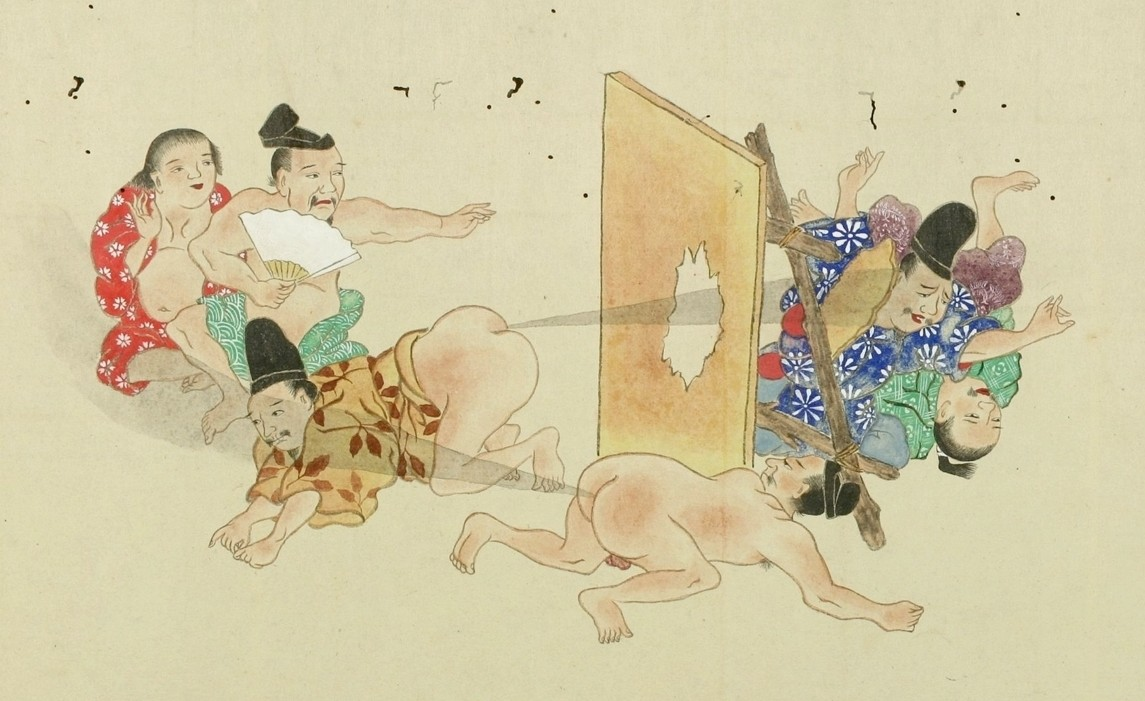
Farting contest depicted on the Waseda University He-gassen scroll

Flatulence humor (more commonly known as fart jokes) is a form of toilet humor that refers to flatulence. It can take the form of any type of joke, practical joke device, or other off-color humor.

== History ==
Although it is likely that flatulence humor has long been considered funny in cultures that consider the public passing of gas impolite, such jokes are rarely recorded. It has been suggested that one of the oldest recorded jokes was a flatulence joke from the Sumerians that has been dated to 1900 BC.

Something which has never occurred since time immemorial: a young woman did not fart in her husband’s lap.

Two important early texts are the 5th century BC plays The Knights and The Clouds, both by Aristophanes, which contain numerous fart jokes. Another example from classical times appeared in Apocolocyntosis or The Pumpkinification of Claudius, a satire attributed to Seneca on the late Roman emperor:

At once he bubbled up the ghost, and there was an end to that shadow of a life…The last words he was heard to speak in this world were these. When he had made a great noise with that end of him which talked easiest, he cried out, "Oh dear, oh dear! I think I have made a mess of myself."

He later explains he got to the afterlife with a quote from Homer: "Breezes wafted me from Ilion unto the Ciconian land."

Archeologist Warwick Ball asserts that the Roman Emperor Elagabalus played practical jokes on his guests, employing a whoopee cushion-like device at dinner parties.

In the translated version of Penguin's 1001 Arabian Nights Tales, the story "The Historic Fart" tells of a man who flees his country from the sheer embarrassment of farting at his wedding, only to return ten years later to discover that his fart had become so famous, that people used the anniversary of its occurrence to date other events. Upon learning this, he exclaimed, "Verily, my fart has become a date! It shall be remembered forever!" His embarrassment is so great, he returns to exile in India.

In a similar vein, John Aubrey's Brief Lives recounts of Edward de Vere, 17th Earl of Oxford that:

This earle of Oxford, making his low obeisance to Queen Elizabeth, happened to let a fart, at which he was so abashed that he went to travell 7 yeares. On his returne the Queen welcomed him home and sayd 'My lord, I had forgot the fart.'

One of the most celebrated incidents of flatulence humor in early English literature is in The Miller's Tale of The Canterbury Tales by Geoffrey Chaucer, which dates from the 14th century; his The Summoner's Tale has another. In the first, the character Nicholas sticks his buttocks out of a window at night and humiliates his rival Absolom by farting in his face. But Absolom gets revenge by thrusting a red-hot plough blade between Nicholas's cheeks ("ammyd the ers")

"Sing, sweet bird, I kneen nat where thou art!"
This Nicholas anon let fle a fart
As greet as it had been a thonder-dent
That with the strook he was almost yblent (blinded)
And he was ready with iron hoot
And Nicholas ammyd the ers he smoot.

The medieval Latin joke book Facetiae by Poggio Bracciolini includes six tales about farting.

François Rabelais' tales of Gargantua and Pantagruel are laden with acts of flatulence. In Chapter XXVII of the second book, the giant, Pantagruel, releases a fart that "made the earth shake for twenty-nine miles around, and the foul air he blew out created more than fifty-three thousand tiny men, dwarves and creatures of weird shapes, and then he emitted a fat wet fart that turned into just as many tiny stooping women."

The plays of William Shakespeare include several humorous references to flatulence, including the following from Othello:

CLOWN: Why masters, have your instruments been in Naples, that they speak i’ th’ nose thus?
MUSICIAN: How, sir, how?
CLOWN: Are these, I pray you, wind instruments?
MUSICIAN: Ay, marry, are they, sir.
CLOWN: O, thereby hangs a tail.
MUSICIAN: Whereby hangs a tale, sir?
CLOWN: Marry, sir, by many a wind instrument that I know.

Jonathan Swift's pseudomedical pamphlet The Benefit of Farting Explain'd satirizes the garrulous nature of women and the taboo surrounding their farts in polite society by arguing that permitting women fart would make them less talkative. His anonymously published work from the same year, Arse Musica; or, The Lady’s Back Report to Don Fart-in-hand-o Puff-in dorst, mocks the public’s enthusiasm for Italian opera and lists "Fifty Two Ladies of Quality" who were under fart pseudonyms. He revisits the taboo of women farting again in his 1734 poem Cassinus and Peter.

Benjamin Franklin, in his open letter "To the Royal Academy of Farting", satirically proposes that converting farts into a more agreeable form through science should be a milestone goal of the Royal Academy.

In Mark Twain's 1876 pamphlet 1601 a cupbearer at Court who's a Diarist reports:

In ye heat of ye talk it befel yt one did breake wind, yielding an exceding mightie and distresfull stink, whereat all did laugh full sore.

The Queen inquires as to the source, and receives various replies. Lady Alice says:

Good your grace, an' I had room for such a thundergust within mine ancient bowels, 'tis not in reason I coulde discharge ye same and live to thank God for yt He did choose handmaid so humble whereby to shew his power. Nay, 'tis not I yt have broughte forth this rich o'ermastering fog, this fragrant gloom, so pray you seeke ye further."

In the first chapter of Moby-Dick by Herman Melville, the narrator states:

...I always go to sea as a sailor, because of the wholesome exercise and pure air of the fore-castle deck. For as in this world, head winds are far more prevalent than winds from astern (that is, if you never violate the Pythagorean maxim)...

== Gallery of medieval flatulent-artwork ==
These images came from medieval manuscripts from the 13th and 14th centuries.

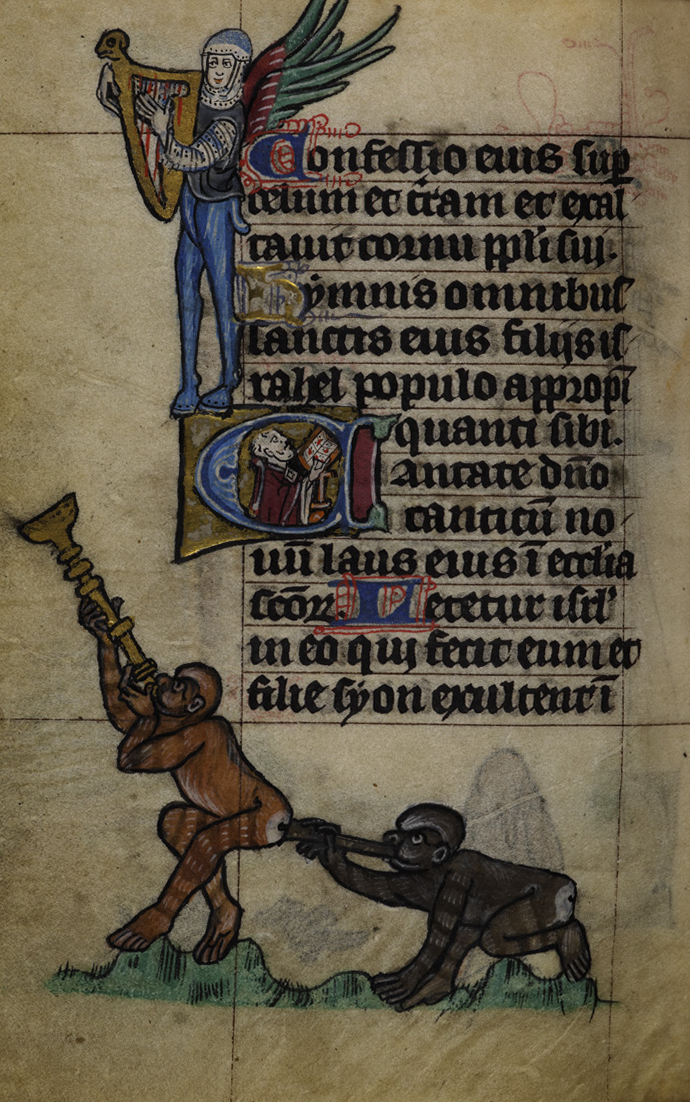

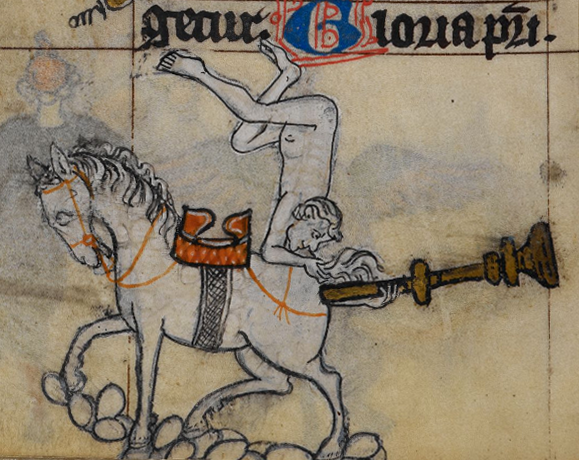

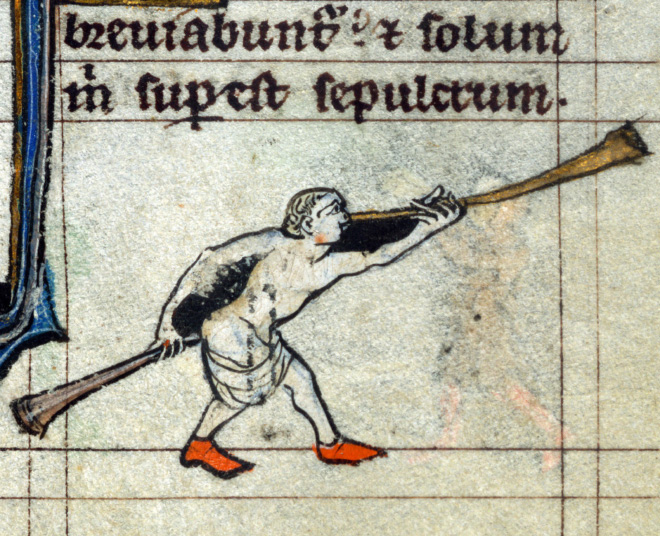

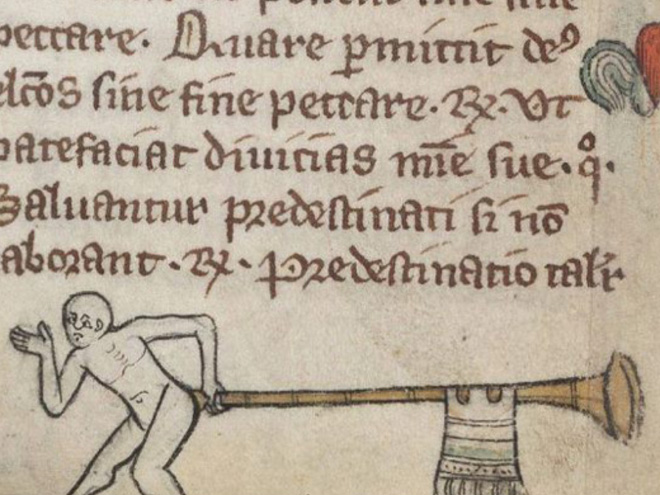

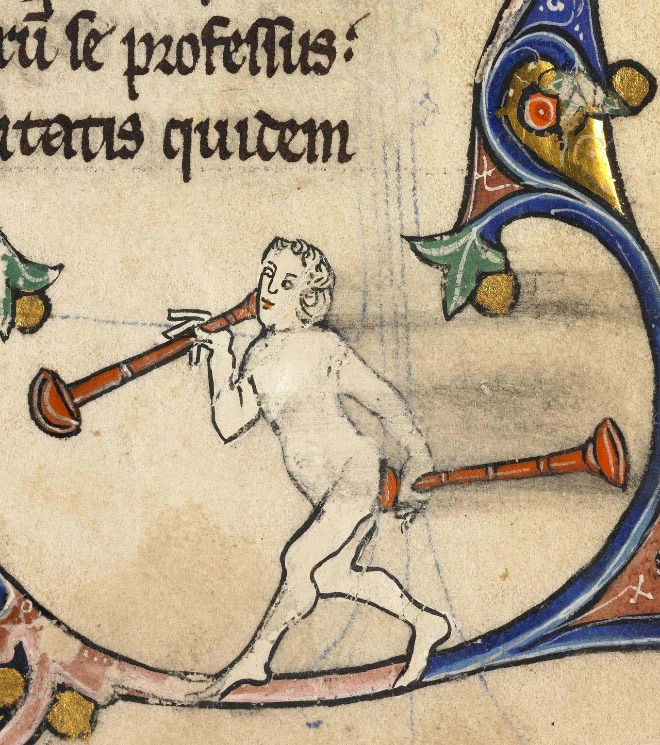

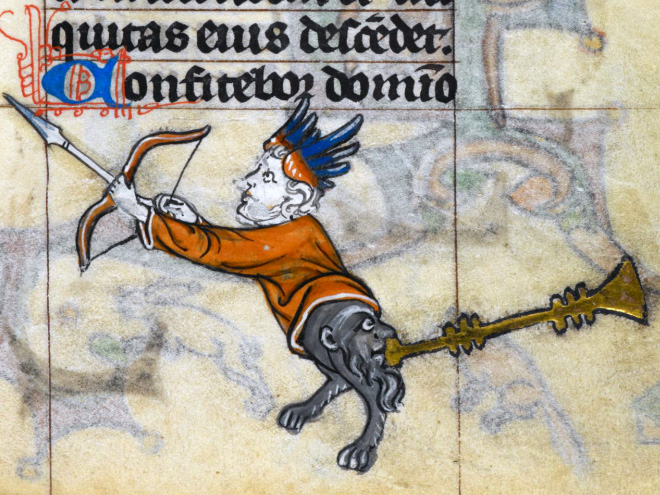

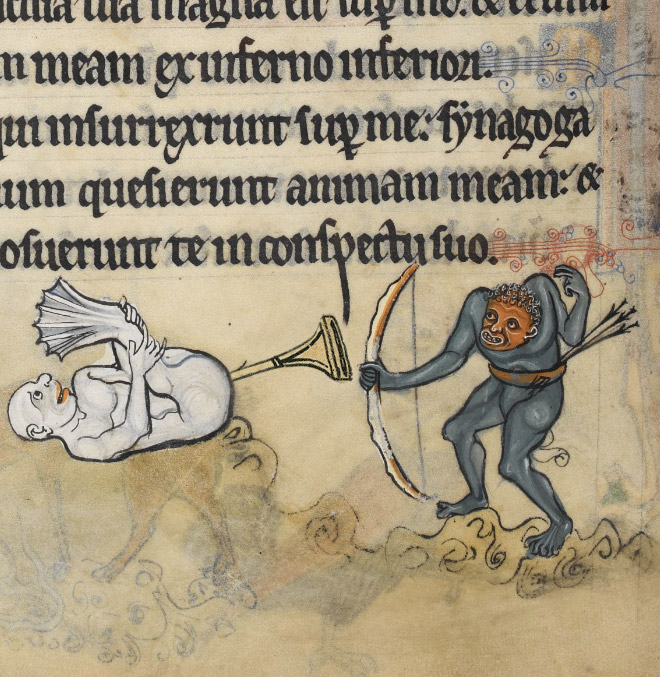

== Inculpatory pronouncements ==
The sourcing of a fart involves a ritual of assignment that sometimes takes the form of a rhyming game. These are frequently used to discourage others from mentioning the fart or to turn the embarrassment of farting into a pleasurable subject matter. The trick is to pin the blame on someone else, often by means of deception, or using a back and forth rhyming game that includes phrases such as the following:

The following begin with "He who ...", "She who ...", "They who ...", "Whoever ..." or "The one who ...":

- ...declared it blared it.
- ...observed it served it.
- ...detected it ejected it.
- ...rejected it respected it.
- ...smelt it dealt it.
- ...sang the song did the pong.
- ...denied it supplied it.
- ...said it spread it.
- ...said the rhyme did the crime.
- ...accuses blew the fuses.
- ...pointed the finger pulled the trigger.
- ...articulated it particulated it.
- ...introduced it produced it.
- ...inculpated promulgated.
- ...deduced it produced it.
- ...was a smart-ass has a fart-ass.
- ...sniffed it biffed it.
- ...eulogized it aerosolized it.
- ...sensed it dispensed it.
- ...rapped it cracked it.
- ...policed it released it.
- ...remarked on it embarked on it.
- ...circulated it perpetrated it.
- ...last spoke let off the ass smoke.
- ...said the words did the turds.
- ...rebuts it cuts it.
- ...said the rap did the crap.
- ...had the smirk did the work.
- ...spoke it broke it.
- ...asked it gassed it.
- ...started it farted it.
- ...explained it ordained it.
- ...thunk it stunk it.
- ...is squealing is concealing.
- ...thought it brought it.
- ...gave the call gassed us all.
- ...spoke last set off the blast.
- ...made a frown laid the brown.
- ...made the quip let it rip.
- ...'s poking fun is the smoking gun.
- ...did the tune did the fume.
- The smeller's the feller.
- It twas the thinker who loosened his sphincter.
- If you heard the song you've soiled your thong.
- Self report.

Assigning blame to another can backfire: a joke about royalty has the Queen emitting flatulence, and then turning to a nearby page, exclaiming, "Arthur, stop that!" The page replies, "Yes, Your Majesty. Which way did it go?"

== Practical jokes ==
Practical jokes include:

- Armpit fart
- Whoopee cushion
- Dutch oven

=== Dutch oven ===
A Dutch oven is a slang term for lying in bed with another person and pulling the covers over the person's head while flatulating, thereby creating an unpleasant situation in an enclosed space. This is done as a prank or by accident to one's sleeping partner. The Illustrated Dictionary of Sex by Keath Roberts refers to this as a Dutch treat.

== In art and entertainment ==
Some entertainers, called flatulist, used flatulence in a creative, musical, or amusing manner.

The following art movements or concepts include flatulence:

- Grotesque body
- Gross out

In addition to the historical works described above, the following works of art or entertainment use or refer to flatulence humor:

- He-gassen, Japanese art scroll from the Edo period
- Beans, Beans, the Musical Fruit
- Bum trilogy
- Fartman
- DogFart, American interracial pornography company
- Hundeprutterutchebane, Dog-Fart Roller Coaster in Denmark
