= The Gas We Pass =

Children's book

The Gas We Pass book cover

The Gas We Pass: The Story of Farts (おなら Onara) is a children's book written by Shinta Chō (長新太). It was first published in Japan in 1978; the first American edition was in 1994. The book tells children about flatulence (also known as farting), and that it is completely natural to do so.

The book also discusses animals and their habits of flatulence. The book explains why farts smell bad, and what animals only seem to fart (skunks and stink bugs).

The book is part of the My Body Science Set series of books.

== Publication history ==
The book was first published in Japan by Fukuinkan Shoten, and since has been translated into numerous languages, such as English, French, Portuguese, and Spanish. In the United States, it was published by Kane/Miller Book Publishers in 1994.

The New York Times reported in 1997 that The Gas We Pass had 380,000 copies in print and had made appearances on Publishers Weekly's children's books best-seller list. According to the Times, the publishers estimated that half the sales of The Gas We Pass and Everyone Poops were to adults for other adults. Publishers Weekly listed The Gas We Pass and other titles in the My Body Science series in a survey of children's books which continue to sell well year after year, noting that the series as a whole had sold over 2 million copies by 2003. In 2007, when Kane/Miller first had an exhibit at Toy Fair, Publishers Weekly noted that the publisher "displayed its spring titles as well as its bestsellers Everyone Poops and The Gas We Pass."
