= The Lady's Dressing Room =

1732 poem by Jonathan Swift

"The Lady's Dressing Room" is a poem written by Jonathan Swift first published in 1732. In the poem, Strephon sneaks into his sweetheart Celia's dressing room while she is away only to become disillusioned at how filthy and smelly it is. Swift uses this poem to satirize both women's vain attempts to match an ideal image and men's expectation that the illusion be real. For the grotesque treatment of bodily functions in this poem and in other works, Swift has been posthumously diagnosed as suffering from neurosis and the poem is considered an exemplar of Swift's "excremental vision".

== Summary ==
This poem chronicles the misadventure of Strephon as he explores the vacant dressing room of the woman he loves. Beginning with an ideal image of his sweetheart, he looks through the contents of her room, but encounters only objects that repulse him. He finds sweaty smocks, dirt-filled combs, greasy facecloths, grimy towels, snot-encrusted handkerchiefs, jars of spit, cosmetics derived from distilled puppies, pimple medication, stockings smelling of dirty toes and a mucky, rancid clothes chest. Beholding such squalor, culminating in the discovery of her chamber pot, which was "disguised" within a cabinet: "As from within Pandora's box, / When Epimetheus oped the locks, / A sudden universal crew / Of humane evils upward flew, / He still was comforted to find / That hope at last remained behind. / So Strephon, lifting up the lid / To view what in the chest was hid, / The vapours flew from out the vent. / But Strephon cautious never meant / The bottom of the pan to grope, / And foul his hands in search of hope." Here, Celia's chamber pot becomes the overwhelming symbol of her supposed flaws. Strephon is slapped with the reality that Celia (the name "Celia" means "heavenly") is not a "goddess", but as disgustingly human as he is, as shown in line 118: "Oh! Celia, Celia, Celia shits!" Ever after his discovery of Celia's nauseating dressing room, he can never look at women the same way again. In every woman, he sees through the powdered wigs and painted faces to the grime beneath.

Swift's poem ends with the narrator pitying the protagonist's inability to accept the physical reality of the woman he supposedly exalted: "Should I the Queen of Love refuse,/ Because she rose from stinking ooze?" The narrator suggests that Strephon's excessive disgust reaction deprives him of "all the charms of woman kind".

== Reception ==
Like many satires, the poem received enthusiastic praise from some readers and harsh condemnation from others. For example, it provoked a negative response from Lady Mary Wortley Montagu, in the form of her own poem “The Reasons that Induced Dr. S. to Write a Poem called The Lady’s Dressing Room.” In this poem, she argues that sexual frustration motivated "The Lady's Dressing Room". Montagu's poem suggests that Swift sought out a prostitute and couldn't perform sexually. He blames it on her, she on him, and she refuses to return the money he requests back. By Montagu's telling, Swift decides to get back at the prostitute by writing the poem.

Swift's poem has been seen positively as a critique of the lengths to which women go in order to meet the ideal image of the female body and of men's expectation that the illusion be real. On the other hand, it has also been seen as bitterly satirizing and deriding the human body and its functions in disgusting detail, from the viewpoint of someone who considered them repulsive. Swift's time was a period in which pretense and superficiality were the norm. He was often referred to as misanthropic, and "The Lady's Dressing Room" led him to be "accused of misogyny". Swift's offensive and "improper" content, as well as the harsh manner in which he presented it, led him to have a less than favorable reputation amongst his compatriots, especially women.

== Notes ==
=== Further reading ===
- Clark, John R. (1991) The modern satiric grotesque and its traditions
