= BonBon-Land =

Amusement park in Denmark

- Interactive map of BonBon-Land
- Location: Holme-Olstrup, Denmark
- Coordinates: 55°15′38″N 11°51′50″E
- Opened: 1992
- Owner: Parques Reunidos
- Operating season: April 1 - October 24

Attractions
- Total: 65
- Website: bonbonland.dk

BonBon Land is a 34-acre Danish amusement park located in Holme-Olstrup in the South of Zealand, approximately 100 km away from Copenhagen.

== History ==
The Bonbon Land theme park dates back to Danish sweets boiler, Michael Spangsberg. He began producing candies with names that children would find humorous, such as 'mågeklatter' (Seagull Droppings) 'hundeprutter' (Dog Farts) and 'tissebleer' (Pee Diapers).

As the candies became popular, consumers began wanting to tour the factory in Holme-Olstrup. However, the factory could not offer tours due to strict hygiene regulations, leading Michael Spangsberg to opening Bonbon-Land.

In 1992, the park opened with a mini candy factory, a cinema, a shop, and four small boats shaped like ducks located in a small pond. Bonbon Land’s park covered an area of 85.000 m² (21 acres), increasing to 110.000 m² (27 acres) after the Beaver Rafting course was finished in 1998. The park was expanded to its current size of 130.000 m² (32 acres) when the ’Vildsvinet’ ride was added in 2003.

BonBon Land was purchased by the Spanish entertainment company Parques Reunidos in 2007.

The most expensive attractions are the Beaver Rafting course, with a price of 32 million DKK (Danish Krones; 4.7 Million US Dollars), 'Vildsvinet', with an estimated price of 25 million DKK (3.7 Million US Dollars), and 'Hankatten,' with a price of 20 million DKK (3 Million US Dollars) as of 2024. The new amusements added in 2010 were 'Svend Svingarm' and a new 4D cinema. In 2012, it was ranked as one of the weirdest parks by Time Magazine.

Bonbon-Land has over 60 different attractions with 4 roller coasters, 2 water rides, various playgrounds, and a pirate track.

== Roller coasters ==
Ride name	Type	Opened in	Manufacturer	Additional information
Hundeprutterutchebane (The Farting Dog Switchback)	steel sit down	1993	Zierer	Reaches a speed of 18 mph (30 km) on a 420 ft long track (128m) and a height of 15 ft (4,5m); height limit none / 1,1m alone. Force One model, train 2x10.
Vild-Svinet (The Wild Boar)	Gerstlauer Eurofighter	2003	Gerstlauer	Reaches a speed of 45 mph (73 km) on a 1404 ft long track (428m) and a height of 72 ft (22m); height 1,25m. Euro Fighter model 500/8, the initial drop is at an angle of 97°.
Hankatten (Tom Cat)	steel sit down spinning wild mouse	2007	Gerstlauer	Reaches a speed of 34 mph (55 km) on a 1303 ft long track (397m) and a height of 53 ft (16m); height limit 1,1m. Spinning Coaster model 380/4, car 2+2.
Viktor Vandorm (Victor The Water Worm)	steel sit down	2009	Zierer	Reaches a speed of 33 mph (53 km) on a 2471 ft long track (750m) and a height of 46 ft (14m); height limit 1m. Tivoli Custom model, train 2x20.

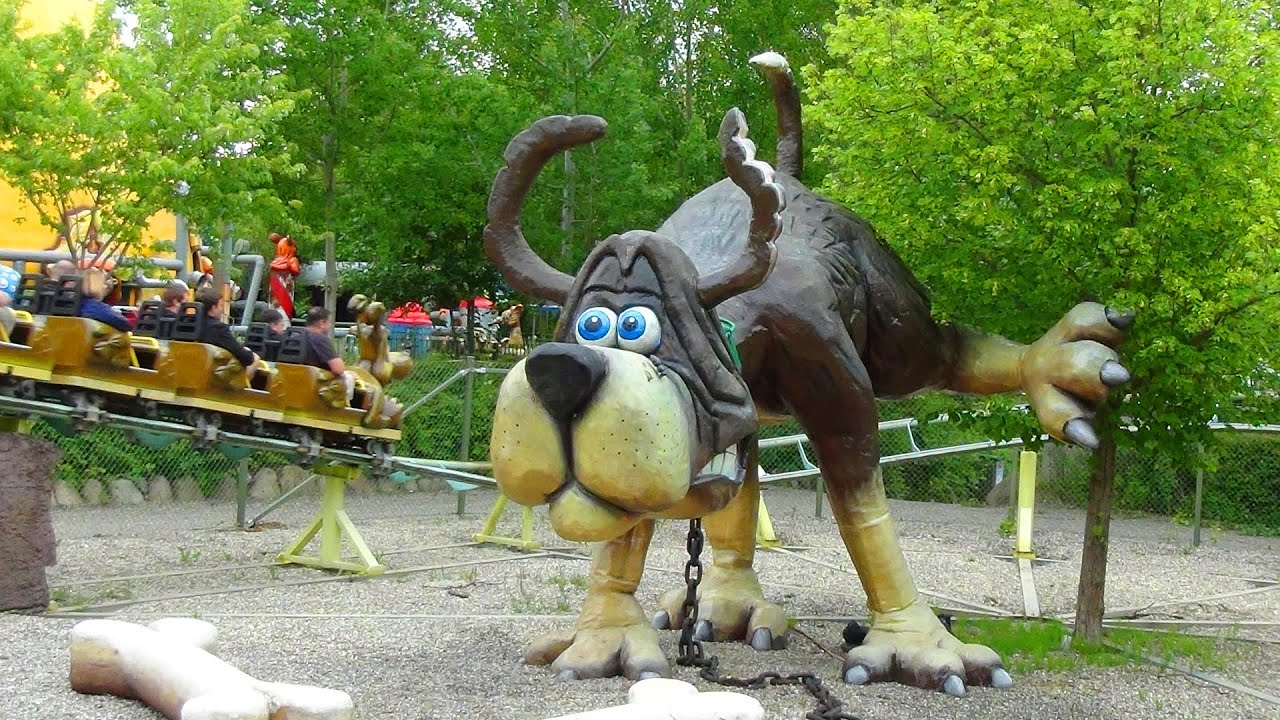
Hundeprutterutchebane

=== Water rides ===
Ride name	Type	Opened in	Manufacturer	Additional information
Beaver Rafting	river rapids ride	1998	Intamin	This 6-passenger raft ride is on a 560m long course.
The Water Rat	log flume ride	1995	CB Design	A 220m long ride that features 2 drops on the way.

=== Other rides ===
Ride name	Type	Opened in	Manufacturer	Additional information
The Albatross	disk	2004	Zamperla	height limit 1,1m.
The Cobra Tower	drop tower	2001	Fabbri	height limit 1,2m.
The Crow Trees	tower	2006	Premier Rides	height limit 1,2m.
Dillen (Mania)	air swing ride	1999	Huss	height limit none / 1,25m. alone Status: Closed 2013
Bon-Bio 4D	4D cinema	2010		currently showing The Little Prince (need different detail here)
Hestorado	stationary 5D interactive laser shoot-out	2011	Alterface	height limit 1,1m.
Klaptorsken (The Cod)	swinging pirate ship	2002	Metallbau Emmeln	height limit 1,1m.
Mågeklatterne	Radlerbahn	2002	Zierer	
Sprutten	Dragon Boats	2002	Zierer	
Paradise	walkthrough Candy Store	1992		
Søløven (The Sea Lion)	dark boat ride	2005	CB Design	
Svend The Swinging Arm	giant swing	2009	Zamperla	height limit 1,4m.
Skildpadden (The Tortoise)	wave swinger	1994	Zierer	
The Worm	roundabout ride	Year	Manufacturer	Details

* The raccoon tower

=== Kiddie rides ===
Ride name	Type	Opened in	Manufacturer	Additional information
The Dragon	Himalaya-style ride			
Fantasy World	walkthrough	2009		fantasy-themed scenes and kiddie play area
Hot Wheels	driving area	2006		kids can operate cars, mini trucks, excavators
Hestepærerne	on-track horse ride	1999	Metallbau Emmeln	
Play Areas	play area			various different play areas(needs different description)
The Shrimp	dinghy ride			
Trampolines	trampolines			
Walk the Plank	challenge course			
The Wet Dolphin	water playground	2007		

=== Other ===
The park has Arcade Games, various Test-Your-Skill Games, and a Kiddie Show.

== Picture gallery ==
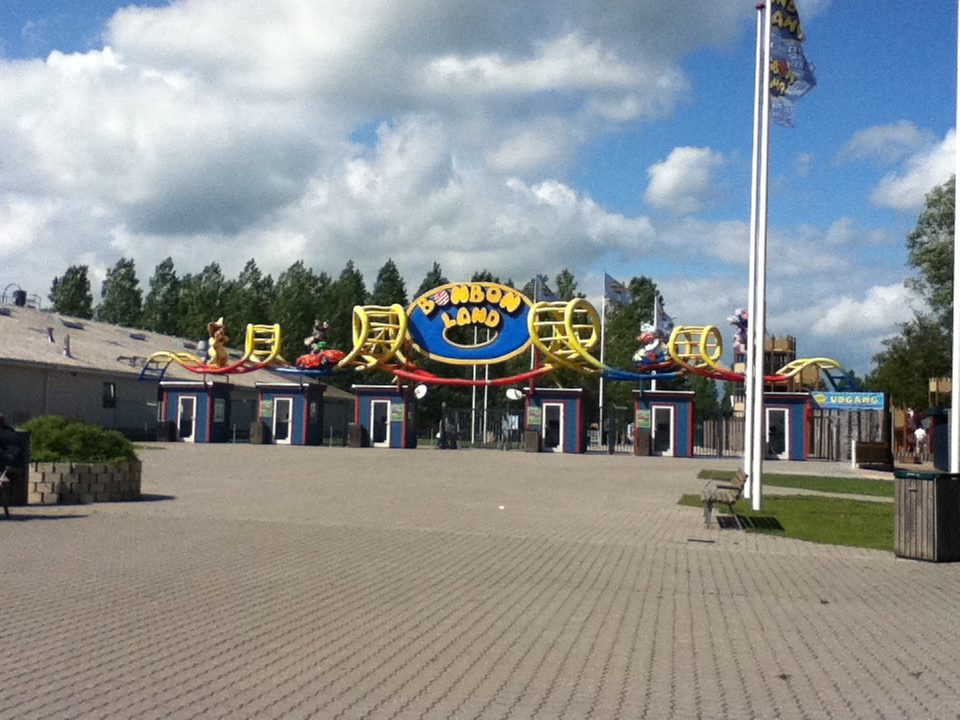
Entrance to the park

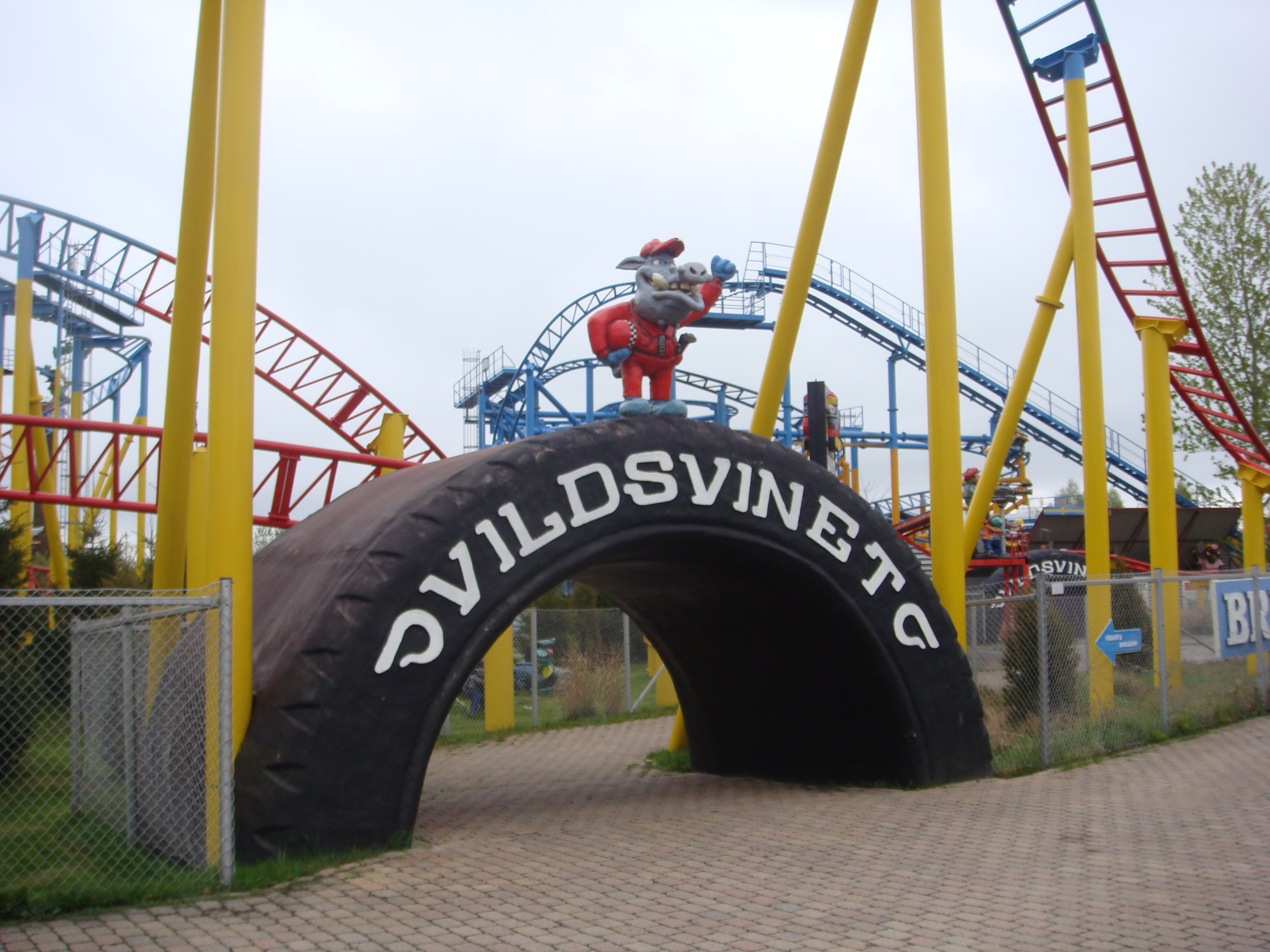
Vildsvinet ride

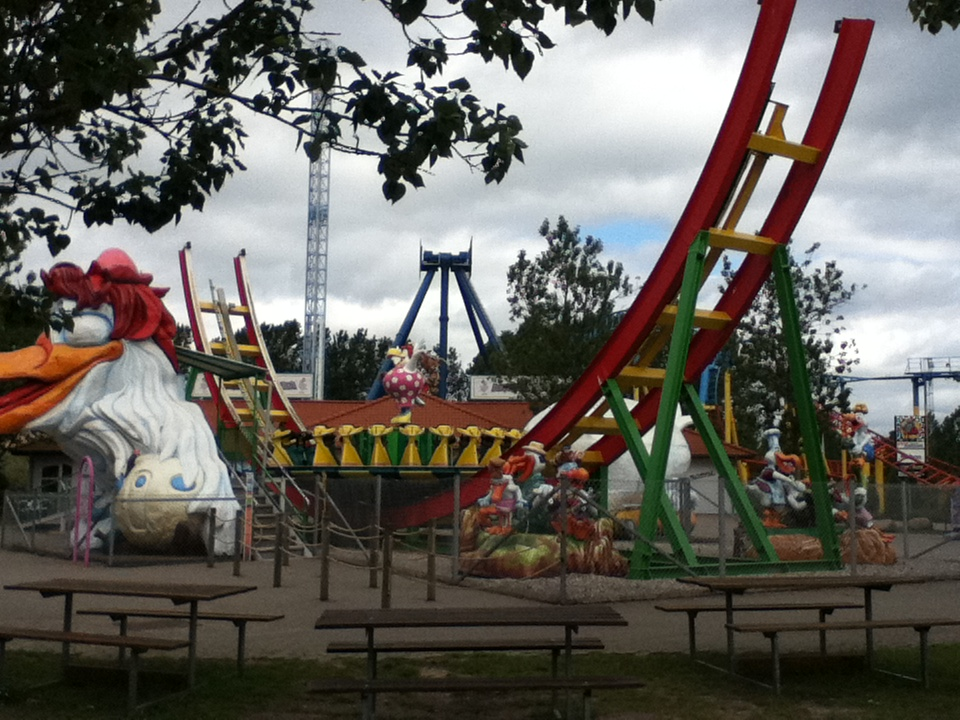
Albatross ride

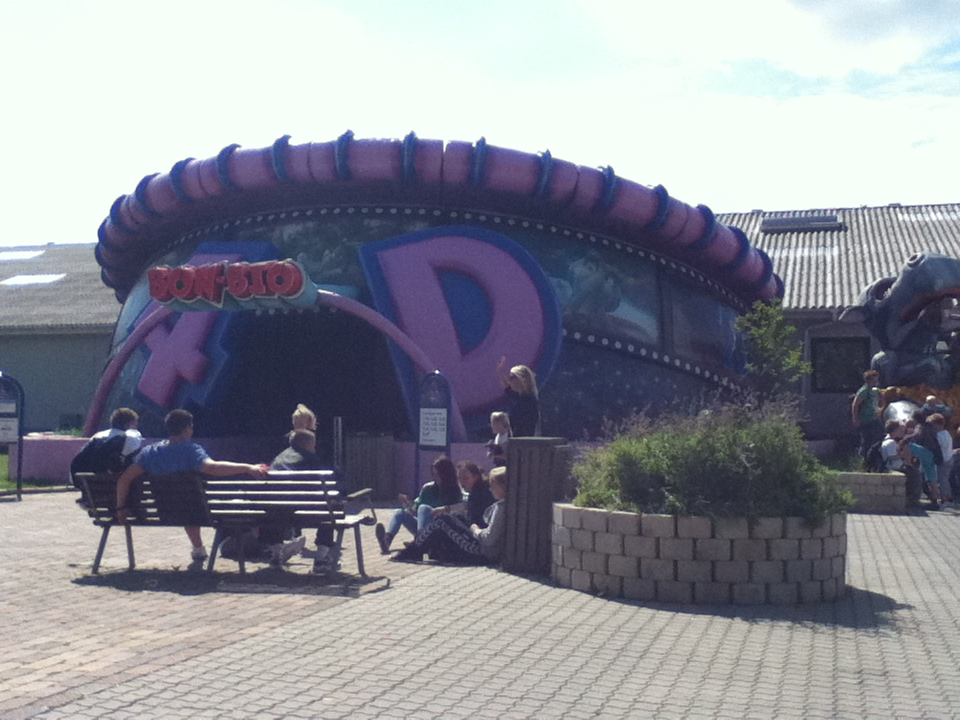
4D Cinema
