= He-gassen =

Japanese art scroll depicting fart-based humour

He-gassen (Japanese: 屁合戦, lit. 'Fart competitions'), or Hōhi-gassen (放屁合戦, lit. ''Fart fight''), designates a humorous theme (genre) in a Japanese art scrolls (often also the titles of the scrolls themselves), created during the Edo period (1603–1868) and earlier by various artists, often preferring to remain anonymous, depicting flatulence humor.

He-gassen, as a subject occasionally depicted in Japanese art, is first attested at the end of the Heian Period (794–1185). Toba Sōjō (1053–1140), in addition to his famous Scrolls of Frolicking Animals, is also mentioned as having painted scrolls on themes such as "Phallic Contest" and "He-gassen".

== Notable examples ==
- Kachie Emaki (勝得絵巻) (scroll), anonymous (15th century, copy of earlier work), Mitsui Memorial Museum.
- Hōhi Gassen Emaki (放屁合戦絵巻) (scroll; 1449, copy of earlier work) Suntory Museum of Art.
- Hōhi Gassen Zu (放屁合戦図) (sliding screen) The Museum of Art, Kōchi.
- Hōhi Gassen Emaki (放屁合戦絵巻) (two scrolls) by Kawanabe Kyōsai (1867), Kawanabe Kyosai Memorial Museum (in Warabi, Saitama). Separately, a parody by Kyōsai from 1876, bearing the title Fart Contest as Japan Adopts Western Culture Illustrated Scroll (開化放屁合戦絵巻), is in a private collection.
- Onara Gassen (於那羅合戦) by Ogawa Usen (1921), Fukushima Prefectural Museum of Art.

== Waseda University scroll ==
One scroll in the possession of the Waseda University Library has been digitized. The Waseda University scroll ends on the far left with a colophon, stating that this is an 1846 work by a 69-year-old Fukuyama painter called Airan (福山 画師 六十九歳 相覧; Fukuyama eshi roku jū kyū-sai Airan), being a copy of a 1680 original painted by Hishikawa Moronobu. The artist is possibly Murakata Airan (1778 – c.1846).

Read right-to-left, the scroll begins with a scene of men of various ranks (the lacquered black caps indicate court ranks, the others are commoners) spreading news of a fart contest, scenes of men passing along the news and carrying baskets of taro, and a cooking scene where the food is being prepared and eaten.

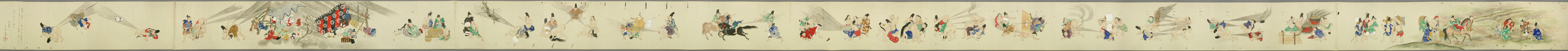
Complete He-gassen scroll (drag or swipe to view)
