= Vaginal flatulence =

Body function in humans

Vaginal flatulence or vaginal wind is an emission or expulsion of air from the vagina. It may occur during or after sexual intercourse, or during other sexual acts, stretching or exercise. The sound is comparable to anal flatulence, but vaginal flatulence does not involve waste gases, and thus does not have a specific odor associated with it. Slang terms for vaginal flatulence include queef, vart, pussy fart, and fanny fart (mostly British). Tampons can treat or prevent vaginal wind.

== Serious conditions ==
Vaginal gas with a strong odor of fecal matter may be a result of rectovaginal fistula, a serious condition involving a tear between the vagina and colon, which can result from surgery, childbirth, diseases (such as Crohn's disease), or other causes. This condition can lead to urinary tract infection and other complications. Vaginal gas can also be a symptom of an internal pelvic organ prolapse, a condition most often caused by childbirth.

Puffs or small amounts of air passed into the vaginal canal during cunnilingus are not known to cause any issues. However, "forcing" or purposely blowing air at force into the vaginal canal can cause an air embolism, which in very rare cases can be dangerous for the woman, and if pregnant, for the fetus.
