= Innocent prisoner's dilemma =

Advantages to falsely admitting guilt

The innocent prisoner's dilemma, or parole deal, is a detrimental effect of a legal system in which admission of guilt can result in reduced sentences or early parole. When an innocent person is wrongly convicted of a crime, legal systems which need the individual to admit guilt—as, for example, a prerequisite step leading to parole—punish an innocent person for their integrity, and reward a person lacking in integrity. There have been cases where innocent prisoners were given the choice between freedom, in exchange for claiming guilt, and remaining imprisoned and telling the truth. Individuals have died in prison rather than admit to crimes that they did not commit, including in the face of a plausible chance at release.

United States law professor Daniel Medwed says convicts who go before a parole board maintaining their innocence are caught in a catch-22 that he calls "the innocent prisoner's dilemma". A false admission of guilt and remorse by an innocent person at a parole hearing may prevent a later investigation proving their innocence.

== Detriment to individuals ==
=== In the United Kingdom ===
Michael Naughton, founder of the Innocence Network UK (INUK), says work carried out by the INUK includes research and public awareness on wrongful convictions, which can affect policy reforms. Most important is the development of a system to assess prisoners maintaining innocence, to distinguish potentially innocent prisoners from the prisoners who claim innocence for other reasons like "ignorance, misunderstanding or disagreement with criminal law; to protect another person or group from criminal conviction; or on 'abuse of process' or technical grounds in the hope of achieving an appeal." The system, he says, is being adopted by the prison parole board and prison service for prisoners serving "indeterminate sentences (where the prisoner has no release date and does not get out until a parole board decides he or she is no longer a risk to the public). Previously, such prisoners were treated as 'deniers' with no account taken of the various reasons for maintaining innocence, nor the fact that some may actually be innocent." Those prisoners are unable to achieve parole unless they undertake offence-behaviour courses that require the admission of guilt as a prerequisite. This was represented in the Porridge episode Pardon Me. However, in recent years, this has diminished in significance; at the time Simon Hall ended his denials to murder in 2012, the Ministry of Justice denied that this would have any impact on his tariff, and his last online posting had been concerned with being released from prison in spite of his denials.

Linda Cook was murdered in Portsmouth on 9 December 1986. Michael Shirley, an 18-year-old Royal Navy sailor, was wrongly convicted of the crime and sentenced to life imprisonment. After serving the minimum 15 years, Shirley would have been released from prison had he confessed to the killing to the parole board, but he refused to do so and said: "I would have died in prison rather than admit something I didn't do. I was prepared to stay in forever if necessary to prove my innocence." Shirley's conviction was eventually quashed by the Court of Appeal in 2003, on the basis of exculpatory DNA evidence.

Stephen Downing was a 17-year-old council worker convicted and imprisoned in 1974 for the murder of a 32-year-old legal secretary, Wendy Sewell. His conviction was overturned in 2002 after Downing had served 27 years in prison. The case was thought to be the longest miscarriage of justice in British legal history, until the exoneration of Peter Sullivan, and it attracted worldwide media attention. The case was featured in the 2004 BBC drama In Denial of Murder. Downing claimed that had he falsely confessed he would have been released over a decade earlier. Because he did not admit to the crime, he was classified as "IDOM" (In Denial of Murder) and ineligible for parole under English law.

Andrew Malkinson was wrongfully convicted of the rape of a 33-year-old woman in Salford, Greater Manchester, in 2003 and imprisoned. He would have been eligible for release after 6½ years of imprisonment, but his refusal to wrongly confess meant that authorities refused to grant parole. He was released after 17 years in prison, and was declared innocent by the Court of Appeal in July 2023. The case has been academically studied as a severe miscarriage of justice.

=== In the United States ===
In the United States the reality of a person being innocent, called "actual innocence", is not sufficient reason for the justice system to release a prisoner. Once a verdict has been made, it is rare for a court to reconsider evidence of innocence that could have been presented at the time of the original trial. Decisions by the State Board of Pardons and Paroles regarding its treatment of prisoners who may be actually innocent have been criticized by the international community.

Herbert Murray was convicted of murder in 1979. In a news interview, Murray says he went before a parole board four times, maintaining his innocence until the fifth time: "I said what the hell, let me tell these people what they want to hear." He admitted to the parole board that he committed the crime and was taking responsibility. "I felt like I sold my soul to the devil. Because before, I had that strength, because I stood on the truth. [...] I became so desperate to get out, I had to say something. I had to say something because what I said before didn't work." His parole was denied. After 29 years in prison, Medwed's Second Look clinic, a group dedicated to the release of innocent prisoners, assisted lawyers in his eighth parole board hearing which was successful, releasing him onto indefinite parole. However, overturning the original conviction would be hampered by his admissions of guilt at his parole hearings.

Timothy Brian Cole (1960–1999) was an African American military veteran and a student wrongly convicted of raping a fellow student in 1985. Cole was convicted by a jury of rape, primarily based on the testimony of the victim, Michele Mallin. He was sentenced to 25 years in prison. While incarcerated, Cole was offered parole if he would admit guilt, but he refused. "His greatest wish was to be exonerated and completely vindicated", his mother stated in a press interview. Cole died after serving 14 years in prison. Another man, Jerry Wayne Johnson, confessed to the rape in 1995. Further, Mallin later admitted that she was mistaken as to the identity of her attacker. She stated that investigators botched the gathering of evidence and withheld information from her, causing her to believe that Cole was the perpetrator. Mallin told police that the rapist smoked during the rape. However, Cole never smoked because of his severe asthma. DNA evidence later showed him to be innocent. Cole died in prison on December 2, 1999; ten years later, a district court judge announced "to a 100 percent moral, factual and legal certainty" that Timothy Cole did not commit the rape, posthumously exonerating him.

The dilemma can occur even before conviction. Kalief Browder was arrested in May 2010 for allegedly stealing a backpack. He spent the next three years on Rikers Island awaiting trial, much of it in solitary. During court appearances, prosecutors routinely asked for a short delay which would turn into a much lengthier wait. At times, Browder was offered plea bargains, and at one point, he was encouraged to plead guilty to misdemeanors, for which he would be sentenced to time already served and released. When he refused the plea deal, insisting on his innocence, the judge noted "If you go to trial and lose, you could get up to fifteen [years]." Eventually, in May 2013, the case was dismissed because prosecutors had lost contact with the only witness they had to the alleged crime.

== Detriment to society ==
A British conference in 2011 concluded that "Denial is not a valid measure of risk. In fact, research has shown that prisoners who openly admit to their crimes have the highest risk of re-offending."

In 2011, Michael Naughton suggested the focus on new evidence by the Criminal Cases Review Commission, rather than an examination of serious problems with evidence at original trials, meant in many cases "that the dangerous criminals who committed these crimes remain at liberty with the potential to commit further serious crimes."

Robert A. Forde cited two studies at the conference. One, a ten-year study of 180 sex offenders by Harkins, Beech and Goodwill found prisoners who claimed to be innocent were the least likely to be re-convicted, and that those who 'admitted everything', claiming to be guilty, were most likely to re-offend. He also told the conference research by Hanson et al. in 2002, the denial by the prisoner of their offences had no bearing on their likelihood of re-offending.

== See also ==
- Alford plea
- Alternative pleading
- Recidivism
- List of wrongful convictions in the United States
