= Wrongful conviction of Victor Nealon =

Wrongful conviction of rape in the UK

The wrongful conviction of Victor Nealon occurred in 1996 when the British postman Victor Nealon was mistakenly convicted of attempted rape. He was released in 2013 by the Court of Appeal after spending 17 years in jail, 10 years more than his recommended tariff, because he continued to protest his innocence. He was sentenced to a discretionary life sentence in 1998 and was refused parole because he refused to admit guilt. He was denied legal aid and in 2014, the Ministry of Justice turned down his claim for compensation and demanded he pay £2,500 costs claiming the DNA analysis "did not show beyond reasonable doubt that the claimant did not commit the offence."

The Criminal Cases Review Commission commented that they should have investigated the case more thoroughly. Commission chairman Richard Foster said "I regret the fact in this particular case we missed something and I apologise to all concerned for the fact we did so."

== See also ==
- List of miscarriage of justice cases
- Wrongful conviction of Andrew Malkinson, who also spent longer in jail because he maintained his innocence.
