= Kiselevsky =

Kiselevsky/Kiselyovsky (masculine), Kiselevskaya/Kiselyovskaya (feminine), or Kiselevskoye/Kiselyovskoye (neuter) may refer to:

- Kiselyovsky Urban Okrug, a municipal formation in Kemerovo Oblast, which the city of Kiselyovsk is incorporated as
- Kiselevsky (rural locality) (Kiselevskaya, Kiselevskoye), name of several rural localities in Russia
