= Raphael Rowe =

Television broadcast journalist (born 1968)

- Born: 11 March 1968 (age 58); London, England
- Occupation: Television journalist
- Years active: 2000–present
- Children: 3

Raphael Rowe (born 11 March 1968) is a British broadcast journalist and presenter, who was convicted in 1990 for a 1988 murder and series of aggravated robberies as part of the M25 Three. After nearly twelve years incarcerated, his convictions, along with those of his two co-defendants Michael J. George Davis and Randolph Egbert Johnson, were ruled unsafe in July 2000 and they were released.

== Early life ==
Raphael George Rowe was born in South-East London and named after his father, who had emigrated from Jamaica at the age of 26. His British mother, Rosemary Prior, was 17 when she married Raphael Sr. They had three daughters before Raphael Jr was born in 1968.

== Convictions ==
In the early hours of 16 December 1988, three masked men, one carrying a knife, another a gun, beat and tied up Peter Hurburgh and Alan Eley, who were having sex in a car parked in a field. During the attack, Hurburgh died of a heart attack. Later that morning the three men committed two home robberies and stabbed one of the occupants, 40-year-old Timothy Napier. Rowe and Davis were arrested on the morning of 19 December and Johnson on 6 January 1989. They were dubbed the M25 Three by the media, due to the locations of the crimes. They were interrogated for three days. The victims stated there were two white perpetrators and one black; however, all three defendants were black. Victims also described an attacker with blue eyes and fair hair, which matched none of the three accused. Rowe's girlfriend at the time of the attack, Kate Williamson, testified against him at trial. She later sent a letter to him in prison admitting to and apologising for lying. In March 1990 the three were sentenced to life imprisonment without parole at the Old Bailey for murder and aggravated robbery.

=== Appeal and release ===
In 1994, Davis and Rowe made an application to the European Court of Human Rights (ECtHR). Along with errors and other evidence withheld before the trial, it had not been disclosed to Rowe's lawyers that the key prosecution witness, Norman Duncan, was a known criminal with previous convictions, and prior to the trial had become a police informant. On 16 February 2000, the ECtHR returned their judgment and found that there had been a violation of Article 6 (1) of the ECtHR, the right to a fair trial. In 1999 the Criminal Cases Review Commission referred the M25 Three case back to the Court of Appeal and on 17 July 2000 Rowe and his co-defendants were acquitted and released. Rowe has always maintained his innocence and has said he believes the police conspired with witnesses.

== Career ==
During his incarceration, Rowe studied journalism through a correspondence course and, after his release, joined the BBC in early 2001 as a reporter for BBC Radio 4.

In 2003, Rowe began presenting various BBC programmes and in 2006 joined BBC One Panorama. His Panorama documentary on the conviction of Barry George for the murder of Jill Dando was considered a significant factor in his (George's) eventual acquittal.

He became freelance in 2016 and in 2017 he was one of the celebrities who walked the Camino de Santiago in Spain for the BBC Two series Pilgrimage: The Road to Santiago.

Rowe is currently a reporter on the BBC One series The One Show and Sunday Morning Live. Since 2018, he has hosted Inside the World's Toughest Prisons, commissioned by Netflix. In August 2020 he released his podcast Second Chance.

His memoir and autobiography, Notorious, was released in December 2020. He has attributed his success as a journalist to his conviction and incarceration for a crime he did not commit.

== Personal life ==
Rowe had been dating a woman prior to being incarcerated. He has said that they got back in contact two months after his release. They had their first child in the summer of 2004.

He stated in 2000 he has a son from a previous relationship. Rowe has said his son was reluctant to see him due to the accusations against him.

== See also ==
- Andrew Malkinson - British man wrongly convicted of rape who served 20 years in prison before his conviction was overturned.
