= Brandvlei (disambiguation) =

Brandvlei is a town in the Northern Cape province of South Africa.

Brandvlei may also refer to:

- Brandvlei, Gauteng, an informal settlement in Gauteng province, South Africa
- Brandvlei Correctional Centre, a prison in the Western Cape province, South Africa.
- Brandvlei Dam, a dam in the Western Cape.
