= Simon Hall (murderer) =

British murderer who falsely claimed innocence

- Born: 1977 or 1978
- Died: 23 February 2014 (age 36); HM Prison Wayland, Norfolk, England
- Cause of death: Suicide by hanging
- Known for: Confessing to murder after miscarriage of justice activists had campaigned for him
- Criminal charge: Murder
- Criminal penalty: Life imprisonment with a minimum tariff of 15 years imprisonment
- Criminal status: Deceased

Simon Hall (1977 or 1978 – 23 February 2014) was a British murderer who was the subject of a lengthy campaign by miscarriage of justice activists to overturn his conviction, only for him to later confess to the murder he was convicted of. Hall stabbed 79-year-old pensioner Joan Albert to death in her home in Capel St Mary, Suffolk in 2001, and was convicted of her murder two years later.

The investigative programme Rough Justice subsequently took up Hall's case and aired a programme campaigning for him. Several MPs, Bristol University's "Innocence Project" campaign group, his mother and his girlfriend Stephanie Hall were also involved in campaigning for him, and the Criminal Cases Review Commission (which had itself been set up in response to Rough Justice in 1997) referred his case to the Court of Appeal in 2009. However, the appeal court dismissed the appeal and he subsequently confessed his crime to prison authorities in 2013, before committing suicide in prison in 2014. His case was said to have gravely undermined the claims of many prisoners who claim their innocence and embarrassed miscarriage of justice activists, having proved that they had campaigned for a guilty man.

The family of victim Joan Albert released a statement following Hall's confession saying: "During the last 10 years the publicity surrounding the appeals has been very distressing for our family, making moving on impossible... we are also grateful to those who have helped us throughout this difficult ordeal".

== Murder ==
Hall was a burglar and had previous convictions for violence. He murdered Joan Albert, 79, in her home in Capel St Mary, Suffolk on 16 December 2001 in a burglary attempt gone wrong, stabbing her five times with a carving knife from her kitchen and leaving her to be found in her hallway. Hall had been out drinking with friends in Ipswich the night before the murder and had an alibi for most of the night and into the early hours of the following morning, except for between 5:30am and 6:15am, which was believed to be the time when the murder was committed. He was convicted of her murder in 2003 and sentenced to a minimum term of 15 years imprisonment, with the jury finding him guilty by a unanimous decision.

== Claims of innocence and assistance ==
"There was never a shadow of a doubt that they had the wrong guy, he didn't have it in him – he's too sensitive and kind."

— Hall's wife Stephanie, who he married in prison, declaring that he was innocent in 2009.

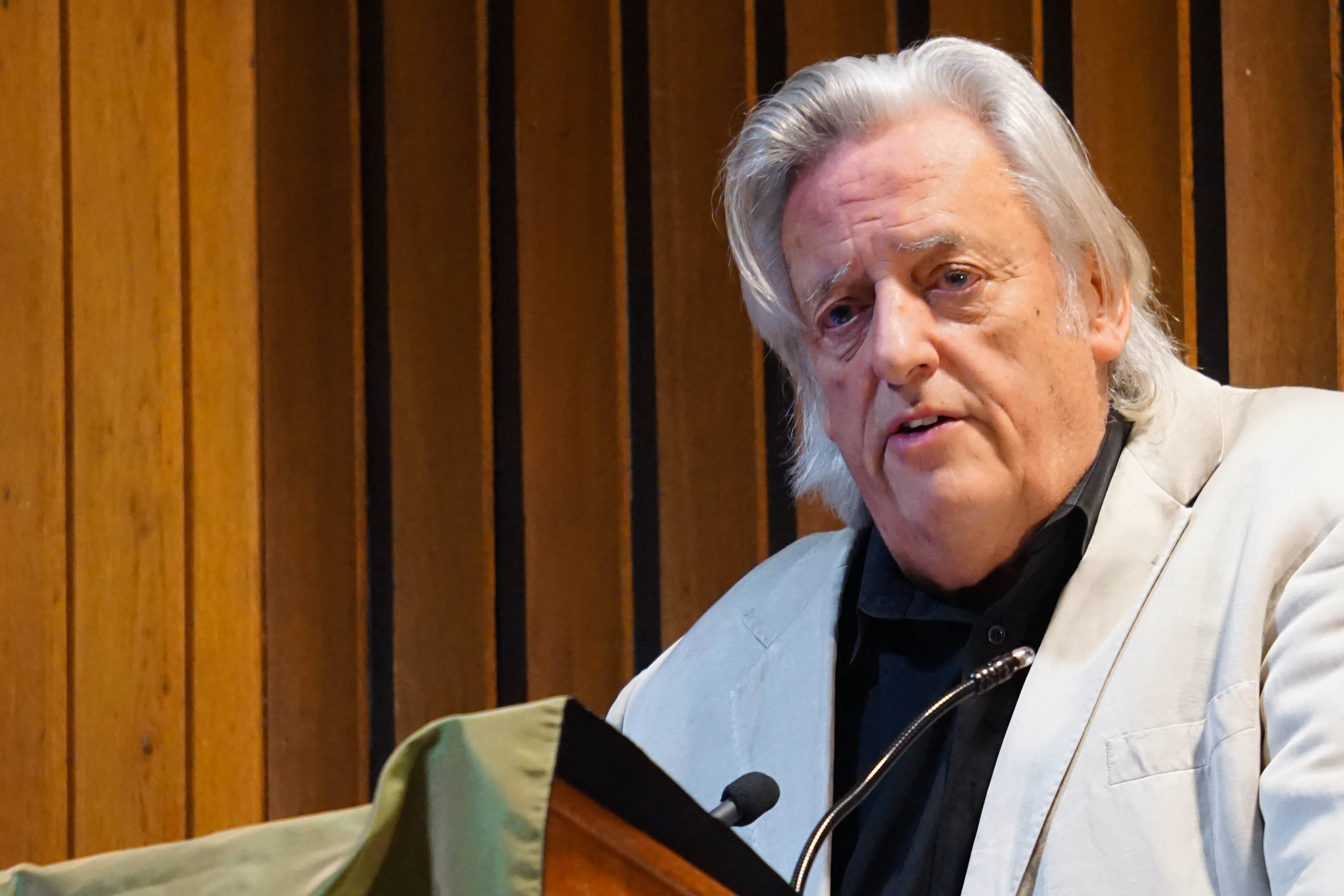
Michael Mansfield QC, who represented other miscarriage of justice victims such as Barry George and Eddie Browning, agreed to defend Hall and attempted to get him freed

Hall refused to acknowledge his guilt and his legal team attempted to discredit the fibre evidence against him. In 2007 his case was promoted by Rough Justice. His case was also taken up by the University of Bristol Innocence Project (UoBIP), and they helped his case get referred to the Court of Appeal of England and Wales in 2009 via the Criminal Cases Review Commission.

Hall's wife Stephanie, who he had married in prison in 2005, was convinced of his claims of innocence, saying: "There was never a shadow of a doubt that they had the wrong guy, he didn't have it in him – he's too sensitive and kind." For many years she ran a campaign called "Justice 4 Simon" in an attempt to free him from prison, and Hall regularly sent online messages to his supporters. Friends and family of Hall also backed him, setting up a website to highlight what they believed were the weaknesses in the prosecution case against him, and wrongly claiming that he had no motive for killing Albert, a friend of his mother's. His campaign also won the backing of a number of MPs, and his case also featured in the book No Smoke: The Shocking Truth about British Justice by Sandra Lean. Lawyer Michael Mansfield agreed to represent him legally and lead his campaign to be freed.

== Appeal ==
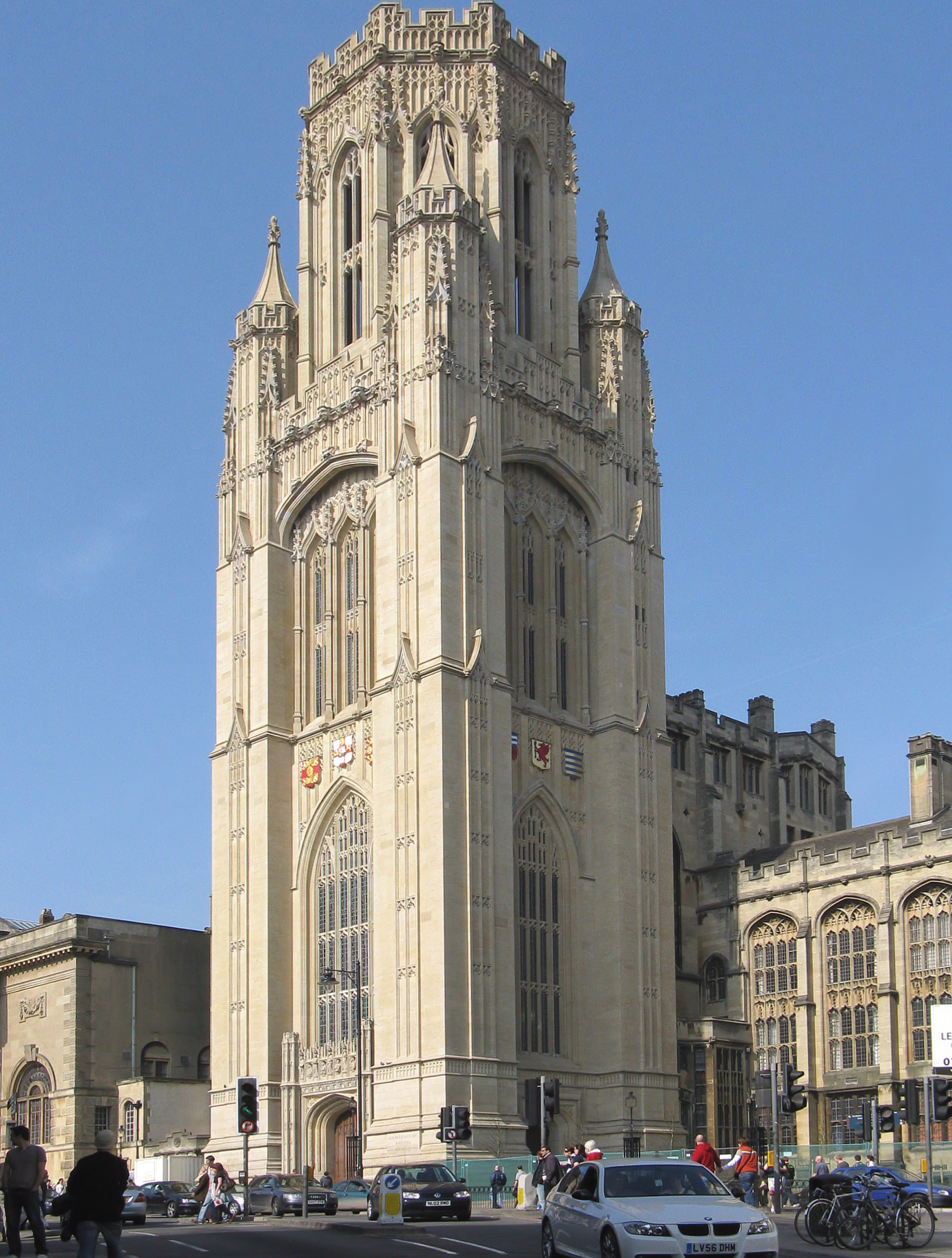
The University of Bristol's Innocence Project group helped promote Hall's claims of innocence, even after his appeal was rejected in 2011.

In 2011 the Court of Appeal upheld his conviction, concluding that the conviction was correct and saying: "The scientific support for the assertion that the appellant was the source of the fibres found at the crime scene is compelling. We have no reason to doubt the safety of the jury's verdict and the appeal is dismissed." Even after this appeal was rejected the Bristol Innocence Project continued to promote his claims of innocence, complaining that the Court of Appeal had not taken his claims of innocence "seriously" and saying that they didn't seek "the truth of whether alleged victims of wrongful convictions are innocent or not". However, by this time Hall had already confessed to the crime to his wife Stephanie, revealing details including his motive for the crime. Despite this, Stephanie Hall continued to protest his innocence to national prisoners' newspaper Inside Time.

== Confession ==
In 2013, following the rejection of his appeal, Hall formally admitted his guilt to prison authorities after ten years of claiming his innocence, leading to outrage in the national media. The Telegraph reported that his trial and appeal had cost the taxpayer between £400,000 and £500,000. Thousands of hours of legal research had been wasted on attempting to clear Hall's name, including many hours of work conducted by unpaid volunteers of the University of Bristol Innocence Project. In January earlier in the year the CCRC had also been examining a new claim by Hall that he was carrying out a burglary elsewhere on the day Albert's body was found, but Hall dropped this appeal after he finally admitted his guilt. Campaigner Ray Hollingsworth, who had claimed that he had gathered evidence that showed two other people were responsible for the murder, said: "If I'm wrong about this, I'm wrong. I will hold my hands up. I'm not going to hide from anyone. I believed in his innocence".

Retired detective Roy Lambert, who led the original inquiry, said in response to the confession: "I've always been satisfied that he was responsible for killing Joan. Lots and lots of people were supporting him, MPs were supporting him and now he's deceived all of them because all along he's known that he's done it". Suffolk Police released a statement saying: "Over the 10 years since Hall's conviction there have been a number of appeals and campaigns which have asserted that Simon Hall was wrongfully convicted of Mrs Albert's murder. These events and the related uncertainty have undoubtedly exacerbated the suffering Mrs Albert's family have had to endure since Joan was murdered. We sincerely hope that Simon Hall's admissions to having committed this brutal crime will in some way enable the family to move on with their lives." The family of victim Joan Albert, who had had to endure years of claims that Hall was innocent, released a statement saying: "During the last 10 years the publicity surrounding the appeals has been very distressing for our family, making moving on impossible, but we would like to thank Suffolk Police, including Roy Lambert and his team, who carried out the original investigation, to present day officers who continue to support us. We are also grateful to those who have helped us throughout this difficult ordeal".

== Suicide ==
One year after he finally confessed, Hall was found unresponsive in his cell at HM Prison Wayland in Norfolk, and was later pronounced dead, having committed suicide by hanging. Stephanie Hall accepted that she had wrongly believed in his innocence.

== Impact ==
The Hall case was described as an embarrassment to miscarriage of justice activists and an example of a case that they "quietly bury" as they do not wish to appear to have wrongly defended a guilty person. The New Statesman said that the Hall case had "gravely undermined the claims of many of the genuinely innocent".

== See also ==
- James Hanratty – British murderer who was the subject of a 'miscarriage of justice' campaign led by Bob Woffinden, but later proven to be guilty
