= Malkinson =

Malkinson is a surname. Notable people with the surname include:

- Andrew Malkinson (born 1966), British man wrongfully convicted of rape
- Brian Malkinson (born 1985), politician in Alberta, Canada
