= Perminov =

Perminov (Russian: Пе́рминов), female form Perminova (Russian: Пе́рминова), is a Russian surname.

== Notable people ==
Notable people having this surname include:

- Aleksei Yuryevich Perminov (born 1968), Russian footballer
- Anatoly Perminov (born 1945), Russian rocket scientist
- Dmitry Perminov (born 1979), Russian soldier and politician
- Sergey Perminov (born 1968), Russian politician
- Yelena Perminova (born 1960), Russian politician
