= Serhiy Tkach =

Soviet-Ukrainian serial killer

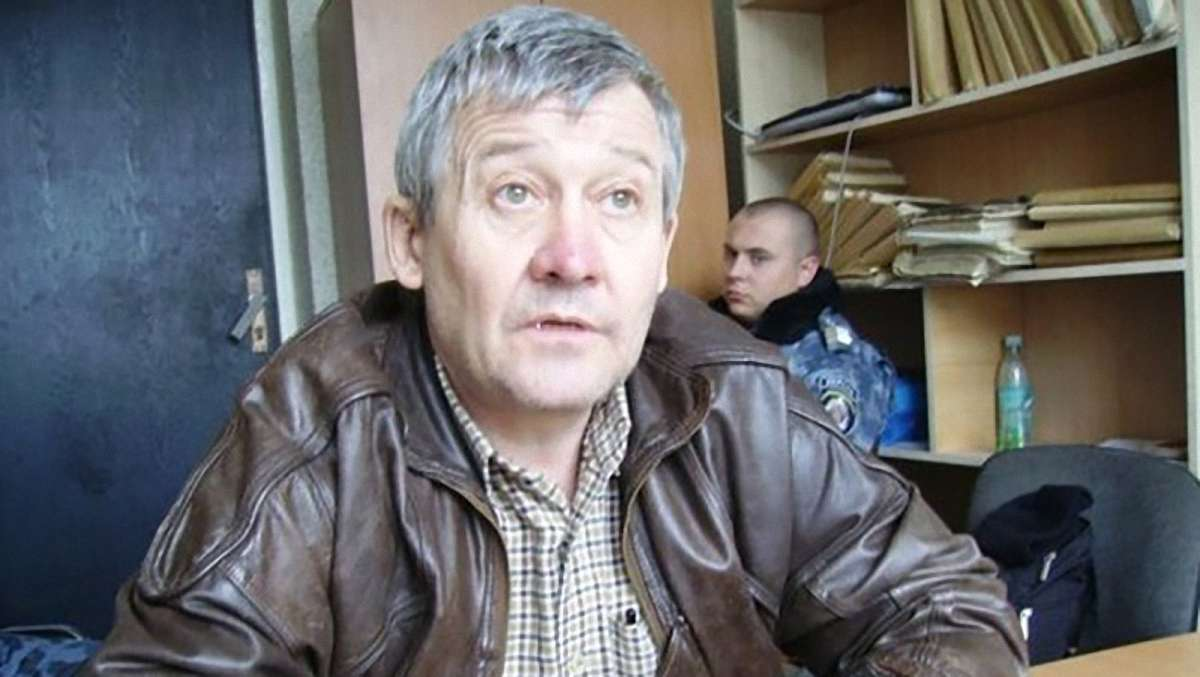
- Born: Serhiy Fedorovych Tkach; 15 September 1952; Kiselyovsk, Kemerovo Oblast, Russian SFSR, Soviet Union
- Died: 4 November 2018 (aged 66); Prison No. 8, Zhytomyr, Zhytomyr Oblast, Ukraine
- Other names: Pavlohrad Maniac; Polohy Maniac
- Penalty: Life imprisonment

Details
- Victims: 37 confirmed, 100+ claimed
- Span of crimes: 1980–2005
- Country: Soviet Union; Ukraine
- Date apprehended: 30 August 2005

Serhiy Fedorovych Tkach (Ukrainian: Сергій Федорович Ткач, Russian: Серге́й Фёдорович Ткач; 15 September 1952 – 4 November 2018), also known as Sergey Tkach, was a Russian-born Ukrainian police officer and serial killer who was convicted for the killings of thirty-seven women and girls in the Soviet Union and later Ukraine between 1980 and 2005.

== Background ==
Serhiy Tkach was born on 15 September 1952, in Kiselyovsk, Kemerovo Oblast, Russian SFSR, Soviet Union. He served in the Soviet Army, and according to neighbours claimed to have been a veteran of the Soviet-Afghan War. Tkach worked as a police investigator in Kemerovo Oblast, where he was recommended for admission to a Ministry of Internal Affairs school until he was caught falsifying evidence and forced to resign. Afterwards, Tkach worked numerous different jobs before moving to the Ukrainian SSR in 1982, where he began working again as a police investigator in Dnipropetrovsk Oblast.

== Murders ==
In 1984, schoolgirls and young women began to noticeably disappear across Dnipropetrovsk Oblast, Kharkiv Oblast, Zaporizhzhia Oblast and Crimea in eastern Ukraine, near where Tkach lived and worked. He targeted female victims, aged between 8 and 18, who were raped, suffocated, and sexually defiled after their deaths. Tkach used his knowledge of criminal investigation procedure to mislead other policemen investigating his killings, such as choosing victims near railway lines recently treated with tar to throw police dogs off his scent.

== Arrest, conviction, and imprisonment ==
In August 2005, Tkach attended the funeral of one of his victims. Children also in attendance claimed to have seen him with the victim shortly before her death. He was arrested at his home in Polohy and admitted to his crimes, claiming to have killed over 100 people until his arrest, and demanded the death penalty. In 2008, after a yearlong trial, Tkach was sentenced to life imprisonment for the murder of thirty-seven women and girls over more than two decades.

Over the years, fifteen men had been wrongly jailed for some of the murders of which Tkach was found guilty, one of whom committed suicide, and another who was not released until March 2012.

A 2018 Netflix documentary titled Inside the World's Toughest Prisons revealed that Tkach fathered a child while in prison with a woman in her twenties who became infatuated with him after reading an interview in the media. She went on to marry Tkach in 2015, who was allowed conjugal visits according to human rights provisions.

== Death ==
Tkach died in Prison No.8 of Zhytomyr, Zhytomyr Oblast, where he was serving his sentence, on 4 November 2018. The cause of death was heart failure. Tkach was buried on 7 November by prison staff, as none of his relatives claimed the body.

== See also ==
- List of serial killers by country
- List of serial killers by number of victims
