= Paul Connolly (journalist) =

Irish journalist

Paul Dermot Connolly
- Born: 29 September 1983 (age 42); Dublin, Ireland
- Occupation: Journalist
- Writing career
- Notable work: Documentary series: Paul Connolly Investigates

Paul Dermot Connolly is an Irish investigative journalist, radio personality, and documentary maker, who worked for the Irish commercial television station TV3. He worked as a host for various famous Irish sports shows and also is the host of a series of investigative documentaries self-titled as Paul Connolly Investigates.

== Career ==
Born in Dublin, Connolly studied Journalism and Media Communications at Griffith College Dublin, gaining a degree in that subject. He began his career as editor of "The Bike Buyers Guide", before moving into radio where he worked at Ireland's Newstalk 106-108. He was a regular on-air contributor to Moncrieff, before establishing himself as a sports reporter. He has appeared on both Off The Ball and The Weekend Sports Show, and was a host of 98FM's current affairs programme The Inbox for three years.

On television, Connolly has appeared on Setanta Sports, providing coverage of the Pro14 both as a presenter and reporter, and first joined TV3 as host of The All Ireland County Quiz. His documentary series, Paul Connolly Investigates is aired on TV3 and has looked at a diverse range of topics, including benefit fraud, bogus marriages, and the subcultures of swinging and dogging in Ireland. In 2015 he started hosting Undercover Benefits Cheat on Channel 5.

In 2016, Connolly hosted Season 1 of the documentary series Inside the World's Toughest Prisons, which aired on Channel 5. As part of the documentary, he spent a few days in prisons in Honduras, Poland, Mexico, and the Philippines.
