= Ernest Barrie =

British man convicted of culpable homicide

- Born: 1955 (age 70–71)
- Known for: Killing a person after having previous robbery conviction quashed with help from the Rough Justice programme
- Criminal charges: Robbery (conviction quashed on appeal), subsequently culpable homicide (pleaded guilty)
- Criminal penalty: 1986 robbery conviction quashed on appeal after serving three years, sentenced to nine years imprisonment for culpable homicide
- Criminal status: Conviction for robbery quashed by Court of Appeal in 1989, since served sentence for culpable homicide and released

Ernest Barrie (born 1955) is a Scottish killer who killed a man after having previously had his conviction for robbery quashed with help from the Rough Justice programme, which investigated supposed miscarriages of justice. Convicted of robbing a branch of the Clydesdale Bank in Blantyre in 1986, his conviction was quashed on appeal in 1989 after expert analysis of the CCTV concluded that the robber was not Barrie. Subsequently, in July 2007, he attacked and killed his 38-year-old neighbour Alan Hughes in his flat in Gorbals, Glasgow, inflicting 47 injuries upon him in a 15-minute long attack. He pleaded guilty to culpable homicide in 2009.

== Biography ==
Barrie was convicted of robbing a branch of the Clydesdale Bank in Blantyre, Lanarkshire, of £40,000 in 1986 and sentenced to 18 years' imprisonment. He was released on interim license in 1989 after serving three years. An investigation by Rough Justice had previously found that the robber caught on CCTV was not Barrie, as his facial features and height differed from the perpetrator's. Barrie appealed his case based on this evidence, and his conviction was overturned by an appeal court on 10 March 1989, with Lord Advocate Baron Fraser telling the justices that the Crown was no longer seeking to support the conviction. The 1987 episode of Rough Justice which featured his case was titled "Evidence in Camera".

In 1998 his son Ernest fell into the River Clyde 300 yards (274 metres) from the family home and died. The Rough Justice team sent him flowers and a card.

In July 2007 Barrie beat his neighbour to death at his flat at 305 Caledonia Road, Gorbals, Glasgow, with his downstairs neighbour calling the police after hearing the violent attack take place over 15 minutes. When they arrived they found the man in a pool of blood and although he was then still alive he bled to death. Barrie had inflicted 47 separate injuries with a knife, a toilet cistern lid, a walking stick and a metal pole during the prolonged attack. Barrie was charged with murder but pleaded guilty to the reduced charge of culpable homicide, and psychiatrists agreed that he was suffering from a psychotic illness. Sentencing, the judge said: "This is a very serious crime and a lengthy custodial sentence is the only possible sentence. I also have to make sure the public is protected from you after you are released". He was sentenced to nine years' imprisonment and was also ordered to be supervised for three years after his release from prison.
