= M25 Three =

1988 crime involving the beating and stabbing

M25 Three case
- Map of south London and north Surrey showing Chelsham (1), Oxted (2), Fetcham (3), Sydenham (4) and the M25 motorway (blue).
- Date: 16 December 1988
- Arrests: 12
- Accused: 3
- Convicted: 3
- Charges: Murder; Aggravated Robbery
- Verdict: Guilty
- Convictions: Three life imprisonment, without the possibility of parole After the trial was ruled unfair, these three convictions were vacated, and all charges against the men were withdrawn.

The M25 Three were Raphael Rowe, Michael George Davis, and Randolph Egbert Johnson, who were jailed for life at the Old Bailey in March 1990 after being wrongfully convicted of murder and burglary. The name was taken from the location of the crimes, which were committed around the M25, London's orbital motorway, during the early hours of 16 December 1988. The original trial took place between January and February 1990, resulting in all three being convicted of the murder of Peter Hurburgh, causing grievous bodily harm with intent to Timothy Napier and several robberies. Each was sentenced to life imprisonment for the murder and given substantial sentences for the other offences. The convictions were overturned in July 2000. All three men have consistently maintained their innocence.

== The M25 crime spree ==
At some time between 11 pm and 12:30 am, an armed gang of three men wearing balaclavas and driving a stolen green Triumph Spitfire approached a car in Chelsham, Surrey in which Peter Hurburgh and Alan Eley were having sex. The gang dragged the two men from the car, tied them up and stripped and beat them. Eley stated that one of the gang was armed with a knife, and another was holding a handgun. The gang then poured petrol over the two men, and Eley lost consciousness. When he regained consciousness, Hurburgh was dead, having sustained five fractured ribs and a fractured sternum, which had bruised his heart leading to death from cardiac arrest.

The assailants abandoned the Triumph Spitfire at the scene in Chelsham and stole Hurburgh's car, an Austin Princess which they then drove around the M25 to Oxted, Surrey. Here, at around 3:40 am, they broke into a home belonging to Richard Napier, then aged 66, who lived with his wife and 40-year-old son. The gang threatened the family with a knife and two handguns, one of which was described as a revolver. Timothy Napier sustained multiple knife wounds and Mrs Napier was instructed to remove her rings and jewellery. She was told that if she refused her fingers would be cut off. The house was ransacked and after 20–30 minutes, the robbers left, taking Timothy Napier's Toyota Corolla which had been parked near the house. Peter Hurburgh's Austin Princess was found abandoned 100 yards from the Napiers' house.

The gang then drove around the M25 to Fetcham, Surrey, where at 5 am, they broke into the house of Rosemary Spicer and her boyfriend Peter Almond, who were threatened with a handgun, tied up and gagged while the house was ransacked. After between forty-five minutes and an hour the gang left in a Renault 5 and a Vauxhall Cavalier stolen from Spicer and Almond; Timothy Napier's Toyota was later found nearby.

== Arrests ==
Rowe and Davis were arrested on the morning of 19 December 1988 at the probation hostel they shared in Sydenham, London and initially taken to Oxted Police Station. Johnson was apprehended on 6 January 1989, at which time he was found to be in possession of a revolver. Some of the items stolen during the Oxted and Fetcham robberies were recovered from the bail hostel. Davis' fingerprints were found on porcelain figures (unconnected) in a cupboard where property taken during one of the robberies was found. Also arrested were Shane Griffin, Jason Cooper and Mark Jobbins. In total, twelve people at the hostel were arrested. A further suspect, Norman Duncan, was already in police custody.

== Case against Rowe, Davis and Johnson ==
Griffin and Duncan admitted stealing the Triumph Spitfire used by the gang that murdered Hurburgh, but testified that they had stolen it at the request of Rowe, on 13 December 1988. They claimed that it had been kept at the bail hostel until the evening of 15 December when Rowe, Davis and a third man, whom they did not know but who was alleged by the prosecution to be Johnson, had asked them for assistance to "bump start" the vehicle, between 23:00 and 00:00. They also testified that Rowe had asked for balaclavas. This same group of witnesses claimed that Rowe and Davis had returned on the morning of 16 December in the stolen Renault and Vauxhall Cavalier with a quantity of items, the proceeds of the robberies, which they helped to unload and hide. They alleged that they were then asked to dispose of the stolen vehicles, with the warning that they were a "bit warm" and that they would have to be burned completely to remove all identification.

A girlfriend of Rowe, Kate Williamson, said that at the time the crimes were committed Rowe had left at approximately 01:30 and not returned until around 06:30, when he returned wearing different jeans and shoes and carrying a Sainsbury's bag, the same type of which had been taken in the Spicer/Almond robberies. Williamson claimed that Rowe took from the bag a pendant with a gold chain, a watch which was later found to be one taken during the Spicer robbery, and muddied jeans and boots. Williamson claimed that Rowe gave her two rings, later found to have been taken during the Napier robbery, a watch found to have been taken from the Spicer robbery, and a watchstrap from the Napier robbery. She handed all of the items to the police on 19 December 1988. Police also found a brooch taken in the Spicer robbery in a bin in Rowe's room. Williamson gave further evidence that when Rowe had left on the Thursday evening he had been wearing a particular type of distinctive footwear, and imprints made by this type of boot were found in a flowerbed at the Napier home and in blood in the Napier's hall.

== Weaknesses in the prosecution case ==
A witness for the defence testified that he had seen the green Triumph Spitfire, in the location where it was eventually found, at approximately 00:30 on 16 December. Given Williamson's testimony that Rowe had still been at the bail hostel at this time, this placed Rowe away from the scene and therefore the subsequent crime spree. The judge at the original trial drew this to the jury's attention in his summing up, and also highlighted that the evidence of Jobbins, Duncan and Griffin came from men who essentially were accomplices, and Williamson was by her own admission a handler of stolen goods.

There were also serious discrepancies between the appearance of the three defendants and the descriptions given by witnesses. All three defendants were black men, but Alan Eley had initially told the police he thought that only one of the assailants was black, the other two being white men, although all three had worn balaclavas throughout the attack. Both Richard Napier and his wife also said that they thought that at least one attacker was white, a view repeated by Rosemary Spicer. However, in both of the robberies, as with the attack on Eley and Hurburgh, none of the men had removed their balaclavas. Part of the prosecution case relied upon a conversation Johnson was alleged to have had with a fellow prisoner, in which he admitted guilt and described one of his accomplices as a "redskin". The prosecution pointed out that in his police interviews, Johnson also used the expression "redskin", a Jamaican term to describe someone with lightly coloured skin, and that Rowe was lightly coloured.

There was no physical evidence linking Johnson to any of the scenes of crime or to any property stolen from them.

The trial judge, Lord Justice Auld, summed up over four days and at the 2000 ruling it was acknowledged that the summation was "a careful, fair and wholly accurate reflection of the evidence and the issues. His directions in law were impeccable. He drew attention to the weaknesses in the prosecution case as well as its strengths. Having directed the jury as to the burden and standard of proof he said: "That test is particularly important in a case such as this when so much of the evidence is disputed, where much of the prosecution evidence is itself tainted for one reason or another and where there is considerable uncertainty and inconsistency in important areas.""

=== Other inconsistencies ===
Rowe has since stated that it had been pointed out that the three key prosecution witnesses:

- fit the victims' descriptions of the assailants
- admitted handling and hiding some of the stolen property in premises belonging to Jobbins' girlfriend
- admitted stealing the Spitfire
- admitted possessing a handgun used by the gang
- admitted disposing of the stolen Vauxhall and Renault

Until the arrest of Rowe and Davis, the police maintained in their appeals for information that the suspects were two white males and one black male.

== Appeal ==
Following conviction the defendants appealed. The grounds for appeal were based on

- that Johnson had not been identified by anyone including Jobbins, Duncan or Griffin;
- the evidence from eyewitnesses about the race of the attackers;
- the unreliability of the witness who testified that Johnson had confessed to him while on remand;
- the unreliability of Jobbins, Duncan and Griffin;
- the inconsistency between Kate Williamson's evidence and that of the witness who had seen the green Spitfire at the scene of the murder.

The appeal was heard on 23 July 1993, and it was then disclosed that reward money had been paid for information leading to the three men's conviction but not the name or names of the recipients, which their lawyers claimed was vital to their case, since those alleged to have received payments might also have been suspects, and had been promised immunity from prosecution in return for information. It later emerged that Norman Duncan had received £10,300 in reward money from the Daily Mail, which was not disclosed to the jury when he gave evidence at the original trial.

The appeal was rejected, with the court stating: "Taking all the evidence relating to the timing and events on the Thursday night and the succeeding days into account we conclude that, on the whole of the material we have reviewed, there is no basis for saying there is even a lurking doubt about the safety of the convictions of Rowe and Davis, the same applies to Johnson. On the contrary, the case against them all was, and remains, a formidable one."

In 1994, Davis and Rowe made an application to the European Court of Human Rights.

== Criminal Cases Review Commission ==
In 1997 the Criminal Cases Review Commission appointed an investigating officer from Greater Manchester Police to carry out enquiries into the case, and in January 1999 the investigating officer submitted his report. This disclosed that:

- Investigating officers had discussed the possibility of a reward being paid to him at the conclusion of the case
- No prosecutions were carried out against Duncan, Griffin, Cooper or Jobbins
- Cooper was himself a known burglar with a previous conviction for robbery
- The foreman of the jury had visited the site of the murder without the knowledge of the court
- There was no evidence to link Johnson to any of the scenes of crime or to any property stolen from them
- Witness testimony suggested that at least one of the gang was white
- There existed a possibility of the persons responsible for the attack upon Hurburgh and Eley having returned to the bail hostel in the Austin Princess before the same vehicle set off for the Napier's residence with a different team inside

The report concluded that: "The new evidence and arguments... create a real possibility that Mr Johnson was not one of those three persons. Whilst there is evidence specifically linking Messrs Rowe and Davis to the robberies, if the prosecution against one of the three, Mr Johnson, might no longer be sustainable, in the Commission's view the Court of Appeal ought at the same time have the opportunity to consider whether the case can still be sustained against Messrs Rowe and Davis."

== ECHR judgment and release ==
On 16 February 2000 the European Court of Human Rights returned its judgment in respect of Davis and Rowe. It found that there had been a violation of Article 6 (1) of the European Convention on Human Rights, specifically the failure to disclose Duncan's status as an informant prior to trial together with the fact that he had become eligible for a reward and may have nominated Cooper as one of the robbers before later accusing Johnson.

=== Release ===
The hearing commenced on 14 June 2000 and their convictions were overturned after being ruled "unsafe" by the Court of Appeal. On 17 July 2000 the three were released from prison. Lord Justice Mantell, Mr Justice Blofeld and Mrs Justice Rafferty were emphatic that although the convictions were unsafe, they were not declaring the men innocent: "The case against all three appellants was formidable. The evidence against Rowe was overwhelming... For the better understanding of those who have listened to this judgment and of those who may report it hereafter this is not a finding of innocence, far from it." On his release, Davis stated that it had been "a very long and hard battle to prove my innocence", and that they were "innocent" regardless of what the judges had said. Rowe said: "I know the judges were involved in a damage limitation exercise. But what they said was diabolical. They didn't say I was guilty, but that's how everyone interpreted it. I have battled every day of the last 12 years to prove I was set up by the police, to prove I am not a murderer. It has been my passion. I am free now, but it's as if I'm still inside. I'm still trying to get my voice heard."

Rowe is currently an investigative journalist working for the BBC. His documentary on the conviction of Barry George for the murder of Jill Dando was considered a significant factor in his eventual acquittal.

== See also ==
- List of miscarriage of justice cases
