= Rough Justice (British TV programme) =

- Created by: Peter Hill; Martin Young
- Presented by: Martin Young (1982–86); David Jessel (1987–92); John Ware (1993–97); Kirsty Wark (1998–2007)
- Country of origin: United Kingdom

Production
- Producers: Peter Hill (1980–86); Steve Haywood (1987–92); Charles Hunter; Dinah Lord

Original release
- Network: BBC One/BBC Two
- Release: 1982 – 2007

Rough Justice is a British television programme that was broadcast on BBC, and which investigated alleged miscarriages of justice. It was broadcast between 1982 and 2007 and played a role in overturning the convictions of 18 people involved in 13 separate cases where miscarriages of justice had occurred. The programme was similar in aim and approach to The Court of Last Resort, the NBC programme that aired in the United States from 1957–58. It is credited with contributing to the establishment of the Criminal Cases Review Commission in 1997.

Rough Justice was cancelled in 2007 due to budget restraints, leading to criticism from the media.

== Origins ==
The programme was devised and produced by Peter Hill, an investigative journalist, in 1979, motivated by Ludovic Kennedy's earlier television work in the same field and the work of Tom Sargant at reform group JUSTICE. In 1992 Hill recalled: "At that time there were equally important programmes being made by John Willis at Yorkshire Television and Ray Fitzwater at Granada. We were all investigating mistakes made before a case comes to trial. That was the problem in the early eighties – the legacy of police misconduct from the seventies."

During this period, criminal justice procedure in the United Kingdom was uncodified. Until the introduction of the Police and Criminal Evidence Act 1984 (PACE), and the creation of the Crown Prosecution Service in 1986, the police "decided what evidence to disclose." Following the introduction of PACE, David Jessel, a later reporter on the programme, acknowledged that the Act had "probably reduced police misconduct" but said that "the evidence of a plethora of post-PACE case papers is that the same old wickednesses continue, although in different guises. It is remarkable how many suspects these days "confess" in police cars on their way to PACE-protected police stations; and duty solicitors have tales to tell about the co-operation afforded them at some stations."

== Format ==
Each programme concentrated on a separate case where a miscarriage of justice was alleged to have taken place. The first, titled The Case of the Handful of Hair, was broadcast on BBC1 on 7 April 1982, and concerned a 1976 murder case. It was watched by 11 million viewers.

In 1992, the original team took the format to Channel 4, under the title Trial and Error - this ran until 2000. However, Rough Justice continued with new personnel.

== Cancellation ==
The programme was cancelled by the BBC in November 2007 as a cost-cutting measure. Marcel Berlins, writing in The Guardian, pointed out that the "effort and care which went into the programme's investigations" frequently "uncovered basic flaws in our system of investigating crime, exposed police incompetence and revealed the shortcomings of forensic science." It was this effort, Berlins believed, and the high financial cost that it entailed, that led to the BBC decision that "the crass value-for-money criterion was not being fulfilled. Yet Rough Justice is a perfect example of what public service broadcasting, which the BBC is supposed to espouse, is all about."

Simon Ford, who had worked as the programme's executive producer, said: "For 27 years (sic), a programme like Rough Justice has proved that television, as well as reporting on injustice, can actually change things. Without a dedicated team doing that, many individuals who are wrongly imprisoned will stay there and the British public will remain ignorant of the failings of our justice system. This is a tragedy for the prisoners themselves and our greater society." The BBC was also criticised for cancelling the programme while spending £18 million to launch a Gaelic-language channel "aimed at only 86,000, mainly Scottish, viewers, a population the size of Crawley, [West Sussex]."

== Programmes ==
- 1982
  - The Case of the Handful of Hair (first broadcast 7 April 1982) – reinvestigation of the conviction of Mervyn "Jock" Russell for the murder of Jane Bigwood in Deptford, London, in 1976.
  - The Case of the Thin-bladed Knife (first broadcast 14 April 1982) – reinvestigation of the conviction of father and son Michael and Patrick McDonagh for the murder of Francis McDonagh in Moss Side, Manchester.
  - The Case of Little Boy Blue (21 April 1982) – reinvestigation of the 1973 conviction of John Walters for sexual assaulting Roselyne Auffret on a train travelling from Wimbledon station to London Waterloo station. Originally sentenced to four years imprisonment for the offence, Walters' insistence of his innocence throughout his sentence led to his being labelled delusional and he was transferred to Broadmoor high-security psychiatric hospital where he was still being detained at the time of broadcast.
- 1983
  - Rough Justice Report (first broadcast 19 October 1983) – follow-up and progress reports relating to the previous programmes and previewing the second season.
  - The Case of the Tortured Teenager (first broadcast 26 October 1983) – reinvestigation of the conviction of Margaret Livesey for the murder of her fourteen-year-old son Alan Livesey in Bamber Bridge, near Preston.
  - The Case of the Confused Chemicals (first broadcast 2 November 1983) – reinvestigation of the conviction of Ernie Clarke for the murder of Eileen McDougall, whose body was found nine years after her death in a petroleum storage tank at South Shields, Tyne and Wear.
  - The Case of the Missing Meal (first broadcast 9 November 1983) – reinvestigation of the conviction of George Beattie for the murder of Margaret McLaughlin at Carluke, South Lanarkshire.
- 1984
  - Verdict Unsafe (first broadcast 22 March 1984) – documentary following the life of Mervyn Russell after his release from prison, his conviction for murder having been quashed as a result of The Case of the Handful of Hair.
- 1985
  - Rough Justice Report (first broadcast 12 September 1985) – follow-up and progress reports relating to the previous programmes and previewing the third season.
  - The Case of the False Fish (first broadcast 19 September 1985) – reinvestigation of the conviction of Anthony Steel for the murder of Carol Wilkinson at Ravenscliffe, Bradford.
  - The Case of the Tell-tale Tape (first broadcast 26 September 1985) – reinvestigation of the conviction of Alf Fox for the murder of his wife and mother-in-law.
  - The Case of the Perfect Proof (first broadcast 3 October 1985) – reinvestigation of the conviction of Anthony Mycock for aggravated burglary. The victim later said that the crime had not taken place and that it was a figment of her imagination.
- 1987
  - Rough Justice Report (first broadcast 1 September 1987) – follow-up and progress reports relating to the previous programmes and previewing the fourth season.
  - A Confession to the Impossible (first broadcast 7 September 1987) – reinvestigation of the conviction of Bill Funnell for the murder of his wife Anne Funnell
  - When Lightning Strikes Thrice (first broadcast 30 September 1987) – reinvestigation of the conviction of Stephen Spencer for armed robbery at Liverpool in 1984.
  - Evidence in Camera (first broadcast 17 December 1987) – reinvestigation of the conviction of Ernest Barrie for armed robbery at the Clydesdale Bank in Blantyre, South Lanarkshire, in 1986. With help from this Rough Justice programme he was subsequently released on appeal, but in 2007 he brutally attacked and killed his neighbour and pled guilty to the killing, with psychiatrists agreeing that he had a psychotic illness.
- 1989
  - A Convenient Conviction (first broadcast 25 January 1989) – reinvestigation of the convictions of brothers Paul and Wayne Darvell for the murder of sex shop manageress Sandra Phillips in Swansea, Wales, in 1985.
  - Rough Justice Report (first broadcast 12 March 1989) – follow up to Evidence in Camera detailing the subsequent acquittal and release of Ernest Barrie.
- 1990
  - Suspect Premises (first broadcast 4 April 1990) – reinvestigation of the conviction of Ghanaian Sammy Davis for the rape of a Swedish tourist in London in November 1986.
- 1991
  - An Inquiry Under Question (first broadcast 28 March 1991) – update of the Stephen Spencer case first highlighted in When Lightning Strikes Thrice, which had led to Douglas Hurd, the Home Secretary, ordering a review of the case. This follow-up programme produced evidence suggesting that the review was conducted improperly plus further fresh evidence that Spencer could not have committed the crime.
  - Who Was that Masked Man? (first broadcast 4 April 1991) – reinvestigation of the conviction of Robert Campbell for armed robbery at Glasgow in 1989.
  - Murder or Mystery? The Curious Case of Baby Glen (first broadcast 5 November 1991) – reinvestigation of the conviction of Jacqueline Fletcher for the murder of her 6-week-old son Glen. Fletcher had been convicted at Birmingham Crown Court in 1988 of drowning Glen, whose death had previously been considered a case of sudden infant death syndrome. Fletcher was not arrested until three years after Glen's death.
- 1992
  - The Bordon Baseball Bat Murder (first broadcast 21 May 1992) – reinvestigation of the conviction of Sam Hill for murder of Malcolm Barker at Bordon, East Hampshire, in 1987, a crime which another man had confessed to.
- 1993
  - Murder in Mind (first broadcast 1 April 1993) – reinvestigation of the conviction of Patrick Kane for aiding and abetting the murders of David Howes and Derek Wood at Casement Park, Belfast in 1988.
  - Word for Word (first broadcast 14 July 1993) – reinvestigation of the conviction of Ransford Nedrick for the murder of 12-year-old Lloyd Hume following an act of arson in Wolverhampton, West Midlands, in 1984.
- 1994
  - Code of Silence (first broadcast 26 January 1994) – reinvestigation of the conviction of John "Mex" Megson, a member of the "Druids" motorcycle club, for the murder of Stephen Rowley at Scarborough Mere, North Yorkshire, in 1989.
  - True Confessions (first broadcast 2 June 1994) – follow up to The Bordon Baseball Bat Murder. Sam Hill's conviction had gone to appeal and was turned down despite David Smith's public confession to the murder.
  - The Biker's Tale (first broadcast 25 August 1994) – follow up to Code of Silence, relating Megson's successful appeal, retrial and subsequent release in May 1994.
- 1995
  - Death in the Playground (first broadcast 3 May 1995) -– reinvestigation of the conviction of Paul Esslemont for the manslaughter of 3-year-old Carl Kennedy at Coventry, West Midlands, in 1993. After serving four years of an eight-year sentence, Esslemont was freed in 1997 when his conviction was declared unsafe.
- 1996
  - The Usual Suspect (first broadcast 12 March 1996) – reinvestigation of the conviction of Paul Berry for armed robbery.
  - Who Killed Carl Bridgewater? (first broadcast 10 April 1996) – reinvestigation of the convictions of Patrick Molloy, Jim Robinson, Michael Hickey and Vincent Hickey (the Bridgewater Four) for the murder of 13-year-old Carl Bridgewater at Stourbridge, West Midlands, in 1978.
  - The Vet's Wife (first broadcast 26 November 1996) – reinvestigation of the conviction Ryan James for the murder of his wife Sandra James at Burton-upon-Trent, Staffordshire, in 1995.
- 1997
  - Murder at the Studio (first broadcast 1 April 1997) – reinvestigation of the conviction of Stephen Craven for the murder of Penny Laing at the Studio Nightclub, Newcastle upon Tyne in 1990.
  - Judgement Day (first broadcast 30 July 1997) – an unscheduled follow up to Who Killed Carl Bridgewater? transmitted on the day that the Bridgewater Four won their appeal and were released.
- 1998
  - Murder on the M25 (first broadcast 25 March 1998) – reinvestigation of the convictions of Raphael Rowe, Michael Davis, and Randolph Johnson (the "M25 Three") for the murder of Peter Hurburgh at Chelsham, Surrey, in December 1988.
  - The Jigsaw Murder (first broadcast 2 June 1998) – a reinvestigation of the 1977 convictions of Reg Dudley and Bob Maynard for the murders of Micky Cornwall and Billy Moseley. Lasting 135 days, it had been the longest murder trial in British history.
- 1999
  - The Price of Friendship (first broadcast 2 June 1999) – reinvestigation of the conviction of Martin O'Halloran for the murder of Thomas Walker of Polesworth, in Bentley, North Warwickshire in 1975.
  - Ruth Ellis: A Life for a Life (first broadcast 28 November 1999) – reinvestigation and reconstruction of the trial and conviction of Ruth Ellis revealing evidence which was ignored by the authorities and which might have saved her.
- 2002
  - If the Cap Fits (first broadcast 6 January 2002) – reinvestigation of the conviction of Oliver Campbell for the murder of Baldee Hoondle during a robbery in London in July 1990.
- 2004
  - Death on Camera (first broadcast 14 April 2004) – reinvestigation of the circumstances of the death of former British Army paratrooper Christopher Alder in police custody at Queen's Gardens police station, Kingston upon Hull, in 1998. Alder was left on the floor of the station for 11 minutes and choked to death on his own blood and vomit while police officers stood around him speculating that he was faking illness.
  - Earmarked (first broadcast 29 September 2004) – Mark Dallagher was convicted in 1998 of the murder of 94-year-old Dorothy Wood, based primarily on controversial earprint evidence found at the scene. The programme follows Dallagher's appeal of his conviction, which was ultimately quashed.
- 2005
  - Murder Without A Trace (first broadcast 24 March 2005) – reinvestigation of the convictions of Barri White and Keith Hyatt. White was convicted of murder and Hyatt of perverting the course of justice after Rachel Manning's body was found at Woburn Golf and Country Club, Milton Keynes, in December 2000. Both had their convictions quashed in 2007. On 4 September 2013 Shahidul Ahmed was found guilty of the murder of Rachel more than a decade after her boyfriend was wrongly jailed for the crime. Ahmed's DNA was found on a steering lock used to disfigure her face after death, and in a hair recovered from her hotpants. Ahmed was convicted of a sex attack in Bletchley in 2011 when his DNA was identified. He was sentenced to life with a minimum term of 17 years.
- 2007
  - The Innocents' Brief (first broadcast 12 April 2007) – reinvestigation of the conviction of Simon Hall for the murder of 79-year-old Joan Albert in Capel St. Mary, Suffolk, December 2001. On 8 August 2013 the BBC reported that Simon Hall had confessed his crime to prison authorities.

== Retrial by TV: The Rise and Fall of Rough Justice ==
As part of the BBC Four Justice Season focusing on the state of justice in Britain, a programme called Retrial by TV: The Rise and Fall of Rough Justice aired on 3 April 2011 and examined the creation of the programme, its relationship with the charity JUSTICE, and its troubled relations with the UK judiciary (as characterised by criticisms by law lords Denning and Lane), the police, the Home Office and the governors of the BBC.
