= A Test of Character =

- Porridge episode
- Episode no.: Season 3 Episode 5
- Directed by: Sydney Lotterby
- Written by: Dick Clement and Ian La Frenais
- Original air date: 18 March 1977

Episode chronology
← Previous "Pardon Me"	Next → "Final Stretch"

"A Test of Character" is the fifth episode from the third series of the BBC sitcom Porridge which aired on 18 March 1977. In the episode, Godber is studying for his O Level History exam but does not approve of Fletcher's method of cheating. Meanwhile, Fletcher and Warren are having a dispute on the Solar System.

== Synopsis ==
Godber is trying to study for his History O-Level, but Fletcher keeps talking. A heated argument between the two attracts the attention of Mr Mackay, who naturally demands to know what is going on. Mackay criticises Fletcher for being an "ageing recidivist", while praising Godber for being willing to study. Mackay also makes it clear that Fletcher is not to disturb Godber. Soon after, Warren arrives and engages in a debate with Fletcher over the Solar System. Fed up with the constant interruptions, Godber storms out in a huff.

To help Godber, Fletcher accompanied by Warren and McClaren visit the study hall, where Mr. Barrowclough is helping violent inmate Spraggon with a creative writing course. Fletcher and McLaren distract Barrowclough with a demonstration of the Solar System, using different sized balls (and Barrowclough's apples) to represent the planets. At first, Spraggon refuses to betray Barrowclough, but relents when Warren offers him tobacco. Spraggon tells Warren where the keys are, allowing him to steal the exam paper.

Back at the cell, Godber appreciates the gesture, but turns them down as he feels he has cheated most of his life and wants to pass the exam honestly. Fletcher and Warren are annoyed at Godber because of the risk they took to help him. Fletcher points out to Godber that in the real world, there are very few breaks. For instance, a person with no convictions would always beat Godber in job interviews regardless of qualifications. Realising that Godber is not listening, Fletcher leaves him to it. Once Fletcher has left, Godber has a discreet glance at the exam paper, unaware that Warren is spying on him.

The following day, Godber has taken his exam and tells Fletcher and Warren that he is proud that he did it without cheating. At this, Fletcher tells Godber he does not stand for hypocrisy and he knows about Warren seeing Godber looking at the exam paper. Godber asks who stole the exam paper, to which Warren replies that it was him. It turns out that due to Warren's dyslexia, he took the biology paper instead of the history paper. The episode ends with a freeze frame of Fletcher grabbing Warren by the lapels.
