= Wrongful conviction of Andrew Malkinson =

British man who served 17 years' imprisonment for a wrongful rape conviction

Andrew Malkinson (born 23 January 1966) is a British man who was wrongfully convicted and jailed in 2004 for the rape of a 33-year-old woman in Salford, Greater Manchester. He was released from prison in 2020 after serving 17 years, still maintaining his innocence, and his conviction was finally quashed by the Court of Appeal in 2023 after DNA evidence proved he was not the attacker. The true perpetrator, Paul Quinn, was later identified by DNA testing and was convicted in April 2026.

== Incident ==
The victim, a 33-year-old woman, was attacked in the early hours of 19 July 2003 while walking home in Little Hulton. She was dragged down a motorway embankment and strangled until unconscious. In the attack she sustained significant injuries to her neck, back, legs, arms, chest and face, including a fractured cheekbone. After losing consciousness she was raped.

== Conviction ==
Malkinson was identified by the victim in an identity parade. Several key details did not match the description of the perpetrator: for example, she described the attacker as being three inches (7.5 cm) shorter than Malkinson, with a hairless chest, and no tattoos. Malkinson had chest hair and prominent tattoos on his forearms. She also said the attacker would have a "deep scratch" to his face, which Malkinson did not. During the trial of Paul Quinn, it was revealed that the victim later told the police that she was not sure if Malkinson was her attacker after seeing him in court but had been encouraged to testify against him anyway because the police were certain it was him.

There was no DNA evidence linking him to the crime at the time. At trial, he was presented as a drifter and was found guilty of two counts of rape and attempting to choke, suffocate or strangle with intent to commit rape but found not guilty of attempted murder after a jury at Manchester Crown Court (Crown Square) spent nine hours considering their verdicts. He was convicted by a 10–2 majority jury verdict and sentenced to life imprisonment with a minimum term of 6½ years.

== Imprisonment ==
Malkinson appealed against his conviction in 2006, and applied to the Criminal Cases Review Commission (CCRC) for review in 2009 and, assisted by the charity Appeal, in 2018; all were denied. The CCRC was warned in 2013 about the potential for exculpating DNA evidence after a review of a separate case with a similar fact pattern to Malkinson's, the wrongful imprisonment of Victor Nealon, but this was not acted upon.

Before he was exonerated, a chief constable of Greater Manchester Police had suspended the force's misconduct investigation into the case. Re-testing of cold case samples in 2007 revealed another man's DNA in a sample taken from the victim, with the Crown Prosecution Service (CPS) aware of this by December 2009. At the time, there was no match in the National DNA Database for this other man. The CPS advised against further examination, and the CCRC also declined to review Malkinson's case on cost–benefit grounds, despite the exculpatory evidence. Malkinson could have been released after 6½ years but was not because he maintained his innocence. He was released in 2020 for good behaviour.

== Conviction quashed ==
Malkinson made another application to the CCRC in 2021, and, in 2022, a man named Paul Quinn was arrested in connection with the original crime after DNA testing found a link between him and the previously unknown sample. His DNA had not been in the national database in 2009 despite a 1993 conviction for raping a 12-year-old girl because the database had not been established yet when he was convicted, but was added in 2012 as part of a nationwide operation to collect the DNA of all convicted sex offenders. The CCRC referred the case for appeal, and the conviction was quashed by the Court of Appeal in July 2023, using evidence from the 2007 re-testing of samples, which identified a man who had subsequently been placed in the National DNA Database.

Malkinson also asked why wrongfully convicted prisoners should be charged jail living costs, which is deducted from any compensation received. After it emerged that Malkinson may have money deducted from his compensation to pay for his prison living costs, senior Conservative MP Sir Bob Neill urged the UK government to change the rule, stating that "Any fair-minded person thinks this is just wrong." Agreeing that the situation was unfair, a spokeswoman for Rishi Sunak, UK Prime Minister at the time, subsequently said Sunak had "been speaking with the Home Office and with others in government to establish the facts and ensure that the approach is right and fair".

On 6 August, Secretary of State for Justice Alex Chalk confirmed that he was scrapping the rule, describing it as a "common sense change which will ensure victims do not face paying twice for crimes they did not commit". Chalk subsequently announced that he was looking at other cases of wrongful conviction with a view to backdating the rules. In 2024 the government announced that past wrongful conviction cases would not be able to claim compensation from the rule change.

== Reaction ==
Upon his name being cleared, Malkinson stated that he felt he was "forcibly kidnapped ... by the state". Greater Manchester Police apologised although this apology was not accepted by Malkinson, who called it "meaningless". The Independent Office for Police Conduct opened a review into the GMP's handling of Malkinson's complaints. Edward Garnier, a former Solicitor General, called for a public inquiry and criticised the justice system's handling of the case and particularly the conduct of the CCRC, saying that the decision to reject Malkinson's 2009 appeal on cost–benefit grounds despite the lead of the unknown man's DNA had, in fact, led to significant costs both to Malkinson and to the state in compensation to be paid; further, he suggested that exemplary damages may be due "because of the oppressive and arbitrary behaviour of agents of the state". Former Director of Public Prosecutions Ken Macdonald and KC Michael Mansfield also called for an inquiry.

The Criminal Cases Review Commission announced on 17 August 2023 that it had appointed an external KC to review into its handling of the case. On 24 August, the Justice Secretary, Alex Chalk, announced the launch of a non-statutory inquiry to investigate the role of the Crown Prosecution Service, Greater Manchester Police and the Criminal Cases Review Commission. On 13 September 2023, the Independent Office for Police Conduct announced it would investigate Greater Manchester Police's handling of the Malkinson case. In July 2024, Justice Secretary Shabana Mahmood announced that she was seeking the removal of CCRC chairwoman Helen Pitcher over her handling of the Malkinson case. Malkinson praised the decision, calling Pitcher "utterly unfit to lead the CCRC". Pitcher resigned from her post on 14 January 2025 before she could be sacked. The chief executive of the CCRC, Karen Kneller, resigned later that year after she was accused of trying to "sanitise" an independent report on Malkinson's conviction.

The Independent Office for Police Conduct opened an investigation into the conduct of Greater Manchester Police during the Malkinson investigation.

== Aftermath ==
After release from prison, Malkinson lived in a tent in Spain. He spent nineteen months after his release living off universal credit before eventually receiving a compensation payment from the Ministry of Justice in February 2025. The case was featured in the academic journal Medicine, Science, and the Law in 2021, and is the subject of a dedicated podcast. The case was also the subject of the BBC Two documentary The Wrong Man: 17 Years Behind Bars, which aired on 6 June 2024.

== Trial and conviction of Paul Quinn ==
Paul Quinn, who had been identified as the rapist by DNA testing, was brought to trial for the rape in March 2026. The court heard that saliva on the victim's vest was one billion times more likely to belong to Quinn than to anyone else. Testing in 2023 had also found a partial match between Quinn's DNA and semen samples from the speculum used to examine the victim. In addition, Quinn's ex-wife Catherine testified that he had left home on the night of the attack wearing a white shirt with a horizontal blue stripe, similar to the shirt worn by the rapist, and had returned later that night without it on. She also said that Quinn often wore his shirt unbuttoned and had a shaved chest at the time, as did the rapist. The trial also heard that Quinn had searched online for information about Malkinson's campaign to prove his innocence in 2019, before it was widely known, and had searched "how long is DNA kept in database" after it was first reported that another man's DNA had been found.

Quinn was found guilty of rape, grievous bodily harm and intentional strangulation on 17 April 2026. On 5 June 2026, Quinn was sentenced to 24 years in prison.

== Inquiry ==
An inquiry into the wrongful conviction, led by judge Sarah Munro, began on 26 October 2023. The hearing was to examine the original investigation by Greater Manchester Police and why it took so long for the conviction to be overturned. Munro said before it began that she would be "fearless" in seeking the truth.

The inquiry was delayed during the trial of Paul Quinn. Following the conviction and sentencing in of Paul Quinn in June 2026, the inquiry was able to "recommence its work".

== See also ==
- List of miscarriage of justice cases
- Wrongful conviction of Victor Nealon
