= Inside the World's Toughest Prisons =

- Genre: Documentary
- Presented by: Paul Connolly (season 1), Raphael Rowe (season 2–present)
- Country of origin: United Kingdom
- Original languages: English (presenter), local languages of countries whose prison systems were visited (Spanish, Portuguese, German, Greek, Norwegian, Ukrainian, Russian, Romanian, Polish, Filipino, Tok Pisin, Greenlandic, Sabela, Mauritian Creole, Afrikaans, Finnish, Indonesian, Czech)
- No. of seasons: 7
- No. of episodes: 27

Production
- Executive producers: Emma Read (Emporium); Gabe Solomon (Emporium); Olivia LaRoche for season 2 onward (commissioned the show for Netflix)

Original release
- Network: Channel 5 (season 1); Netflix (season 2–7)
- Release: April 12, 2016 – September 15, 2023

Inside the World's Toughest Prisons is a television documentary series produced by London-based Emporium Productions and available on Netflix. The documentary shows life in various prisons around the world, mostly from the prisoner perspective but also including the perspective of prison guards and others interacting with the prison system. Season 1 was hosted by Irish journalist Paul Connolly and originally aired on Channel 5. Since the second season, the series has been commissioned by Netflix and hosted by UK journalist Raphael Rowe, who had himself served 12 years in prison for a crime he did not commit. The series's seventh and final season was released on 15 September 2023.

== Episodes ==
Season	Episodes	Originally released		
Season	Episodes	First released	Last released	Network
1	4	April 12, 2016	May 4, 2016	Channel 5 & Netflix
2	4	July 6, 2018		Netflix
3	4	December 14, 2018		Netflix
4	4	July 29, 2020		Netflix
5	3	January 9, 2021		Netflix
6	4	September 28, 2022		Netflix
7	4	September 15, 2023		Netflix

=== Season 1 (2016) ===
Season 1, hosted by Paul Connolly, was aired in 2016 on Channel 5 in the United Kingdom. It is now available on Netflix along with Seasons 2 to 7.

No. overall	No. in season	Title	Original release date
1	1	"Honduras"	April 20, 2016
Connolly spends a week inside Danli prison in Honduras. Distinguishing features of the prison: the toughest inmates are armed and act as enforcers for the overwhelmed guards.
2	2	"Poland"	April 27, 2016
Connolly spends time in Poland's Piotrków prison. Distinguishing features of the prison: prisoners have to stay in their cells 23 hours a day, and the prison experience is quite claustrophobic.
3	3	"Mexico"	March 3, 2016
Connolly spends time in Mexico's El Hongo prison.
4	4	"Philippines"	May 4, 2016
Connolly spends time in two prisons in the Philippines. Distinguishing features of the prison: overcrowding, gangs, and intimidation are a way of life.

=== Season 2 (2018) ===
Season 2, produced by Netflix with host Raphael Rowe, was released on July 6, 2018 on Netflix.

No. overall	No. in season	Title	Original release date
5	1	"Brazil: The Gang Prison"	July 6, 2018
Rowe spends a few days as both a guard and as a prisoner in Brazil's Porto Velho penitentiary. Distinguishing features of the prison: constant tensions and risk of violence and riots between Brazil's two leading drug gangs, the Primeiro Comando da Capital (PCC) and Comando Vermelho (Red Command), due to which the prison guards attempt to segregate the prison based on gang affiliations.
6	2	"Ukraine: The Prison in a War Zone"	July 6, 2018
Rowe spends time in Ukraine's Zhytomyr prison. Distinguishing features of the prison: a skeleton crew that allows prisoners to freely roam around the grounds, often with potentially dangerous weapons.
7	3	"Papua New Guinea: The Breakout Prison"	July 6, 2018
Rowe visits the short-staffed Bomana Prison in Papua New Guinea. Distinguishing features of the prison: near-constant food shortages that keep the facility on the brink of chaos.
8	4	"Belize: The Prison that Found God"	July 6, 2018
Rowe spends time in Belize Central Prison in Belize. Distinguishing features of the prison: an approach to rehabilitation based on evangelism (God).

=== Season 3 (2018) ===
Season 3, produced by Netflix with host Raphael Rowe, was released on December 14, 2018 on Netflix.

No. overall	No. in season	Title	Original release date
9	1	"Costa Rica: Prison on a Knife-Edge"	December 14, 2018
Rowe spends time in Costa Rica's La Reforma Prison, including a visit to the maximum-security part and time spent in the medium-security and low-security parts. Distinguishing features of the prison: the medium-security part of the prison is quite overcrowded and depressing, but the low-security part of the prison feels much more welcoming.
10	2	"Colombia: Narco Prison"	December 14, 2018
Rowe spends time in the fortress-like prison in Bogotá, Colombia. Distinguishing features of the prison: claustrophobic conditions and problems of drug use in the prison despite a lot of monitoring and searching by the authorities.
11	3	"Romania: Gypsy Prison"	December 14, 2018
Rowe spends a week in a maximum security prison in Craiova, Romania. Distinguishing features of the prison: very little outdoor space, so prisoners are kept locked in their cells most of the day. Also, the Romani people make up over half the prison population, significantly overrepresented relative to their share of the overall Romania population.
12	4	"Norway: The Perfect Prison?"	December 14, 2018
Rowe spends time in Halden Prison in Norway, a maximum-security prison. Distinguishing features of the prison: Halden is experimenting with a radically new prison structure based on the principle of normality: try to make prison life closely approximate life outside prison, so as to rehabilitate prisoners and prepare them for successful reentry into society.

=== Season 4 (2020) ===
Season 4, produced by Netflix with host Raphael Rowe, was released on July 29, 2020 on Netflix.

No. overall	No. in season	Title	Original release date
13	1	"Paraguay: The Most Dangerous Prison on Earth"	July 29, 2020
Raphael Rowe spends a week behind bars at Tacumbú prison in Paraguay, where inmates scrounge in the trash in order to pay their own way.
14	2	"Germany: The Therapy Prison"	July 29, 2020
Schwalmstadt, a 12th-century fortress surrounded by a moat, houses some of Germany's worst offenders, many of whom attend intense therapy sessions.
15	3	"Mauritius: The Extreme Punishment Prison"	July 29, 2020
The tropical island of Mauritius is home to Melrose maximum security prison, where even the smallest infraction is met with extreme punishment.
16	4	"Lesotho: Confronting Sexual Violence"	July 29, 2020
An unnerved Rowe contends with aggressive cellmates at Maseru prison, where a high number of inmates are behind bars for rape.

=== Season 5 (2021) ===
Season 5, produced by Netflix with host Raphael Rowe, was released on January 9, 2021 on Netflix.

No. overall	No. in season	Title	Original release date
17	1	"South Africa: The Number Gangs Prison"	January 9, 2021
At Brandvlei Correctional Centre in South Africa, nearly all the convicts belong to dangerous gangs known for lethal stabbings.
18	2	"Philippines: The War on Drugs Prison"	January 9, 2021
Once again, Raphael Rowe volunteers to go behind bars, this time in the Philippines at Manila City Jail, one of the world's most overcrowded prisons.
19	3	"Greenland: Prison in the Ice"	January 9, 2021
Greenland's Nuuk maximum security prison houses extremely dangerous men, many of whom grew up alongside the guards now watching over them.

=== Season 6 (2022) ===
Season 6, produced by Netflix with host Raphael Rowe, was released on September 28, 2022 on Netflix.

No. overall	No. in season	Title	Original release date
20	1	"Moldova: The Lifers Prison"	September 28, 2022
At Penitentiary 17 in Moldova, nearly 100 of the convicts are life sentence inmates.
21	2	"Cyprus: The Utopian Prison"	September 28, 2022
Once again, Raphael Rowe volunteers to go behind bars, this time in Cyprus at the Central Jail of Nicosia.
22	3	"Bosnia: The Mafia Prison"	September 28, 2022
In Bosnia and Herzegovina, Rowe volunteers to go inside Zenica prison.
23	4	"Greece: The People Smugglers Prison"	September 28, 2022
This time, overcrowding is the main focus inside a prison in Greece housing many of the worst offenders in the prison system.

=== Season 7 (2023) ===
Season 7, produced by Netflix with host Raphael Rowe, was released on September 15, 2023 on Netflix.

No. overall	No. in season	Title	Original release date
24	1	"Finland: The Free Choice Prison"	September 15, 2023
25	2	"Czech Republic: The Crystal Meth Prison"	September 15, 2023
26	3	"Indonesia: The re-programming drug prison"	September 15, 2023
27	4	"Solomon Islands: God’s Own Prison"	September 15, 2023
