= Helen Pitcher =

British lawyer (born 1958)

Helen Pitcher OBE (born March 1958) is a British businesswoman, who served as chair of the Criminal Cases Review Commission from 2018 to 2025, and chair of the Judicial Appointments Commission from 2023 to 2026. Pitcher chaired the Queen's Counsel Selection Panel from 2009 to 2017. She was also appointed a Director of Advanced Boardroom Excellence Limited in 2013. Pitcher was first appointed as chair of the Criminal Cases Review Commission in September 2018, beginning a three-year term in the post from 1 November. She was then reappointed for a further five-year term in 2021. In November 2022, she was appointed as chair of the Judicial Appointments Committee, taking up the role on 1 January 2023. She was due to serve a three-year term that would have ended on 31 December 2025.

On 14 January 2025, she announced that she was resigning from the post of chair of the Criminal Cases Review Commission following criticism from the UK government regarding her tenure in charge of the commission, and moves to have her removed from the post.

She was appointed an OBE in the 2015 Birthday Honours for her services to business.
