= Brandvlei Correctional Centre =

Prison in South Africa

- Interactive map of Brandvlei Correctional Centre
- Location: Worcester, Cape Winelands District Municipality, Western Cape, South Africa; 33°45′20″S 19°24′35″E
- Status: Operational
- Security class: Maximum and medium security
- Managed by: Department of Correctional Services

Brandvlei Correctional Centre (formerly Brandvlei Prison) is a prison situated on the bank of the Brandvlei Dam near Worcester, Western Cape, South Africa. It contains a maximum-security unit, a medium-security unit, and a juvenile unit. The facility also houses members of the notorious The Numbers Gang or numbers gangs. In 2021, it was featured in a Netflix series, Inside the World's Toughest Prisons.

According to the Census of 2001, the population of the prison (including prisoners and resident staff) was 3,020.
