= Pardon Me (Porridge) =

- Porridge episode
- Episode no.: Season 3 Episode 4
- Directed by: Sydney Lotterby
- Written by: Dick Clement and Ian La Frenais
- Original air date: 11 March 1977

Episode chronology
← Previous "Rough Justice"	Next → "A Test of Character"

"Pardon Me" is an episode of the BBC sitcom Porridge. It originally aired on 11 March 1977. In the episode, elderly prisoner Blanco Webb is due to be paroled, but he does not accept it, as he would be admitting his guilt. Fletcher and the rest of Slade Prison petition to the Home Office for Blanco to be pardoned.

== Synopsis ==
The episode opens during recreation hour where Fletcher is playing Monopoly with elderly inmate Blanco Webb. Mr Barrowclough tells them to finish the game as it is locking up time in five minutes. Lukewarm, Blanco's cellmate, scolds Blanco as he promised to make sure he has a clean shirt for his parole hearing the next day. Godber wonders why Blanco was not paroled years ago. Fletcher comments that it is because Blanco has always protested his innocence, whereas the parole board would prefer him to be "guilty but ashamed".

That night, Godber asks Fletcher what Blanco was convicted of. Fletcher explains that Blanco murdered his wife and hid her body in the freezer. Godber is horrified and cannot believe it because Blanco seems like a nice old man.

The next day, Blanco has been granted parole. At first, they reminisce about 1959, the year Blanco was imprisoned. Fletcher remembers that he sold a stolen car that year, and Godber remembers he was in junior school. Blanco, however, bitterly remembers 1959 for the year he was incarcerated for something he did not do and refuses to accept his parole.

Fletcher meets Blanco on his allotment and scolds him for his stubborn attitude. Blanco believes that Fletcher is after his rhubarb and strawberries, but Fletcher promises to look after the allotment if Blanco is freed. Blanco remembers the time he grew grapes but was forced to pack it in after making wine.

On Saturday afternoon, Fletcher, Godber, Warren and Lukewarm start the Campaign for the Release of Old Webb (CROW). They ask Mr Barrowclough to sign the petition, but he refuses, so Fletcher forges Barrowclough's signature.

Later, the petitioners are brought before the Governor, who disapproves of prisoners' petition groups. Barrowclough states that they have the right to, under the Penal Code. Fletcher warns the Governor that the feeling is so strong, it could cause trouble for the prison officers, especially as Blanco has threatened to go on hunger strike in protest. Mr Mackay believes Blanco to be a "stubborn old fool" for refusing parole. The Governor believes it has been too long for a retrial to take place. Fletcher says that the campaign could make the Governor a celebrity, but Mackay puts an end to the meeting and orders the prisoners out. The Governor shudders at the thought of an elderly man like Blanco going on hunger strike.

Barrowclough suggest to the Governor that an alternative to a retrial is for Blanco to receive a pardon from the Home Office. The Governor readily agrees but discovers that Barrowclough has signed the petition. Barrowclough passes this off as a forgery, but admits it is his signature, making him look foolish in front of Mackay and the Governor.

Blanco has been finally pardoned by the Home Office. Before he leaves Slade Prison, Blanco bids farewell to his former inmates. Fletcher warns him not to seek revenge on his wife's lover, the true culprit. Blanco says that the lover died years ago, as it was Blanco who killed him.
