= Kiselyovsk =

Town in Kemerovo Oblast, Russia

Kiselyovsk Киселёвск
- Town
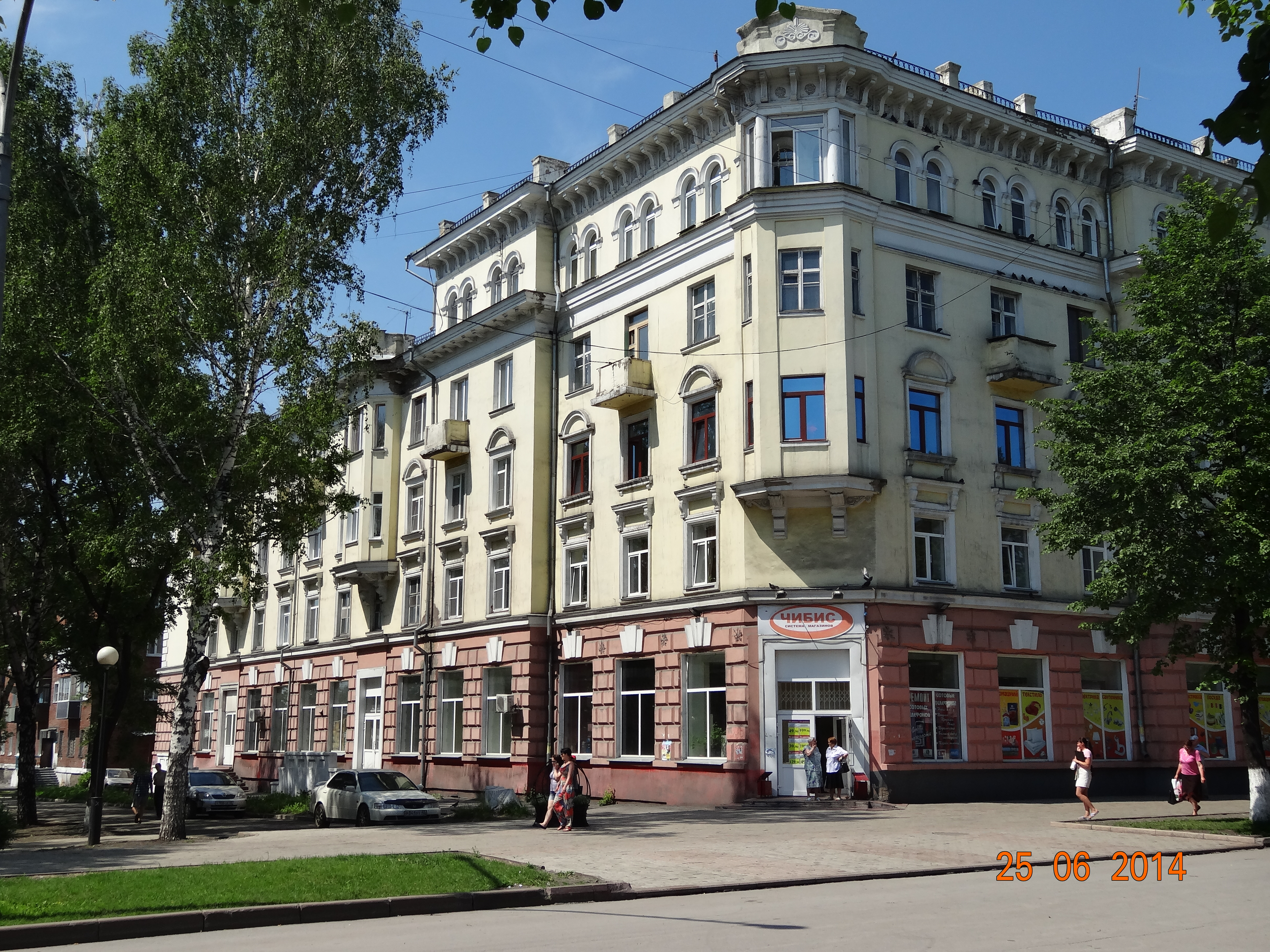
- Former department store, Kiselyovsk

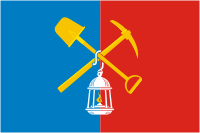
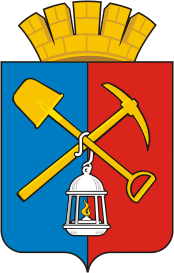
- Flag Coat of arms
- Interactive map of Kiselyovsk
- Location of Kiselyovsk Kiselyovsk (Kemerovo Oblast)
- Coordinates: 54°00′N 86°39′E
- Country: Russia
- Federal subject: Kemerovo Oblast
- Founded: 1917
- Town status since: 1936
- Elevation: 320 m (1,050 ft)

Population (2010 Census)
  - Total: 98,365
  - Estimate (2025): 80,115 (−18.6%)
  - Rank: 171st in 2010

Administrative status
  - Subordinated to: Kiselyovsk Town Under Oblast Jurisdiction
  - Capital of: Kiselyovsk Town Under Oblast Jurisdiction

Municipal status
  - Urban okrug: Kiselyovsky Urban Okrug
  - Capital of: Kiselyovsky Urban Okrug
- Time zone: UTC+7 (MSK+4)
- Postal code: 652700—652799
- Dialing code: +7 38464
- OKTMO ID: 32716000001

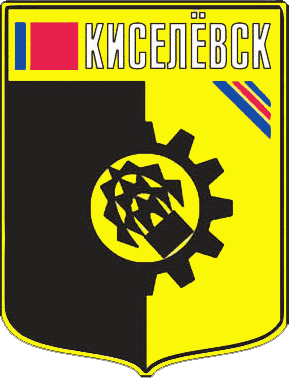
Soviet coat of arms of Kiselyovsk

Kiselyovsk (Russian: Киселёвск) is a town in Kemerovo Oblast, Russia, located in the foothill belt of the Salair Ridge, at the source of the Aba River, 193 kilometers (120 mi) south of Kemerovo. Population: 98,365 (2010 census); 106,341 (2002 census); 128,083 (1989 Soviet census).

The Kuzbass region, where Kiselyovsk is located, supplies 60% of Russia's coal, and the town suffers from heavy pollution due to the dominance of the coal mining and processing industries. The coal ash leads to a phenomenon known as "black snow". Another danger is spontaneous combustion of discarded coal.

== Administrative and municipal status ==
Within the framework of administrative divisions, it is, together with five rural localities, incorporated as Kiselyovsk Town Under Oblast Jurisdiction—an administrative unit with the status equal to that of the districts. As a municipal divisions, Kiselyovsk Town Under Oblast Jurisdiction is incorporated as Kiselyovsky Urban Okrug.

== History ==
Residents of the town and Russian rights groups have campaigned for several years for the Russia government to move the city away from the immediate outskirts of the mine due to the extreme levels of pollution. In September 2019, a number of the town's residents lobbied the Canadian government to grant them status as environmental refugees.

== Notable people ==
- Vadim Bakatin (1937–2022), politician
- Bohdan Bandura (born 1960), football midfielder
- Sergey Dolmatov (born 1959), chess grandmaster
- Aleksei Perminov (born 1968), footballer
- Mikhail Shivlyakov (born 1980), strongman
- Serhiy Tkach (1952–2018), serial killer
- Stepan Kiselev (born 1986), marathon runner
