= Aleksei Perminov =

Russian footballer

Personal information
- Full name: Aleksei Yuryevich Perminov
- Date of birth: 17 May 1968 (age 58)
- Place of birth: Kiselyovsk, Russian SFSR
- Height: 1.85 m (6 ft 1 in)
- Position: Defender

Youth career
- Spartak Kiselyovsk

Senior career*
Years	Team	Apps	(Gls)
1986–1988	FC Tom Tomsk	70	(0)
1989	FC Kuzbass Kemerovo	40	(0)
1990–1992	FC Uralmash Yekaterinburg	80	(4)
1992–1993	FC Rotor Volgograd	11	(1)
1994–1997	FC Baltika Kaliningrad	104	(4)
1998–2001	FC Tom Tomsk	106	(3)
- * Club domestic league appearances and goals

Aleksei Yuryevich Perminov (Russian: Алексей Юрьевич Перминов; born 17 May 1968) is a former Russian professional footballer.

== Club career ==
He made his professional debut in the Soviet Second League in 1986 for FC Manometr Tomsk.
