= Kiselevsky (rural locality) =

Name of several Russian rural localities

Kiselevsky (Russian: Киселевский; masculine), Kiselevskaya (Киселевская; feminine), or Kiselevskoye (Киселевское; neuter) is the name of several rural localities in Arkhangelsk Oblast, Russia:

- Kiselevskaya, Kargopolsky District, Arkhangelsk Oblast, a village in Pechnikovsky Selsoviet of Kargopolsky District
- Kiselevskaya, Shenkursky District, Arkhangelsk Oblast, a village in Verkhopadengsky Selsoviet of Shenkursky District
