= Barry George =

British man wrongly convicted of murder (born 1960)

- Born: Barry Michael George; 15 April 1960 (age 66); London, England
- Other names: Paul Gadd; Thomas Palmer; Steve Majors; Barry Bulsara
- Known for: Wrongful conviction for murder of television presenter Jill Dando
- Criminal charges: Police impersonation: 1980; Indecent assault: 1981 x 2, 1988, 1990, 1992; Attempted rape: 1983; Assault: 1989; Murder: 2000
- Criminal penalty: 1980: Fine; 1981: 3 months imprisonment; 1983: 33 months imprisonment; 2001: Life imprisonment
- Criminal status: Murder conviction quashed by Court of Appeal on 15 November 2007
- Spouse: Itsuko Toide (m. 1989; div. 1990)

Barry Michael George (born 15 April 1960) is an English man who was found guilty of the murder of English television presenter Jill Dando and whose conviction was overturned on appeal.

Dando's profile and popularity ensured high public interest in the case. When no motive could be found and no evidence emerged from criminals or British intelligence of a contract or conspiracy to kill Dando, police began to reassess evidence that had been set aside at the start of the inquiry. The circumstantial evidence was a single particle of firearm discharge residue—a speck that matched the ammunition used in the killing.

George was convicted of murder but the forensic evidence was later discounted and his conviction was judged unsafe by the Court of Appeal and quashed in 2007. After a retrial, he was acquitted on 1 August 2008. His claims for compensation for wrongful imprisonment have been dismissed, on the grounds that a reasonable first trial had occurred, with the successful appeal having been on legitimate technical issues rather than due to an overt "miscarriage of justice".

== Early life ==
Barry George was on born on 15 April 1960, in Hammersmith Hospital, London. He is the youngest of three children.

At 14, George attended the publicly funded Heathermount boarding school in Sunningdale, Berkshire, for children with emotional and behavioural difficulties. After leaving school without qualifications, his only employment was as a messenger at BBC Television Centre on a fixed term contract for six months; the job lasted only five months.

== Previous criminal convictions and investigations ==
George has been likened to a "lone obsessive, Walter Mitty-type figure" for his desire to impersonate famous figures. George adopted several pseudonyms, starting at school, where he used the name Paul Gadd, the real name of singer Gary Glitter. In March 1980, after George failed in his attempt to join the Metropolitan Police, he was arrested and charged for impersonating a police officer, having obtained false warrant cards. In May 1980, he appeared in court clad in glam rock clothing and untruthfully stated his name to be Paul Gadd. At Kingston Magistrates' Court he was convicted and fined £25. In the early 1980s he appeared in a local newspaper claiming to be the winner of the British Karate Championship; he was exposed as a fraud by another newspaper.

In 1980, George joined the Territorial Army, but was discharged the following year. He then adopted the persona of SAS member Tom Palmer, one of the soldiers who ended the 1980 Iranian Embassy Siege.

In both March and August 1980, George was arrested and charged for indecent assault, going to trial on the two counts in June 1981; he was acquitted of indecent assault against one woman, and convicted of indecent assault against another woman, for which he received a three-month sentence, suspended for two years. Using the name Steve Majors, he claimed to be a stuntman and convinced a stadium to stage a show in which he would jump over four double-decker buses on roller skates; he injured himself attempting this stunt.

In January 1983, George was charged with rape for a February 1982 sexual assault of a woman in Acton; in March 1983, he was convicted at the Old Bailey, untruthfully stating his name to be Steve Majors, for attempted rape in the February 1982 attack, for which he served 18 months of a 33-month sentence. On 10 January 1983, as was revealed after his arrest for the Dando murder, George had been found in the grounds of Kensington Palace, at that time the home of Prince Charles and Diana, Princess of Wales. He had been discovered hiding in the grounds wearing a balaclava and carrying a poem he had written to Prince Charles.

On 2 May 1989 at Fulham register office, George married a 35-year-old Japanese student, Itsuko Toide, in what Toide described as a marriage "of convenience – but nonetheless violent and terrifying". After four months she reported to the police that he had assaulted her. On 29 October 1989, George was arrested and charged, but the case was dropped and did not go to court; the marriage ended in April 1990.

In April 1990, and again in January 1992, George was arrested and charged with indecent assault. Neither case went to court. At the time of Dando's murder, he was using the pseudonym Barry Bulsara, telling people that he was the cousin of Freddie Mercury (born Farrokh Bulsara), and gave that name after the murder when he contacted various businesses, seeking alibi video footage to prove he was present at any of those businesses at the time of the murder. These actions led to tips from the businesses that brought George (then believed to be George Bulsara) to the attention of the police unit investigating the murder, though these initial tips, amongst the thousands received in the days immediately following the murder, were not connected as referring to one person – and pursued by police – until a year after the murder.

== Overturned conviction for murder of Jill Dando ==
On 26 April 1999, newsreader Jill Dando was shot dead outside her home. George (who at the time of the murder lived in a ground floor flat in Crookham Road, Fulham) was arrested for her murder on 25 May 2000, and charged on 29 May 2000. A search of his apartment had uncovered over 4,000 photographs of hundreds of women covertly taken in public by George, along with other photos of well-known female TV personalities such as Caron Keating, Anthea Turner, Fiona Foster and Emma Freud, along with newspaper article cuttings about Dando's life and media career. Police also discovered a photo of George wearing a military gas mask while posing with a modified Bruni blank-firing handgun. When shown this image during interrogation, he admitted it was him in the photo and that he had purchased the weapon via mail order; however, he denied that it had been converted to fire live ammunition.

Before his trial for the Dando murder, George was diagnosed with Asperger syndrome. Prosecution psychologists studying George concluded that he had several different personality disorders: antisocial, histrionic, narcissistic and possibly paranoid, as well as somatization and factitious disorders and attention deficit hyperactivity disorder. He was said to have epilepsy and to have an IQ of 75; however, a prior assessment found George to be of average intelligence.

He was convicted by a majority of 10 to one, and was sentenced to life imprisonment on 2 July 2001. This verdict was considered unsafe by some observers at the time.

=== Appeals ===
In 2002, George appealed his conviction, with his legal team disputing his identification as Dando's killer and the reliability of forensic evidence used in the trial. The Court of Appeal dismissed the appeal.

In March 2006, George's lawyers sought an appeal on fresh evidence based on medical examinations suggesting he was not capable of committing the crime because of his mental disabilities. The defence brought in neuropsychiatrist Michael Kopelman to dispute the prosecution's claim that George showed signs of "histrionics, paranoia and narcissism" and had a personality disorder. Kopelman testified that "[He] described to me that he can be aware of what's going on around him but he just can't respond", and concluded that George was not calculating enough to have committed the crime.

A second defence argument was that two new witnesses say they saw armed police at the scene when George was arrested, contrary to official reports about the circumstances of his arrest – the Metropolitan Police maintain there were no armed officers present during the arrest of George. There was scientific evidence alleged to link George to the murder in the form of a single microscopic particle of what was said to have been gunshot residue, together with evidence as to the character of a fibre found on his clothing. It was argued by the defence that the presence of armed officers and their involvement in his arrest might have been responsible for the gunshot residue.

In September 2006, following investigations by George's campaigners and a BBC Panorama documentary about the conviction conducted by miscarriage of justice victim Raphael Rowe, first broadcast in the UK on 5 September 2006 and which included an interview with the foreman of the trial jury, fresh evidence was submitted to the Criminal Cases Review Commission by the programme-makers and by George's solicitor. The evidence concerned scientific analysis of the alleged gunshot residue, witness evidence and psychiatric reports.

On 20 June 2007, the Criminal Cases Review Commission announced that it would refer George's case to the Court of Appeal. On 22 August 2007, George was refused bail prior to the hearing, which began on 5 November 2007. One of the defence team's main grounds of appeal was that the single particle of gunshot residue in the coat pocket was not evidence which conclusively linked George to the crime scene; it could have appeared as a result of contamination of the coat when it was placed on a mannequin to be photographed as police evidence.

On 7 November 2007, the Court of Appeal reserved judgement in the case and on 15 November 2007 announced that the appeal was allowed and the conviction quashed. In summary, the reasoning of the Court was that at the trial the prosecution had relied primarily on four categories of evidence:

1. One witness who had identified him as being in Jill Dando's street four and a half hours before the murder and other witnesses who, although they could not pick George out at an identity parade, saw a man in the street in the two hours before the murder who might have been George;
2. Alleged lies told by George in interview;
3. An alleged attempt to create a false alibi;
4. The single particle of firearm discharge residue (FDR) found, about a year after the murder, in George's overcoat.

The prosecution had called expert witnesses at the trial whose evidence suggested that it was likely that the particle of FDR came from a gun fired by George rather than from some other source. A forensic scientist, interviewed in a 2019 BBC documentary on the case, stated that potentially one in a hundred people could have gunshot residue on their clothing, picked up from someone else, possibly a hobby shooter or armed police officer. Those witnesses and other witnesses from the Forensic Science Service told the Court of Appeal that this was not the right conclusion to draw from the discovery of the particle of FDR. It was instead no more likely that the particle had come from a gun fired by George than that it had come from some other source.

The Court of Appeal concluded that, if this evidence had been given to the jury at the trial, there was no certainty that the jury would have found George guilty. For this reason his conviction had to be quashed. A retrial was ordered and George was remanded in custody, making no application for bail.

=== Retrial ===
George appeared before the Old Bailey on 14 December 2007 and again pleaded not guilty to the murder. His retrial began on 9 June 2008. Initially there was a large amount of coverage in the press, especially of the prosecution portrayal of the defendant as being highly obsessive, lacking in social skills and a danger to women. The prosecution case differed from that of the first trial in that there was practically no scientific evidence as the evidence relating to the FDR was ruled inadmissible by the trial judge, Mr Justice Griffith Williams. There was much evidence of George's bad character which was admitted in the re-trial at the discretion of the trial judge, as a result of the enactment of the Criminal Justice Act 2003 since the original trial. There were delays due to legal arguments and to the illnesses of the defendant and one of the jurors.

For the defence, William Clegg QC reminded the jury that evidence from three women from HAFAD (Hammersmith and Fulham Action on Disability) placed the defendant's arrival at their offices at 11:50 or 12:00, which, according to Clegg's argument, would have made it impossible for him to have committed a murder at Dando's house at 11:30 and then gone home (in the wrong direction) to change. Two neighbours who almost certainly saw the murderer immediately after the shooting had seen him go off in this direction, and later failed to identify George at an identification parade. The trial ended with George's acquittal on 1 August 2008.

== Life after Dando acquittal ==
In 2010, George moved to Ireland to be closer to his sister. Both he and his sister were interviewed for the 2023 Netflix documentary series Who Killed Jill Dando?

George has won damages from tabloid newspapers over various allegations published about him, at least twice pursuing these libel claims to the High Court. In December 2009, following mediation, he accepted an undisclosed amount from Rupert Murdoch's News Group Newspapers over articles published in The Sun and the News of the World. In May 2010 Mirror Group Newspapers settled with George after claims, unrelated to the Dando murder, that he had developed an obsession with singer Cheryl and newsreader Kay Burley.

In April 2010, it emerged that the Ministry of Justice had denied a claim of £1.4 million compensation made by George in respect of his wrongful imprisonment for Jill Dando's murder. The decision was made by Jack Straw, the Justice Secretary and in August 2010 the High Court ruled that George was entitled to a judicial review of the matter.

On 11 May 2011, the Supreme Court defined "miscarriage of justice" as evidence "so undermined that no conviction could possibly be based upon it". This decision cleared the way for George's solicitor, Nicholas Baird, to request that the Justice Secretary Ken Clarke "consider afresh" George's claim for compensation, applying the new test set out by the Court. The claim was heard in the High Court but in their summing up, judges Lord Justice Beatson and Mr Justice Irwin said: "There was indeed a case upon which a reasonable jury properly directed could have convicted the claimant of murder" and on the strength of this, denied George compensation for wrongful incarceration.

In September 2025, George was charged with one count of rape and two counts of indecent assault relating to allegations from 1987 involving a 14-year-old girl in west London. He appeared at the Old Bailey for a case management hearing in November 2025. He remains on bail with a pre-trial date set for April 2027.

== See also ==
- List of miscarriage of justice cases
- Colin Stagg
