= Criminal Cases Review Commission =

Statutory body in the United Kingdom

- Formation: 31 March 1997; 29 years ago
- Legal status: Non-departmental public body
- Headquarters: Birmingham
- Region served: England; Wales; Northern Ireland
- Chairperson: Vera Baird
- Chief Executive Officer: Tracey Calleia (interim)
- Website: ccrc.gov.uk

The Criminal Cases Review Commission (CCRC) is the statutory body responsible for investigating alleged miscarriages of justice in England, Wales, and Northern Ireland. It was established by Section 8 of the Criminal Appeal Act 1995 and began work on 31 March 1997. The commission is the only body in its area of jurisdiction with the power to send a case back to an appeals court if it concludes that there is a real possibility that the court will overturn a conviction or reduce a sentence. Since starting work in 1997, it has on average referred 33 cases a year for appeal.

== Responsibilities ==
From 31 March 1997 to 30 September 2017, the commission referred 634 cases back to appeals courts, or almost one case for every eight working days (see casework statistics below). Those referrals came from a total of 21,780 cases closed during that period, meaning that the commission has referred for appeal around 2.91% of the applications it has considered. Of the cases it has referred, approximately 66.1% have succeeded on appeal.

The cases referred for appeal by the commission tend to come from the most serious end of the criminal spectrum; just over 25% of referrals have been for murder convictions, almost 12% have been for rapes, and 8% have been for robberies. The rest relate to a mixture of other offences, mostly serious and indictable-only.

The Criminal Appeal Act 1995, which created the commission, requires it to consider applications regarding convictions from both the Crown Court and magistrates' courts. About 90% of all applications received, and 95% of the commission's referrals, relate to Crown Court cases for which the appellate court is the Court of Appeal. Magistrates' court cases are appealed in the Crown Court.

The commission currently receives around 1,500 applications a year. Applications are made in writing by people with criminal convictions or by their representatives. It is not necessary to have a lawyer to apply to the commission, but around half of all applicants are assisted by a lawyer.

Applications can relate to a conviction, a sentence, or both. Around 85% of the commission's referrals relate to convictions, and 15% to sentences. A small handful of cases have been referred for both conviction and sentence.

The commission is essentially a post-appeal organisation, and applicants to it almost always need to have appealed, or at least sought leave to appeal, before the commission can agree to review their case. In some cases, where there are exceptional circumstances, the commission can review a case in the absence of a prior attempt to appeal.

In order to refer a case for appeal, the commission usually has to identify new evidence or a new legal argument that makes the case look significantly different. This evidence or argument must not have been considered at the time of the trial, at the initial appeal, or in an earlier application to the commission. Again, there is an "exceptional circumstances" caveat that allows the commission to refer cases with no new evidence or argument, but such instances are extremely rare.

In 2009, the commission's jurisdiction was extended to cover convictions and sentences arising from the Court Martial or Service Civilian Court.

The commission was the subject of a Justice Select Committee inquiry from 2014 to 2015. The inquiry received 47 written submissions and took oral evidence from 14 people.

The commission is an independent non-departmental public body funded by way of a cash grant from the Ministry of Justice. It is based in Birmingham and has around 90 staff members, plus Commissioners. Its budget for 2016–17 was around £5.4 million.

Scotland has its own legal system, and there is a separate Scottish CCRC.

== Casework statistics ==
The CCRC started work in April 1997. Between then and the end of November 2019 it had:

- Referred 676 cases
- Of the 658 cases where appeals had been heard by the courts, 442 appeals were allowed and 203 dismissed
- 593 cases were still under review at the Commission as of November 2019, and 138 were awaiting consideration.
- So far they had received a total of 25,819 applications (including all ineligible cases) and completed 25,087 cases.

The difference between the total number of CCRC referrals heard by the appeal courts and the number of outcomes recorded is accounted for by cases where the appeal proceedings have been heard but the judgement is awaited and a number of cases that were referred by the CCRC but the appeal was abandoned.

== Background ==
Before the creation of the CCRC, the only resort for a case that had already been to the Court of Appeal (or the Northern Ireland Court of Appeal) was a direct appeal to the Home Secretary or the Secretary of State for Northern Ireland. Only these officials had the power to order the court to hear a case again. This power was limited to cases tried on indictment, and only four or five cases were referred each year from around 700 applications. The power was also reactive in that the secretary could considered the issues raised by only applicants or their representatives, and could not investigate further or seek new grounds for appeal. A source of frequent criticism was that the same person responsible for the police could control whether or not a conviction was overturned.

In the 1970s, a series of convictions were later found to be illegitimate: those of the Guildford Four (1974), the Birmingham Six (1975), the Maguire Seven (1976), and Judith Ward (1974). These cases featured a mixture of false confessions, police misconduct, non-disclosure, and unreliable expert forensic testimony. An additional factor affecting the decision-making during the investigation and prosecution of these cases was their high public profile, resulting in pressure to obtain convictions and restore public confidence.

The weaknesses in the criminal justice system exposed by these cases led to the establishment of a Royal Commission on Criminal Justice in 1991. Its mandate included considering whether changes were needed in the arrangements for considering and investigating allegations of miscarriages of justice when appeal rights have been exhausted. Evidence was gathered over a two-year period. The Royal Commission published its report in July 1993. It concluded (adopting the view expressed by Sir John May in his inquiry into the Guildford and Woolwich bombings) that the arrangements for referring cases back to the courts were incompatible with the constitutional separation of judicial and executive powers. The recommendations of the Royal Commission led to the Criminal Appeal Act of 1995, which established the Criminal Cases Review Commission.

Bob Woffinden wrote in The Guardian in 2010 that he believed the CCRC should stop counting certain cases as a "quashed case", such as when only a sentence is changed, or any case in which alternative convictions are upheld. He also objected to it counting its successes in terms of individual people rather than cases, and to the CCRC overturning relatively minor convictions. The commission's response to this criticism was to refer to its case work statistics which show, as mentioned above, that just over 25% of its more than 600 referrals have been for murder convictions, almost 12% have been for rapes, and 8% have been for robberies and the rest relate to a mixture of other offences, mostly serious and indictable-only. A number of the cases Woffinden himself worked on were also overturned due to the CCRC, such as that of Sion Jenkins and Barry George. In the case of James Hanratty, Woffinden successfully campaigned for the CCRC to refer the case to the Court of Appeal, only for new DNA tests to prove his guilt and cause the rejection of his appeal. As of 2024, the CCRC had helped quash more than 100 miscarriages of justice in the preceding three years.

The first governing body was composed of a Board of 15 Commission Members. The first chairman was Sir Frederick Crawford. Contrary to common opinion, it is independent of the government and not a government organisation. It is independent of the police, the courts and governments and any political body. The commissioners are appointed by the Crown and also the CCRC's own independent board. As at February 2025, there were only nine commissioners, when there should be twelve.

== Impact of austerity ==
In 2018, Jon Robins wrote in the New Law Journal that the commission had been underfunded by the government's austerity measures, noting that for every £10 that the commission could spend on cases in 2008, it now only has £4, and it referred only 12 cases to the Court of Appeal in 2017. The CCRC received £7 million from the MoJ in 2003/4 and £6.5 million in 2009/10. In 2017/18 its income dropped to £5.6 million. Applications to the commission have increased, from 885 in 2003/4 to 1,439 in 2017/18. It is feared that cuts to legal aid and failure to disclose evidence have increased the risk of miscarriages of justice so the commission is more needed than it was in the past.

Despite this, as of 2023 the CCRC's target is to complete a minimum of 85% of cases within 12 months of receipt of the application. This target had previously been 36 weeks but was revised as this target had been successfully and consistently achieved in 2021/22.

== History, analysis and response ==
The CCRC was the first organisation of its kind in the world, and The Guardian noted that several high-profile prisoners "owe their freedom" to the CCRC, such as Barry George, Sally Clark and Sion Jenkins. Others who died before they could be cleared were able to be posthumously exonerated due to the CCRC, such as Derek Bentley. Winston Trew, one of the Oval Four who were exonerated due to the CCRC in 2019, said that "had it not been for the work of my case officer, Mrs. Anona Bisping, at the CCRC, in putting together and submitting an excellent of Statement of Reasons to the Court of Appeal, my convictions may well not have been overturned. The role of the CCRC is not just necessary but vital to overturning miscarriages of justice." An anonymous individual whose conviction in the Post Office scandal was overturned due to the work of the CCRC has stated "I have nothing but praise for the work the CCRC did for me and my ex-colleagues. If you are in a similar situation where you know you have been wrongly convicted, I urge you to contact them". The University of Oxford social sciences department noted that, as well as Barry George, people such as a group of legal asylum seekers and refugees who narrowly avoided being wrongly deported in 2005 had been "spared" from miscarriages of justice "thanks to the Criminal Cases Review Commission".

Speaking on the 2011 documentary Retrial by TV: The Rise and Fall of Rough Justice, which focused on the history of the programme Rough Justice that had been credited with contributing to the establishment of the CCRC in 1997, High Court judge Mr Justice Sweeney commented that the commission "is undoubtedly a valuable extension of the system, particularly because it provides an independent, responsible and continuing safety net by which to catch potential miscarriages of justice and put them right". The idea of a body like the CCRC had long been promoted by the organisation JUSTICE, which had been the inspiration and support for Rough Justice. The 2011 documentary described the establishment of the CCRC as "the very thing" that JUSTICE and its leader Tom Sargent had been arguing for since the 1960s, and its creation was described as a "posthumous achievement" for Sargent, whose idea it originally was. Rough Justice producer Simon Ford observed that "nearly everybody who was involved in making miscarriages programmes wanted a criminal cases review body", and that the CCRC's creation provided an official way of looking into miscarriages, which was "a great thing". The presenter of Rough Justice David Jessel became a commissioner on the CCRC after it was founded, feeling like others that the introduction of the CCRC had "fixed" the justice system and that there was no more need of television programmes to raise questions about potential miscarriages. After stepping down from his role after 10 years Jessel criticised the "caricature" of the CCRC as an "institutional villain".

Commissioners have disagreed with claims that they are "too cautious" in making referrals by pointing to how they have in fact often allowed applicants to take their case to the Court of Appeal despite still suspecting them to be guilty, with former commissioner Ewan Smith saying in 2011: "In the four and a half years I've been on the Commission, I have only come across two people I believed to be absolutely innocent. In all the other cases I've sent back to the Court of Appeal, I've only been able to say I thought their conviction was unsafe. I have certainly referred people back who I personally believed were guilty". In the case of Simon Hall, who had been supported by Rough Justice and was the first UK case worked on by an innocence project to be granted an appeal by the CCRC, the referred applicant's guilt was later conclusively proved when he admitted his crimes. Prior to this Hall's supporters in the University of Bristol Innocence Project had accused the CCRC and Court of Appeal of not taking "claims of innocence seriously" and claimed that they hadn't been seeking "the truth of whether alleged victims of wrongful convicted are innocent or not". David Jessel, the miscarriage of justice campaigner who was a CCRC commissioner between 2000 and 2010, described claims that the CCRC is not concerned with innocence as "nonsense".

=== CEO Karen Kneller ===
In January 2025, the Justice Select Committee of the House of Commons wrote to the Justice Secretary, Shabana Mahmood, requesting that the Committee should have pre-appointment scrutiny over the role of chair of the CCRC.

In May 2025, the chair of the Committee said of Karen Kneller, the Chief Executive of the Commission: "As a result of our concerns regarding the performance of the CCRC and the unpersuasive evidence Karen Kneller provided to the committee, we no longer feel that it is tenable for her to continue as chief executive of the CCRC."

In May 2025, Vera Baird was appointed as Chair of the Commission on an interim basis, until December 2026. She will conduct a review of the operation of the Commission.

In July 2025, Kneller resigned and Amanda Pearce was appointed as interim chief executive.

== Malkinson case ==
The CCRC has been criticised for its handling of the wrongful conviction of Andrew Malkinson. The Commission was warned in 2013, as a result of a review in another case, that it should check DNA evidence, but failed to do so. As a result of the failure, Malkinson’s conviction was not quashed until 2023. In July 2024, an independent review of the case concluded that the Commission had failed in the Malkinson case. The Justice Secretary, Shabana Mahmood, said she was seeking the removal of Helen Pitcher from her position as chair of the Commission. In January 2025, Pitcher resigned. She said she had been made a scapegoat. Malkinson described this comment as "shameless", and said "I know what it truly is like to be a scapegoat." After Pitcher’s resignation, Malkinson said action was needed on the Commission to "refresh the whole thing, call it something else, completely dissolve it".

== See also ==
- Scottish Criminal Cases Review Commission
- Wrongful conviction of Andrew Malkinson
