= Diogenes Small =

Diogenes Small (1797–1812) is a fictional character created by the English crime writer Colin Dexter in his Inspector Morse series of novels. The character, the supposed author of numerous historical and other works, does not appear in the novels although Dexter has used his quotations.

One of the distinctive features of Dexter's Inspector Morse novels is the use of quotations as chapter headings, which began in the second novel in the series, Last Seen Wearing (1976); then in the fourth, Service of All the Dead (1979); and in the sixth, The Riddle of the Third Mile (1983) onwards. However, it was not always possible to find suitable quotations for every chapter, so many were simply invented by Dexter and attributed to non-existent sources, the most common of which was Diogenes Small. These appeared in the last five novels of the series: The Jewel That Was Ours (1991), The Way Through the Woods (1992), The Daughters of Cain (1994), Death Is Now My Neighbour (1996), and The Remorseful Day (1999). Over twenty years, Dexter created a lengthy bibliography for the fictional author, including Small's Enlarged Dictionary, which apparently ran to at least 18 editions within Small's tragically short lifespan.

From time to time, these quotations have appeared elsewhere, such as in newspapers with a "thought for the day" or "humorous quotes" feature, possibly because the contributors admired Dexter's conceit, or simply because they accepted the attributions at face value.
