= List of Inspector Morse episodes =

Inspector Morse is a British television crime drama, starring John Thaw and Kevin Whately, for which eight series were broadcast between 1987 and 2000, totalling thirty-three episodes. Although the last five episodes were each broadcast a year apart (two years before the final episode), when released on DVD, they were billed as Series Eight.

== Series overview ==
Series	Episodes	Originally released	
Series	Episodes	First released	Last released
1	3	6 January 1987	20 January 1987
2	4	25 December 1987	22 March 1988
3	4	4 January 1989	25 January 1989
4	4	3 January 1990	24 January 1990
5	5	20 February 1991	27 March 1991
6	5	26 February 1992	15 April 1992
7	3	6 January 1993	20 January 1993
8	5	29 November 1995	15 November 2000

== Episodes ==
=== Series 1 (1987) ===
No. overall	No. in series	Title	Directed by	Written by	Original release date
1	1	"The Dead of Jericho"	Alastair Reid	Anthony Minghella	6 January 1987
Anne Stavely, a fellow chorister and romantic interest of Morse, is found hanged at her home in Jericho. Her death is presumed to be a suicide but Morse investigates, despite not being assigned to the case. While searching for a suicide note at her home, he encounters Sergeant Lewis. The suicide note was taken by neighbour George Jackson, who uses information from the note to extort money from Stavely's former employers, Alan and Tony Richards. At a meeting of the choir two weeks after Stavely's death, Alan Richards gives a talk and is introduced to Morse. Jackson is found to have been murdered during the time of the talk, which would give Richards an alibi. Morse convinces DCS Strange that he is not involved in Stavely's death and is asked to take on the case. Lewis is appointed his bagman, beginning their long partnership Under questioning by Morse, Alan Richards admits an earlier affair with Stavely, which led to her leaving his company. His wife Adele admits stopping by Stavely's home and finding her dead. Morse remembers the book Oedipus Rex on Stavely's bedside table and theorises that Ned Murdoch, a local musical prodigy taken under Stavely's maternal care, was the son she had given up for adoption; and that her realisation led to her suicide. Lewis is sent to find whether that could be true and to take fingerprints of Tony and Adele Richards, but both come to naught. Stavely's son lives in Wales, and the Richards' fingerprints do not match any taken from the Jackson murder. While reviewing his findings to Morse in front of the Richards brothers, Lewis inadvertently cracks the case by introducing himself to Tony Richards, revealing that he had actually taken fingerprints from Alan. The brothers had switched identities throughout the events, and Tony had killed Jackson to protect his brother and their firm's reputation.
2	2	"The Silent World of Nicholas Quinn"	Brian Parker	Julian Mitchell	13 January 1987
When Nicholas Quinn, a deaf member of Oxford's Foreign Examinations Syndicate, is found dead at his home, Morse presumes murder, and Quinn's fellow syndics soon become suspects. Morse and Lewis investigate the movements of the staff on the Friday afternoon in question. The staff consists of Martin, Roope, Ogleby, Bartlett and the attractive divorcee Monica Height. Noakes, the caretaker, swears he saw Quinn leave the offices late on Friday evening, but he actually saw a man in only Quinn's coat drive away in his car. Ogleby seems suspicious under questioning, but Morse is delighted to discover that he is the crossword setter calling himself Daedalus, with whom Morse has matched wits for years. After this initial questioning, Ogleby is brutally murdered. Morse and Lewis surmise that Quinn's predecessor Bland leaked exam papers to the education department of a country called "Al-Jamara", that Quinn discovered this and told Ogleby, and that this was the motive behind at least one of the murders. Quinn was killed, and Ogleby was murdered when he investigated. Morse confidently but mistakenly arrests Roope for Quinn's murder. Roope's alibi, that he arrived in Oxford late on the afternoon of the murder, is confirmed by a college dean he met on the train platform, and he is released without charge. Roope meets Bartlett soon after, and Morse arrests both of them, suspecting that Bartlett needed the illicit income to pay for treatment for his mentally unstable son. Remembering that Bartlett had told him Quinn accused him of selling the exam questions, Morse realises Quinn had mistaken "Donald Martin" for "Doctor Bartlett" when lip reading, and that Martin committed the murders with Roope as his accomplice. Morse confronts Martin at his home and ends up in a violent struggle, from which Lewis saves him.
3	3	"Service of All the Dead"	Peter Hammond	Julian Mitchell	20 January 1987
Morse and Lewis are called to St Oswald's where the churchwarden, Harry Josephs, is reported to have been stabbed by a local vagrant following a service. While the hunt for the vagrant begins, the vicar, Lionel Pawlen, and his congregation are all eyed with suspicion. Max the pathologist informs Morse that the dead man had a lethal amount of morphine in his system when he was stabbed, suggesting that two people tried to kill him. Tipped off by another vagrant that the suspect may be the vicar's brother, Morse invites Pawlen in for questioning, but while Morse and Lewis are waiting for him, Pawlen throws himself off the church tower. Meanwhile, Morse takes a romantic interest in the church caretaker, Ruth, who seems amenable but is somewhat evasive to his attention. Several scenes make it clear that she is having an affair with an as-yet unidentified man. Over the next few days, Paul Morris, the organist, is found murdered, and Brenda Josephs, with whom Morris had been having an affair, and Morris's son are all found dead. Morse returns to the church and hides in the confessional. When Ruth arrives, she is confronted by her lover, who attempts to strangle her. Morse intervenes and after an awkward struggle, follows the man up the tower stairs, despite his fear of heights. The two men fight at the top of the tower, until Lewis arrives and hits the attacker over the head with a candlestick. He staggers away and falls over the edge to his death. As they take away the body, Morse explains that the killer is Harry Josephs, who was thought to have been the original victim. Lionel Pawlen and his congregants conspired in the original murder of Lionel's brother Simon, the vagrant. Simon had been left out of a great inheritance from an aunt owing to his wayward lifestyle and had grown vindictive towards Lionel, spreading rumours about the vicar's behaviour towards choir boys that had forced him out of his previous parish. The original murder was an elaborate way of getting rid of Simon. Lionel used an invented church service, The Feast of the Conversion of St Augustine, and a conspiracy of his congregants, with whom he would share his inherited wealth, to execute the plan. The congregants agreed falsely to identify the body as Harry Josephs, who used this cover to exact revenge on his wife, Brenda, her lover, Paul Morris, and Morris's son. Lionel's death was suicide, spurred by the guilt of his brother's murder and suspecting that his deceit would soon be uncovered by Morse.

=== Series 2 (1987–88) ===
No. overall	No. in series	Title	Directed by	Written by	Original release date
4	1	"The Wolvercote Tongue"	Alastair Reid	Julian Mitchell	25 December 1987
A tour group of older Americans descend on the Randolph Hotel, including a woman who is about to donate a priceless artefact, the "Wolvercote Tongue", to the Ashmolean Museum. When she is found dead shortly after arriving and the Tongue is missing from her hotel room, Morse suspects foul play, despite the hotel doctor's insistence that she died from natural causes. The chief suspect is the woman's husband, Eddie Poindexter, who soon disappears. The following evening, Morse and Lewis's attention is diverted to Theodore Kemp (Simon Callow), the colourful museum curator whose naked body is found floating in the River Cherwell. Morse is convinced that these are two murders connected to the theft, but he has no evidence. Kemp's disabled wife commits suicide after learning of his death, and Morse stumbles into a new line of inquiry by considering the movements of the other expert connected to the tour, Cedric Downes (Kenneth Cranham), and his wife, whom Morse and Lewis happen to intercept as she makes her way to London with a suitcase. Later that day, they confront Downes on the platform of Oxford station. His account of when he learned of Kemp's death does not match his wife's, and when Lewis and Morse are distracted by seeing Poindexter step off a train, Downes make an unsuccessful attempt to escape. Poindexter and Downes confess. Poindexter admits that his wife's death, unsurprising given her heart condition, occurred in his presence, and that he took the Tongue in order to throw it into the river and collect the insurance money. During his disappearance he connected with his long-lost daughter. Downes claims that Kemp's death was an accident and occurred after a confrontation when he had returned home to collect his notes for his lecture, only to find his wife with Kemp in flagrante. After some bending of the truth from Morse, Downes admits to killing his wife in London where she had gone to dispose of Kemp's clothing. The Wolvercote Tongue is retrieved from the river, and Morse admits that, despite his prior insistence, there were two cases here rather than one: the original death was indeed of natural causes, and the subsequent murders were not related to the theft. Based on an original story by Colin Dexter, which he subsequently novelised as The Jewel That Was Ours.
5	2	"Last Seen Wearing"	Edward Bennett	Thomas Ellice	8 March 1988
Valerie Craven, the daughter of a local building magnate, has been missing for six months, and an otherwise-idle Morse is assigned the case. When a letter with a London postmark arrives, purportedly from the missing girl, initial inquiries take Morse and Lewis in the direction of her former boyfriend John Maguire. Guesswork from Morse surprisingly strikes home, and it is established that the girl is, or was, pregnant. The headstrong headmaster of Valerie's school, Donald Phillipson, and a former teacher, David Acum, become suspects. When the deputy head, Cheryl Baines, is found dead at her home, Lewis lashes out at Morse for his previous insistence that the case involved murder, now confirmed. Strange calls him to task for bending the rules, particularly for forging a second note from Valerie to the police. A neighbour of Baines reports seeing a woman go into Baines's home on the evening of her death, and Lewis realises it was Phillipson's wife, Sheila. She comes in for questioning and insists that all she encountered at the home was Baines's body at the bottom of the stairs. She tells Morse and Lewis that as she left she saw Acum waiting in a car around the corner. Acum is brought in, but after a brief questioning Morse seems content to let him go. He insists on driving Acum back to Reading and when Acum claims his wife is not home Morse gladly accepts the invitation to wait for her. Once inside Morse calls out for Valerie and she emerges from upstairs, Morse having realised that he had already met Valerie when he had called at Acum's house earlier on but did not recognise her, as she was wearing a face pack at the time. Morse brings Valerie home, and she finds her mother in a discussion with Phillipson and his wife. Phillipson admits that he and Grace Craven were having an affair and claims they were together the night Baines died. Despite previously confirming that to Morse, Grace now insists he was lying and that the affair ended months ago. Valerie explains that she had visited Baines on the evening in question and that she saw Phillipson arrive as she was leaving. After claiming that both Grace and Valerie were lying, Phillipson finally admits to a struggle with Baines that led to her accidental death and is taken into police custody.
6	3	"The Settling of the Sun"	Peter Hammond	Charles Wood	15 March 1988
Morse is hoping to rekindle a romantic relationship with Dr Jane Robson and is with her at an Oxford college when a foreign summer student is murdered. The Japanese man, Yukio Li, had excused himself from dinner and was discovered in his room in a ritual pose with injuries to his face, hands and feet and a dagger in his chest. Max, the pathologist, surmises that the cuts were made to hide marks from being bound and gagged and that the lack of blood would indicate that the man had been dead for some time before he was actually stabbed. A video cassette in a jiffy bag addressed to Yukio is found in the students' coach. The bag contains traces of heroin, and Robson tells Morse that Yukio was a drug dealer who had been to the summer school previously. Graham Daniels, another member of the summer school staff, is found dead, and Morse begins to suspect that there is a wider plot and that his presence at the college dinner may have been contrived to provide alibis for the attendees. Morse's suspicions grow, particularly towards Kurt Friedman, a German who may not be who he seems, and Sir Wilfred Mulryne, a don of the college who reviews all summer school applications. Superintendent Dewar from London tells Morse to drop the investigation, but this only strengthens Morse's resolve. Morse pesters Dr Robson, who finally admits that the man pretending to be Kurt Friedman is her brother Michael. Morse realised that there was a second Japanese man who pretended to be Yukio Li at the college. He deduced that the real Yukio had been kidnapped, bound and gagged and eventually murdered. But Dr Robson says Yukio tried to escape and was accidentally killed by the double, who was supposed to be guarding him. Michael had mutilated the body, as revenge for the torture of their father in Japan during WWII at the hands of Yukio's father, a relationship Mulryne had disclosed to her. When Michael Robson's body is found in the showers, Morse realises that the plan had gone awry. Yukio had overpowered and killed the double, then pretended to be the double and escaped. He used the cover of his apparent death to exact revenge on those complicit in the plot against him, starting with Daniels, who was Michael's son, and then Michael himself. Morse realises that Dr Robson is next and rushes to her aid, only to find that someone had already rescued her by striking Yukio in the head with a croquet mallet as he was strangling her. Morse finds Mrs Warbut, of the college bursary office, in the church, who confesses to turning a blind eye to the plot. It is implied that she finally killed Yukio and saved Dr Robson. Warbut grew up in Japan and was scarred and embittered by the knowledge of what happened to Dr Robson's father and many others during the war.
7	4	"Last Bus to Woodstock"	Peter Duffell	Michael Wilcox	22 March 1988
Morse and Lewis are called to a pub outside Oxford where a young woman named Sylvia Kane has been found dead in the car park, seemingly run over but with scratches on her face that suggest an attack. An envelope is found in Sylvia's purse, addressed to her superior at work, Jennifer Coleby, and containing what Morse identifies as a coded letter. Inquiries begin at the Oxford assurance company where both women worked. Morse presumes the envelope contained a large quantity of cash. The young man Sylvia was meeting at the pub begins to spend money in an extravagant fashion, soon gets into trouble and is brought into the station. He admits that he took the money and Sylvia's necklace after discovering her body, but despite this confession, Morse is not convinced that he killed her and lets him go. Mrs Jarman, an elderly woman who recognised Sylvia on a television appeal hosted by Morse, contacts the police and says she saw Sylvia get into a red car at a bus stop on the night in question. She mentions that another person was with Sylvia but did not get into the car. Sylvia departed with the words, "See you in the morning." A few days later, Mrs Jarman sees the same car, which had a broken tail light, and notes the registration number. The car is registered to Margaret Crowther, wife of Dr Bernard Crowther, an Oxford don whom Morse recently heard give a lecture. Dr Crowther was driving the car the night of Sylvia's death and has admitted to his wife that he picked her up, stopped for a drink with her, and took her to the pub where her body was found. He claims that she came on to him, and when he rejected her, she became angry and left the car. He says that when he backed his car out he felt "a slight bump", which he thought was a kerb, and drove home. His wife refuses his desire to contact the police and confess, because he is in line for a prestigious professorship. Crowther has a heart attack while he and his wife are disposing of evidence from her car. When Morse and Lewis arrive at the Crowther home to question him, they are surprised to encounter pathologist Max, who is Mrs Crowther's uncle. In discussing the Kane case, Max mentions that she had previously injured her elbow and had a therapy appointment at the hospital the day after her death. Remembering how Sylvia had said "See you in the morning" to her companion, Morse realises that it must be someone who works at the hospital. Lewis suggests it could be the nurse who lives in Jennifer Coleby's home, Mary Widdowson. Widdowson confesses the truth to Morse. She and Crowther were having an affair. He wanted to avoid any possibility of scandal while under consideration for the professorship, so he sent her the money to take a holiday and be absent for a while. The money was to get to her via Coleby, but Sylvia Kane intercepted it. When Sylvia was coincidentally picked up by Crowther at the bus stop, Mary Widdowson did not get in. Instead, she followed them on the bus to see what would happen between them. When Sylvia got out of the car at the pub, Mary confronted her and knocked her to the ground. Crowther inadvertently ran over her as he reversed out of the car park. Although the death was not murder, Widdowson is led away by the police for her hand in it, as Crowther regains consciousness in his hospital bed.

=== Series 3 (1989) ===
No. overall	No. in series	Title	Directed by	Written by	Original release date
8	1	"Ghost in the Machine"	Herbert Wise	Julian Mitchell	4 January 1989
Morse and Lewis are sent to Hanbury House where an upper-class family has apparently suffered a break-in and the theft of a number of paintings. Sir Julius Hanbury is nowhere to be seen, which is particularly unusual since he is vying to be the next Master of an Oxford college and the vote is tied. Exploring the grounds of Hanbury House, Morse is shown into the family mausoleum, where the battered body of Sir Julius is discovered. Soon after, Roger Meadows, the boyfriend of the family's au pair, Michelle – whom Lady Hanbury has just let go – overturns his sports car driving away from the house and is killed. Lewis notices that his brake lines have been cut. A new forensic pathologist, Dr. Grayling Russell, replaces her predecessor Max, who had a severe stroke. She tells Morse that Sir Julius had injuries "consistent with a fall from a great height", which may or may not be what killed him. Pressured by Morse, Lady Hanbury admits that Sir Julius's death was suicide and that she and the gardener, John McKendrick, made it look like murder to present a less scandalous story and to preserve the life insurance payment. The supposed theft was also part of the plan, and the paintings are later recovered from their hiding place. Morse is not convinced by this confession and continues to investigate. The attic contains a photographic studio, and Lewis notices that the photographs in the style of Sir Julius's paintings – all of which feature female nudes – actually depict the au pair Michelle. This supports the theory that Sir Julius was being blackmailed. Lady Hanbury's alibi for the night of Sir Julius's death falls apart under Morse's questioning. She claims to have seen Plácido Domingo in Tosca in Covent Garden, but Morse knows this is not true, as he himself was in attendance and Domingo did not perform. She confesses that she has been having a long-term affair with McKendrick and that she confronted Sir Julius in his studio. She discovered the paintings of Michelle, there was a struggle, and she killed him in what she claims was self-defence. She had McKendrick cut the brake lines of Roger Meadows' car in response to his threats to sell the photographs to the tabloid press. Lady Hanbury, McKendrick, and Michelle are driven away in police cars, leaving the six-year-old daughter on the doorstep, while Morse decries the tragedy the girl has inherited.
9	2	"The Last Enemy"	James Scott	Peter Buckman	11 January 1989
Oxford academic Dr David Kerridge is believed to be missing, and a decapitated body is found in the local canal. Morse investigates, despite being encumbered by a toothache. Lewis establishes that the clothes on the body belong to Kerridge, but Kerridge is actually in London. Sir Alexander Reece, Master of Beaumont College, known to Morse from his university days, tells of a bad-tempered rivalry between Kerridge and Dr Arthur Drysdale. Recently diagnosed with brain cancer and with months to live, Drysdale has gone to Rome. Kerridge had gone to London to explore the possibility of a television appearance, but the invitation turned out to be a hoax. When he returns to his London flat after the meeting, he is attacked and killed. Lewis believes that the canal man is Nicholas Balarat, a senior civil servant and honorary fellow of Beaumont College, who had exchanged professional criticisms with Kerridge and has not been seen for five days. After a trip to Whitehall to enquire about Balarat, however, Morse believes the Kerridge connection is a cover. He explains to an exasperated Chief Superintendent Strange his theory that Reece had shot Balarat. Reece had nominated Balarat for the honorary fellowship, and Morse believes he expected Balarat to return the favour by recommending him as chairman in a new royal commission. When this did not occur, Morse believes, Reece exacted revenge and disposed of the body at Thrupp to implicate Kerridge. When the head of the canal man is found and is confirmed to be that of Balarat, the bullet wound in his skull supports Morse's theory that there are two murderers to be found. Before Morse can find any evidence of this, Reece himself is shot dead in his lodgings. Lewis had learned from a college scout that, not only did Drysdale have his disagreements with Kerridge, but also that Drysdale's wife had run off with Balarat. Soon Morse and Lewis catch up with Dysdale, who had not gone to Rome, and he confesses to the killings. Morse suspects that Dysdale's brain cancer removed any inhibition against settled old scores. Dysdale admits killing Balarat for his betrayal and Reece for blocking him from a prestigious academic post. But he claims to have failed in murdering Kerridge, who actually convinced Dysdale that he had not spoken against his receiving the position. Dysdale and Morse conclude that Reece must have killed Kerridge, as Morse originally suspected, since he knew about Reece's dishonesty and fear of being exposed. Based on Colin Dexter's novel The Riddle of the Third Mile.
10	3	"Deceived by Flight"	Anthony Simmons	Anthony Minghella	18 January 1989
Anthony Donn, Morse's college roommate from twenty years prior, comes to Oxford for an annual cricket match. He calls Morse to get together and talk. They eat chips on a bench, but Donn never tells Morse what is on his mind. Morse begins investigating a hate crime involving the fire bombing of a radical bookshop in which three people are killed. After leaving a message for Morse that he remembered what he wanted to tell him, Donn is found dead in his college lodging, appearing to have electrocuted himself. A gun is found in his luggage, but his wife says that he hated guns. Lewis postpones his leave to go undercover as a college porter and replaces Donn on the cricket team, the Clarets. Team member Vince Cranston resents this, as he does not consider Lewis a "gentleman". Lewis acquits himself well in the match between the Clarets and the Hearties, organised by another former college friend of Morse, Roly Marshall. Morse is present but sleeps through much of the match. During the cricket match, Peter Foster – who claims to be doing research in the college library – is found murdered in the changing rooms, stabbed in the chest with a pair of scissors. Previously, Lewis had seen Foster enter Donn's room. Morse confronts the woman staying with Foster, supposedly his wife Phillipa, and she admits that she is a customs investigator and that Peter is not her husband but her colleague. Over the previous two years, they have traced regular exports of cocaine and heroin from England to other European countries that correspond with the Clarets' tours. They had not told Morse, as he might have been involved. She persuades Morse to permit this year's tour to continue. When the tour bus arrives at Dover, it is searched, but nothing is found. Meanwhile, Morse has tailed Kate Donn and seen her passionately kissing Vince Cranston. Morse realises that, contrary to E. M. Forster's advice to "only connect", he has to delink the two killings. He discovers cocaine hidden in the seat of the wheelchair used by Clarets coach Roly Marshall and deduces that Jamie Jasper, Marshall's nephew, killed Foster. Jasper's job in international finance gave him the opportunity to obtain drugs in the Far East. Cranston had given Kate Donn a book with a florid dedication, leading Morse to suspect that she wanted to leave her husband for Cranston but her husband threatened to kill either Cranston or himself (hence the gun). Morse goes to the radio studio where Kate Donn is hosting her chat show and arrests her for murdering her husband. The action takes place during the Test match, with commentary by Brian Johnston, which annoys Morse because it deprives him of his usual music on BBC Radio 3.
11	4	"The Secret of Bay 5B"	Jim Goddard	Alma Cullen	25 January 1989
A murder at a multistorey car park uncovers a crime of passion involving a jealous husband, his wife, and her lover. The dead man was Michael Gifford, an architect, whose diary indicates he was meeting someone there. Lewis finds Gifford's house ransacked and is knocked unconscious by the intruder. He and Morse investigate Brian Pierce, an associate of Gifford's, who has a number of expensive paintings that he probably could not afford. The telephone number of an insurance company is found in Gifford's diary, but the company manager, Edward Manley, says Gifford does not have a policy with them. Morse meets Camilla, a London prostitute Gifford became possessive of, who says he sent her threatening letters and a tape when she ended their association. Morse and Lewis deduce Gifford had an affair with Rosemary Henderson, one of the insurance company's employees, and that her husband George found similar incriminating materials. Rosemary Henderson says that she and Gifford had their liaisons in the car park but she had broken it off and they were not due to meet that night. She has an alibi for the apparent time of the murder. An investigation of Gifford's finances show both he and Pierce were responsible for irregularities; Pierce had been stealing materials from the firm for private projects. Pierce commits suicide before the police can speak to him. Morse and Lewis visit George Henderson's forest cabin and find evidence that he was the one that broke into Gifford's house. Henderson is found shot dead in the woods nearby, possibly a suicide. Morse realises the parking ticket in Gifford's car could have been swapped for one with a later entrance time to disguise the time of death and give someone an alibi. Both Rosemary and Manley have solid alibis for the later time but are vague about where they were half an hour earlier. Morse proves Rosemary Henderson tried to cover up the fact Manley was at Henderson's cabin and that she and Manley were lovers. Manley admits he and Henderson fought after Henderson, having seen his wife go to the car park on the night in question, realised that she was involved in Gifford's murder. She had rung Manley to arrange an earlier meeting than the one in his diary. Manley claims the shotgun went off by accident as he and Henderson fought. Manley and Rosemary are both taken in for questioning. Based loosely on Colin Dexter's novel The Secret of Annexe 3.

=== Series 4 (1990) ===
No. overall	No. in series	Title	Directed by	Written by	Original release date
12	1	"The Infernal Serpent"	John Madden	Alma Cullen	3 January 1990
Environmentalist and senior fellow Dr Julian Dear is on his way to give a rare speech at an Oxford Union debate when he is attacked, later dying in hospital. Morse and Lewis are encouraged by Chief Superintendent Rennie to wrap up the case quickly because the cause of death was a heart attack and because Matthew Copley-Barnes, the Master of Beaufort college, is on the police oversight committee. The fractious relationship between the Master and his mentally fragile daughter and her husband becomes apparent when Sylvie Maxton, a newspaper columnist who used to live with the Master's family, arrives to stay with them. As Morse begins to question the family about Dr Dear, he finds that a series of unusual and disturbing packages has been arriving at the Master's lodge. Dr Jake Normington, whom Morse knows through musical connections, confides to Morse that Dr Dear had something important to say at the debate, and implies that he may have been stopped from doing so. After Morse departs, Normington and young man Mick McGovern listen to a tape in which Dear outlines his planned comments at the debate, which he stresses have "grave and far-reaching implications". Lewis is told by a college porter that Copley-Barnes has significantly increased the college investment income, particularly through CORBI, a chemical company that also funds Copley-Barnes' research. After Dear's funeral, the porter recognises McGovern as the young man he saw running out of the college around the time of the murder, so McGovern is brought in for questioning. At the same time, men are setting fire to McGovern's home. Normington leaves Oxford to return to his position in America, but leaves Morse a letter advising him to trust McGovern. McGovern remains silent until after his mother, who has been dying in the hospital, passes away. He insists that he did not attack Dr Dear and explains that he used to work for a subsidiary of CORBI and that he told Dr Dear about a cover-up – the company's promising new fertiliser was causing cancer. Dear was planning to disclose that information at the debate. Morse finds the Master dead in his lodge, and Sylvie Maxton reveals that he had sexually abused her as a child and that she sent the mysterious packages to remind him. The Master's daughter had been aware of her father's behaviour and confided in her mother, who killed her husband. Mrs Copley-Barnes prepares to throw herself from the chapel organ loft but is talked down by Morse and taken away. Forensics from the original crime scene leads Lewis to conclude that the culprit was the Beaufort College gardener, Phil Hopkirk. He had discovered that his daughter, who took piano lessons at the Copley-Barnes' home, was also being abused and attacked Dear while drunk, mistaking him for the Master.
13	2	"The Sins of the Fathers"	Peter Hammond	Jeremy Burnham	10 January 1990
Morse investigates a family brewery after the managing director, Trevor Radford, is found murdered. He had been working late preparing a defence against a takeover bid from a rival brewery, and his body was found in one of the vats. Family members and two Radfords directors, Norman Weekes and Victor Preece, would have benefited from the takeover. While both directors have alibis, that of Trevor's brother Stephen seems thin. Stephen is soon found murdered in an almost identical manner, prompting Trevor's widow, Helen, to confess to an affair with Stephen. Lewis's investigations into the brewery suggests that Trevor had been falsifying financial information in the company's books and that the financial situation is precarious. Trevor took out a one million pound loan three years earlier, which has not been repaid. It is later revealed that he had paid a surveyor to give an inflated value of the company's assets to secure this loan, a fraud that would have come to light if the takeover went through. The brewery’s board meets, led by the brothers' father Charles, and votes to reject the takeover bid, very much against the wishes of his wife Isobel. They appoint Weekes as the new managing director and task him with turning the business around. Solicitor Alfred Nelson, who had been anxious and flustered upon hearing the news of the Radford murders, is brutally murdered in his office. A folder on Nelson's desk is labelled "Knox", which Lewis discovers was the name of the brewery's original partner. Morse questions Charles and finds that Knox left Oxford in 1850 to avoid a scandal, but there's no evidence that he sold or otherwise gave up his share in the brewery. Lewis determines that Victor Preece is a descendant of Knox and remembers that he encountered Nelson when visiting Victor Preece's mother at her home. Victor Preece is arrested for murdering the Radford brothers as revenge for being swindled out of his inheritance, and his mother confirms the connection. His mother is arrested for murdering Nelson. But Morse realises that she was not the woman who called Nelson's office to set up an appointment. Nelson had been swindling the Preeces and was blackmailing Isobel Radford over the brewery ownership; she killed him in retaliation.
14	3	"Driven to Distraction"	Sandy Johnson	Anthony Minghella	17 January 1990
When two women are murdered in similar circumstances Morse, Lewis and Sergeant Maitland, an expert in violence against women, set out to catch the killer before he strikes again. Both of the deceased, Maureen Thomson and Jackie Thorn, owned cars, and attention turns to the local dealer where the cars were purchased and its owner Jeremy Boynton. After Jackie's neighbour, Angie Howe, is threatened by Boynton not to reveal his relationship with Jackie, she does so anyway, and he is arrested. Despite Morse's certainty that Boynton is the killer, he has no evidence against him, and Superintendent Strange steps in to have him released. Morse suggests to Tim Ablett, Jackie's boyfriend, that her unborn child may not be his. Learning that Boynton's been released, Ablett attacks him at his car showroom. While Boynton is taken to hospital, Morse seizes the opportunity to rifle through the company records in search of incriminating evidence against him. This outrages Lewis who refuses to be involved. After Morse and Maitland work through the night they finally have a breakthrough. Philippa Lau, who was attacked though not killed several years earlier, had previously bought a car from Boynton's. While another man is currently in prison for the attack, Lau receives a threatening phone call that seems to refer to the attack. Strange is not impressed and takes Morse off the case. The killer then strikes again, and since Boynton is in hospital, Morse's theory is finally disproved. Lewis and Maitland question Lau, who reveals that her driving instructor, Whittaker, had bought the car from Boynton's on her behalf. Lewis realises the car connection among the victims is Whittaker, not Boynton, and rushes to arrest him. Morse happens to be taking a driving lesson with Whittaker at the same time and makes the same realisation when he notices a roll of tape in the glove box. Whittaker confesses to acting out of twisted jealousy after his wife was hospitalised for a serious stroke. He attacks Morse with a knife as they drive at high speed, but after the ensuing struggle, it is Whittaker who is impaled on the knife when they come to a dramatic stop.
15	4	"Masonic Mysteries"	Danny Boyle	Julian Mitchell	24 January 1990
Morse, in his own words, becomes the hunted rather than the hunter, when he is framed for murder. The victim, Beryl Newsome, is an acquaintance of Morse. They are chorus members in a local production of The Magic Flute, the music of which recurs throughout the episode. After exchanging tense words with Morse on the way to dress rehearsal, Newsome receives a telephone call, during which she is stabbed. When Morse is first to find her body and picks up a knife lying beside her, he becomes the prime suspect and is suspended. DCI Bottomley is given the case with Lewis's assistance, and Morse is quick to point out Bottomley's Freemason connections. Fearing he has been set up, Morse takes Lewis to see his former chief inspector and mentor McNutt. Reviewing dangerous criminals put away by Morse who may want to frame him, McNutt suggests Hugo De Vries, whom he characterises as a "perverted genius" and "the greatest con man of the age". De Vries killed a guard when imprisoned in Sweden. When Morse returns to his car, he finds Masonic symbols scratched into it and then is stopped and breathalysed on the way home by an officer whom he knows and who also happens to be a Mason. Morse goes to see Marion Brooke, who worked with Newsome and was one of the victims of De Vries' fraud. She says she's been told that De Vries is dead and describes how large sums of money have been disappearing and reappearing in an account of the charity where she works. When Lewis reviews the account on the charity's computer, he finds that the money was deposited in Morse's bank account on the day Newsome was murdered. Morse visits his bank and has the money returned. Bottomley rules out Newsome's former husbands, and Swedish police records confirm that De Vries is dead. When he visits her flat, Bottomley finds a photo of Morse, along with items of his clothing, a completed Times crossword and his favorite beer. Morse is arrested, but when Bottomley and Lewis arrive to search Morse's house, they find music from the Magic Flute blaring from the sound system. They then discover the body of McNutt in the airing cupboard. When Bottomley discovers a record of a violent attack committed by Morse in the police computer records, Lewis suspects a computer hacker is behind the set-up. He disproves the record with an archive copy of the Oxford Mail, and Morse is released. His ordeal is not over, however, as he narrowly escapes a fire in his home that evening. His suspicions are confirmed when Swedish police confirm that De Vries is alive. He has absconded from parole after completing a degree in computer science. When Morse and Lewis try to follow up the now-missing Marion Brooke, an expensive type of wine in her kitchen confirms to Morse that she is De Vries' accomplice. After checking the shop that carries the wine, Morse and Lewis go to the home where the wine was delivered and come face to face with De Vries. He tells Morse that Brooke actually killed Newsome and was behind the manipulation of her charity's funds. After holding Morse at gunpoint, De Vries deceives him again and escapes in Lewis's car. He reunites with Brooke, but as police surround them, he shoots himself. Brooke confirms her complicity in De Vries' schemes and their shared desire for revenge against Morse, who was responsible for De Vries' imprisonment years before. The character of McNutt is referenced and Marion Brooke appears in episodes of Endeavour.

=== Series 5 (1991) ===
No. overall	No. in series	Title	Directed by	Written by	Original release date
16	1	"Second Time Around"	Adrian Shergold	Daniel Boyle	20 February 1991
Morse and Lewis attend a celebration for the retiring and recently honoured Deputy Assistant Commissioner Charlie Hillian OBE, who dies later the same evening after a break-in at his home. DCI Dawson, an old colleague of Morse, is keen to help with the investigation. Hillian was working on a book about his old cases with the help of eccentric writer Walter Majors, whom Morse visits at his chaotic home. Majors finds that one set of the notes Hillian had made for the book is missing – those on the unsolved case of a murdered child, Mary Lapsley, whose body had been discovered by Morse. Suspicions turn to a bookseller called Frederick Redpath, whose car was spotted outside Hillian's house on the day of the murder and who had a newsclip in his wallet about Hillian's book. When Dawson comes to the station to question Redpath, he immediately recognises him as Briers, a suspect in the Mary Lapsley case. Despite maintaining his innocence in both cases, a stance that Dawson accepts but Morse does not, Redpath attempts to take his own life in custody but survives. Morse takes the opportunity to question Redpath's daughter about the Lapsley case. She describes how her father was persecuted for five years. She and Mary had been good friends, and she maintains that her father was home with her when Mary was killed. She tells Morse that anyone could have known that her father owned the fishing knife that killed Mary, which he had lost a year earlier, and that when he went back to look for it, John Mitchell and his son Terrence were at the lake. Terrence is now Hillian's gardener and was already questioned about the break-in. His mother has become increasingly evasive as Morse and Lewis continue their enquiries. As the Lapsley case becomes central to the investigation, Dawson focuses on typed diary pages sent to police five years after the death as an apparent deathbed confession. They had been dismissed as a hoax by Hillian, a view that both Lewis and Morse maintain. Morse is more interested in asking why the identity of Mary's father was not properly investigated. He visits Mary's grandmother and borrows a picture of Mary and her mother sitting on what appears to be a man's jacket. The photo does not provide any useful information, but when he returns it, Mrs Lapsley shows him a badge that Mary's father had given her. Morse recognises it because he has one just like it. Lewis suspects that the missing John Mitchell was Mary's killer. Mitchell had access to office typewriters that could have been used for the diary pages, which could have been sent to stop the police investigation. Mitchell disappeared soon after the pages were received, walking out on his family. Lewis says they should put a trace on Mitchell, but Morse refuses. Morse asks Dawson to question Mrs Mitchell about John's whereabouts; but instead of doing so, Dawson dramatically barges into the Mitchell home and accuses her of knowing John was Mary's killer, which she confesses. Morse visits Redpath in hospital, and Redpath explains that Mitchell could not have killed Mary, as he was sick in bed at the time. Morse then confronts Terrence, who confesses to killing Mary by accident when he was only a child himself. His father found Terrence's diary years later and sent the typed extracts to suggest that the killer was about to die. Terrence broke into Hillian's house to retrieve the notes on Mary's case, and after a struggle, the drunken Hillian fell to the floor and incurred a fatal head injury. Morse and Lewis arrest Dawson for the murder of John Mitchell. He confirms Morse's suspicion that he was Mary's father and that he had killed John Mitchell after he confessed to killing Mary. What Dawson did not know was that John was covering for his son. Believing that any jail term Mitchell would serve would be insufficient, Dawson beat him to death and buried the body. He was behind the persecution of Redpath and, feeling guilty, wanted the case reopened to clear Redpath's name.
17	2	"Fat Chance"	Roy Battersby	Alma Cullen	27 February 1991
A young Oxford graduate student, Victoria Hazlett, dies during a theology exam. She had been injured falling off a bicycle, missed the original exam date, and was therefore taking the exam alone. She and Hilary Dobson were members of a Christian, female collective called Pax that run a house to support vulnerable women and are working towards the ordination of women. Dobson says that the bicycle was hers and that the brake cable had been deliberately cut. She is on the short list to become the college chaplain at St Saviour's and insists that the chaplaincy team, particularly Geoffrey Boyd, are to blame since they were vigorously opposed to having a female chaplain. She also believe that they are to blame for Hazlett's room being ransacked and her papers taken, covering years of academic work. Morse and Lewis cannot find Boyd. The cause of Hazlett's death is found to be a heart attack caused by a chemical reaction between the painkillers she was taking, the alcohol in the communion wine, and an unidentified substance. Hank Briardale, a pharmaceutical expert who takes a closer look at the results, determines that the substance is an amino acid that could have been present naturally. He is also a consultant to a local weight-loss programme called Think Thin. Morse gets to know another member of the Pax group, Emma Pickford, who seems amenable to his romantic advances. One of the women served by Pax, Dinah Newberry, is extremely upset about Hazlett's death and runs away from the house. She chaotically confronts various people, including a Mrs Gardam, who has been unsuccessfully trying to get Morse's attention at the police station. Lewis is waiting outside the Think Thin headquarters for his wife, who is attending a presentation, when Newberry attacks the program's leader Freddy Galt. Lewis recognises her, but by the time he gets out of his car, she has run away. Lewis interviews Gardham who tells him that Think Thin requires the winners of its "pound-shedder of the year" award – which both she and Newberry had won – to sign an agreement that they would never allow themselves to be publicly photographed if they regain weight. Newberry had been harassing her claiming she had photos she was going to give to the newspaper. Dobson receives the appointment as college chaplain. Morse receives results of a third analysis of the substance that reacted with Hazlett's painkillers, which finds it was a metabolic stimulant, not an amino acid. Morse and Lewis realise that Newberry had visited Hazlett during the night before Hazlett's death and brought her research materials and pills she had stolen from Briardale's lab, believing that the pills were dangerous. When Hazlett took a second painkiller dose during the night, she accidentally took the diet pills, and the chemical interaction caused her death the next day. As Morse and Lewis arrive at an event celebrating Think Thin's acquisition by an American company, Newberry confronts Galt with a knife but is halted in her attack by Pickford, with whom Morse reconciles as the episode ends.
18	3	"Who Killed Harry Field?"	Colin Gregg	Geoffrey Case	13 March 1991
The body of a local artist and restorer, Harry Field, is found dumped in woodland, and despite his wife's claim that he had left her a phone message just the other day, he seems to have died almost a week earlier. Morse and Lewis begin their questioning among Harry's drink-sodden friends, including Tony Doyle, a secondary school art teacher who had apparently been lending Field money. Several of Field's paintings seem to depict the same woman, whom Lewis manages to track down, but despite apparently being his muse, she is of little help with the case. Lewis also suspects that Doyle and Field's wife were having an affair, but Morse dismisses the thought that Doyle is a killer. After Field's motorcycle is found at a pub a short distance from a country estate, Morse connects a Latin phrase on the back of Field's final unfinished painting with the family that owns the manor, which was the subject of the painting. The current owner, Paul Eirl, is in the process of trying to sell the house and to lease some priceless, never-before-displayed artworks to the British government. An art expert friend of Morse's reveals that a portrait of Giovanni Bellini by Albrecht Dürer is the real jewel of the collection. After further conversations with Mrs Field, Morse begins to suspect that forgery, perhaps by Field, has played a part in his death. Then the prime suspect, Paul Eirl, is also found murdered. A recently burned-out hut on the estate and a disinfected car in Eirl's garage all but confirm his role in Field's murder, but his staff are uncooperative, so it cannot be proved. When Morse's art expert looks through the paintings in Field's studio, he tells Morse that one – a portrait of Mrs Field – is surely not by the same artist, as it is vastly superior in quality. Morse shrewdly deduces that the proud Field would own work by only an artist he genuinely respected and goes to see Field's father. Sure enough, Harry Field Sr reveals that he is the true artist of the family and confesses to forging the Dürer painting in Eirl's secretive collection, with the collusion of Eirl's father. He suggests that Eirl asked his son to restore it, but that Field Jr must have refused on principle and been murdered by Eirl in an ensuing struggle. Continuing the conversation down at the police station, Field Sr further confesses to killing Eirl in retaliation and insists that Eirl must have killed his son. But Field's theory may not be the whole story. Before the episode ends, Field's model turns up at the studio. She tells Morse that she had been to see Eirl, in response to his expressed desire to buy some of Field's work, but Eirl paid her to sleep with him instead. She believes that Harry had ridden to see Eirl in a jealous rage the night he died, and so the exact circumstances behind Field's death are left ambiguous.
19	4	"Greeks Bearing Gifts"	Adrian Shergold	Peter Nichols	20 March 1991
Morse and Lewis investigate the murder of Nicos Capparis, a chef from a local Greek restaurant, with not much to go on other than a few photographs. One shows a family with a baby and another an impressive Greek ship. Morse meets an expert in ancient Greek naval architecture, Randall Rees, at a university function. Rees mentions a TV programme that he had recently done, which Lewis happens to have taped, about a reconstruction of an ancient Trireme. Rees's wife, Friday, whom Morse also meets, is a famous TV personality. The Trireme project has direct connections to the murder, as the restaurant's owner, Basilios Vasilakis, is trying to prevent the ship's being brought to Britain. The man behind that scheme is Digby Tuckerman, whom Nicos worked for previously and who seems to have emerged unscathed from a series of failed business ventures. His alibi for the evening in question seems flimsy. Meanwhile, the couple with whom Nicos lodged, Mr and Mrs Papas, are unhelpful, despite the efforts of a translator. Their son, Dino, seems equally evasive, giving the impression they have something to hide. Nicos's sister, Maria Capparis, arrives from Greece for the funeral, but despite bringing her newborn from Greece, goes missing after giving the translator the slip while out shopping. Because of her disappearance, Dino reluctantly reveals that her baby was fathered by a married man who lives in England, a secret Nicos was aware of before his untimely death. Watching Lewis's recording of the TV programme, Morse spots Rees and Vasilakis at the taverna in Piraeus, Greece that Nicos had owned and where Maria worked. Tuckerman was in Piraeus at the same time, so any one of them could have fathered Maria's child or have other reasons to want Nicos dead. The case is complicated when the baby is snatched from the care of Mr and Mrs Papas, and soon after, Maria's body is found in the river, killed in a similar manner to her brother. Morse puts pressure on Tuckerman, who reacts angrily and storms off to confront Vasilakis with a knife. But Vasilakis coolly disarms him and has him arrested. Reviewing the TV programme once more, Morse connects the seemingly perfect but childless marriage of Randall and Friday Rees with the missing baby and turns up unannounced at their house. Sure enough, Friday is holding the baby and confirms Morse's theory by explaining that Randall fathered the child with Maria and that he killed both her and Nicos. But first Randall and then Lewis and the translator arrive, revealing that Friday committed the murders and took the baby, fuelled by her jealousy and desperation to have a child of her own. As Lewis closes in on her from behind, Friday darts away and falls over the bannister to her death, with Lewis catching the baby from her arms. As the episode concludes, Morse gloomily reflects by quoting Virgil, the baby presumably the Greek "gift" that innocently brought tragedy to everyone involved. (Note: This episode caused a question to be raised in Parliament by Lord Jenkins of Putney regarding the legality of employing a baby in a TV programme, and how it was induced to cry at the right moment.)
20	5	"Promised Land"	John Madden	Julian Mitchell	27 March 1991
A criminal named Peter Matthews dies of AIDS in prison, prompting an inquiry into his case. Morse believes that Kenny Stone, an informant who helped convict Matthews, held back information from his story. Stone has been relocated to Australia, and Morse and Lewis travel there to follow up, hoping to firm up the evidence and prevent the release of other members from Matthews' Oxford gang. When they reach New South Wales, Stone, now named Mike Harding, is missing. His mother-in-law's room at her care home has been ransacked, and she is hospitalised. Harding's wife Anne does not welcome their presence, and Morse and Lewis believe she is lying about not knowing where he is. Morse tells police officer Scott Humphries, who responds to the attack, that he is a private detective whose client is considering leaving money to Harding, but makes little progress. Lewis soon realises the Oxford mobsters looking for Harding located his whereabouts through the mother-in-law's subscription to an Oxford newspaper. When the Hardings' daughter, Karen, is kidnapped, Anne's mother dies from the shock of the earlier attack, and Anne goes to the police, Morse and Lewis explain who they are, but they are told they are not authorised to conduct an investigation locally. Harding's oldest son Dave, who had previously told Morse he did not know where his father is, now tells him his father recently called him and he thinks that Harding might be in a caravan he owns. When the two of them arrive at the caravan, they find Harding is dead, an apparent suicide. Morse and Lewis speculate that Harding killed himself either because he expected to be found out or because Anne was having an affair with Humphries. Anne admits that Harding's original evidence against Peter Matthews was false and that, in that instance, Matthews was innocent. Karen's kidnapper makes contact again, demanding to see Harding. Morse tells him he will bring Harding and sets up a meeting. Morse and Lewis realise that the kidnapper is Paul Matthews, Peter's younger brother. Feeling responsible for having helped convict Peter and for the two subsequent deaths, Morse goes to the meeting unarmed and attempts to save Karen by offering his life in exchange. When Morse's attempts to reason with Paul are unsuccessful, Anne runs out of hiding to rescue her daughter. Humphries tries to stop her but is shot by Paul, who then is then killed by a police marksman. Anne agrees to return to England to set the record straight.

=== Series 6 (1992) ===
No. overall	No. in series	Title	Directed by	Written by	Original release date
21	1	"Dead on Time"	John Madden	Daniel Boyle	26 February 1992
Morse comes face-to-face with the woman to whom he was once engaged, Susan Fallon, when her husband is found shot dead at their home. The dead man, Henry Fallon, suffered from a neurodegenerative illness; and the assumption, confirmed at the inquest, is that he committed suicide. It is only when his doctor, John Marriat, returns from holiday to inform Morse that he would have been incapable of holding the gun to his head and pulling the trigger, given his condition, that suspicions turn to Fallon's son-in-law, Peter Rhodes. Rhodes claims to have arrived at the house at 6pm and found Fallon's body, immediately alerting the police, but this was only minutes after Fallon's nurse had left, after waving goodbye to Fallon through the window. He also claims that Fallon had called him at 3pm the same day to arrange the meeting, but according to the nurse, the phone line had been out all day and reconnected only just after 5pm. Since his story does not stack up, Morse charges Rhodes with murder. However, Morse cannot navigate the case objectively, as he attempts to rekindle a relationship with Susan Fallon, who is tentative but amenable and encouraged into it by her brother, William Bryce-Morgan. Meanwhile the doctor's wife, Helen Marriat, reaches out to Morse and tries to persuade him of Rhodes' innocence but offers no evidence. As Rhodes continues to protest his innocence, Lewis begins to believe him. The detectives realise that someone could have slipped out of the house before Rhodes found the body. Morse turns his attention to the deaths of Rhodes' wife Henrietta and their child, the Fallons' daughter and grandson, some years before. Injuries to Helen Marriat's hand lead Morse to suspect she was involved somehow. After he confronts her, she confesses the truth. She had been having an affair with Rhodes, who had promised to leave his wife. One night Henrietta called the cottage where the lovers had been drinking, and Helen taunted her. Henrietta arrived with her son, enraged; and Rhodes insisted on accompanying them home. The drunken Rhodes tried to make her stop the car, causing it to swerve off the road and overturn. He escaped with Helen's help, but Henrietta and her son died when the car exploded in flames. Since John Marriat knew of this, Morse suspects he told Henry Fallon, who then planned to use his suicide to set up Rhodes and get revenge for their deaths. Morse still can’t see it straight though and jumps to the conclusion that Marriat, an advocate of euthanasia, assisted Fallon in killing himself, firing the fatal shot with his consent. Lewis gets permission from Strange to investigate the possibility Susan was involved, which has not occurred to Morse. He visits the Fallons' London flat, where Susan supposedly was at the time of Henry's death, and finds an answerphone message from Henry pretending to speak to Susan, a call that she had claimed to have received and constituted her alibi. Susan's involvement is confirmed by her decision to take her own life. Despite being a euthanasia advocate, Marriat tries to dissuade her, but she insists that she must keep her promise to her husband – essentially a suicide pact – and keep Morse from finding the truth. Morse is heartbroken over Susan once again and remains convinced Marriat was involved but is unable to prove it or get a confession from him. Out of kindness to Morse, Lewis throws away the incriminating answerphone cassette tape, allowing Morse to continue to believe Susan had nothing to do with her husband's death.
22	2	"Happy Families"	Adrian Shergold	Daniel Boyle	11 March 1992
Sir John Balcombe, a leading industrialist and member of one of the country's richest and most powerful families, is discovered murdered in his palatial home. His widow, Lady Emily, is aloof and his sons, Harry and James, bicker childishly, none of them appearing to be affected by Sir John's death. The murder weapon, a stonemason's hammer, is found in the moat around the house. The only other clue is a pen, made in Montreal, that was in Sir John's hand. Back at the station, Morse has to answer to Superintendent Holdsby, covering for Strange who is on leave. Very keen to enhance his reputation, Holdsby courts the press, but soon a tabloid makes Morse the story, much to his annoyance. Morse and Lewis speak with those connected to the family including two friends of Lady Emily. Margaret Cliff stays on the estate a few weeks a year and has care of a troubled teenager called Jessica. Alfred Rydale is Lady Emily's personal lawyer and initially misleads them into thinking the Balcombes were considering taking their company public, which set the brothers at odds with each other. Morse's Oxford connections, Lewis's diligent police work and more accurate information from Rydale establish a slightly different story, which involves underhand dealings by James that led to his removal from the company. When Harry is found dead soon after, suspicions for both murders fall on James. When Morse surprises him with the detail of the initials "SF" on the chisel that was stuck into Harry, James becomes extremely agitated, and Morse begins to suspect there might be another story that has yet to be revealed. James is then killed too, shot out on the estate at night, and despite Morse's discovery of a skeletal body buried in the same location, Holdsby takes him off the case. A resentful Morse attends the police station fête and casually picks up a book written by Margaret Cliff. When he reads that she studied for her doctorate in Montreal, and not at Cambridge as she told him, he suddenly realises her connection to the killings. The buried man was her brother, Stephen Ford, who had gone missing 20 years ago when working for the Balcombes. She learned that he had been Lady Emily's lover, had fathered her daughter, and that the Balcombe men had killed him as a result. Margaret enacted revenge by killing the three of them in turn. She had needed Lady Emily's help, however, and so lied to make her believe that Jessica was her daughter. Lady Emily's child had in fact died soon after birth, a reality Lady Emily never fully accepted. This deception has tragic consequences, as Lady Emily cannot keep this secret from Jessica. When she reveals it, Jessica – who hates the mother who gave her up for adoption – stabs her to death, completing the destruction of the entire Balcombe family.
23	3	"The Death of the Self"	Colin Gregg	Alma Cullen	25 March 1992
Morse and Lewis investigate the apparently accidental death of a wealthy tourist in Italy and uncover an antiquities' smuggling racket. Author May Lawrence was found dead after being impaled on a spike protruding from a tree. The Italian police considered it an accident, but at an inquest back in Oxford, her husband Kenneth – who was in England at the time of her death – spoke of receiving threats. Since Lawrence returned to Italy before the inquest is completed, Morse and Lewis are sent after him. May was attending a self-improvement course run by Russell Clark, whom Morse once had jailed for fraud and whom Morse blames for the suicide of a witness against him. Lewis discovers the local police chief, Battisti, already has Lawrence under surveillance. Morse befriends Nicole Burgess, an opera singer who had a breakdown and was one of Clark's clients, and learns from Clark's assistant Maureen Dyson that May was having an affair with another member of the course. Lewis works out it was Andreas Heller, who disappeared in the aftermath. The Italian police track down Heller, whose real name is Louis Picard, but he has an alibi for May's death. Lewis learns two other attendees, Alistair and Judith Haines, already knew May and that she wrote an unflattering caricature of them in one of her novels. Clark goads Judith into committing suicide to end Morse's investigation. Alistair had signed up to the course to try to shame May. Both he and Judith believed the other had killed May, but her death really was an accident. Lewis learns someone removed from police evidence the remains of the item that Nicole burned in a ritual – part of calligraphy manuscript made by her estranged husband, Guido Ventura. Morse is knocked out after finding a similar manuscript at the couple's house. Battisti fills in Morse on his investigation. Clark, Lawrence and Ventura sold a genuine Renaissance manuscript to a buyer in the UK – a sale in violation of Italian law – and are now trying to sell him a forged one. Morse works out that the manuscript is hidden inside a mirror that another attendee, Patti Wilcox, bought from Lawrence, and Clark's assistant Maureen was meant to retrieve it when they both went to the USA. The three men are arrested; Lawrence had wrongly believed that May's death was a threat against him. Morse and Lewis attend Nicole's successful comeback appearance.
24	4	"Absolute Conviction"	Antonia Bird	John Brown	8 April 1992
Lawrence Cryer, convicted of real estate fraud, is found dead in a cell at Farnleigh minimum security prison, having had a massive heart attack after a beating. Morse, Lewis and D.S. Cheetham question inmates, including Cryer's former partners, Alex Bailey and Brian Thornton, who are also incarcerated at Farnleigh, some victims of the fraud, and the Farnleigh governor, Hillary Stevens. Morse is surprised to see Charlie Bennett, who was incarcerated for murdering his wife, at Farnleigh. Bennett has spent sixteen years in prison but maintains his innocence, saying a man called Harold Manners was the real killer. Morse and Cheetham are both convinced the fraudsters have money hidden in overseas bank accounts. Cryer's wife Emma and Thornton's son Peter have been visiting the prison, possibly trying to find the hidden money. Cheetham uses an unauthorised phone tap to learn that Bailey was in frequent contact with Ronald Sherman, a financial adviser. Hilary Stevens admits that three syringes were stolen from the prison dispensary, one of which Thornton found by Cryer's body, and that Cryer told the prison doctor that some of his heart medication digoxin was missing. Bailey is hospitalised after receiving an overdose of digoxin. Thornton reveals that the missing money is in a Liechtenstein bank account and the three men each had a part of the set of numbers needed to access it. Thornton argues that he would not kill the others since he needed their numbers, but Morse is convinced that he killed Cryer and tried to kill Bailey. Lewis discovers that Bailey's digoxin overdose was put into some chocolates his wife sent him. Lewis had given the chocolates to prison guard Geoff Harris to pass on to Bailey. Harris's stepmother was a victim of the fraud, and it appears that he has been sending threatening letters to Bailey. Harris admits the letters but denies the poisoning. He mentions that Charlie Bennett had attacked Sherman when he visited Bailey. Morse realises "Ronald Sherman" is an anagram of "Harold Manners" and Bennett recognised the man as his wife's killer. Morse and Lewis catch up with Bennett, on day release, but he has killed Sherman using one of the syringes. Bennett says Sherman/Manners killed his wife when she refused to participate in an investment scheme. He told Bailey what Sherman/Manners had done, but Bailey dismissed it, so Bennett tried to kill him by injecting digoxin into the chocolates. He killed Cryer when Cryer caught him with the syringe in Bailey's cell, struggling with Cryer and causing Cryer's heart attack. He is resigned to spending the rest of his life in prison.
25	5	"Cherubim and Seraphim"	Danny Boyle	Julian Mitchell	15 April 1992
Teen suicides, one of which is Morse's niece, are being linked to the local rave scene. Morse takes leave to unofficially investigate his niece Marilyn's death. She took a large overdose without explanation. As part of his preparation for the inspector exam, Lewis is temporarily assigned to another inspector, DCI Holroyd, who works strictly by the book. They investigate the disappearance of teen Jacko Leaver, who turns out to have walked in front of a train. Holroyd believes he was being abused by his father but Lewis dismisses the idea. Morse speaks to Marilyn's best friend, Vicky Wilson, but she offers no explanation. He visits the Samaritans and learns of a third abrupt teen suicide. Morse's stepmother, Gwen, is being given an experimental anti-dementia treatment by Desmond Collier, which he is trying to get funding for. Vicky runs away to her older boyfriend, Charlie Paget, the DJ at the parties. Morse and Lewis realise Marilyn and Vicky went to an all-night party together, both claiming to be staying with the other. They meet local disco manager, Mike Bristowe, who talks about the safe drugs taken at parties. Bristowe confronts Collier who is selling his medication, seraphics, as a mood enhancing drug called seraphim. Morse and Lewis liaise with DS Haines from Drug Squad, who explains raves are organised as private parties and they can do nothing unless they see drugs being taken. Morse, Lewis and pathologist Doctor Hayward trace a drug found on Jacko to Collier, who says they could have been stolen while his lab was unlocked and they would create a clear-headedness if taken by young people. Hayward confirms all three teens took the drug. Collier tells Charlie to organise another rave. Bristowe anonymously tips off the police. Lewis realises Jacko's radio is tuned into a station that gives the rendezvous point. He and Morse, accompanied by Drug Squad, sneak into the rave. Morse sees Collier and pursues him, while Haines shuts down the dealers ad Lewis secures Vicky. Collier is stopped by a road block; he drives into a tree and is killed. Morse concludes the euphoric effects of the drug made the teens think they had already experienced everything there was and had no reason to go on living.

=== Series 7 (1993) ===
No. overall	No. in series	Title	Directed by	Written by	Original release date
26	1	"Deadly Slumber"	Stuart Orme	Daniel Boyle	6 January 1993
Mathew Brewster, surgeon and owner of a private clinic, is found dead in his garage with the car engine running. The pathologist determines that he was murdered. Morse and Lewis question the dead man's wife, Claire and son, John. John Brewster brings in a set of anonymous threatening letters sent to his father, made from words clipped from newspapers and magazines. He tells Morse and Lewis that a young woman named Avril Steppings was declared brain dead after undergoing a simple surgery at the clinic and her father Michael had threatened the clinic staff. Morse meets with Steppings and accompanies him to the hospital where his daughter is on life support. Morse then meets with Wendy Hazlitt, a former clinic nurse who was in the operating room during Avril Steppings' operation. She was also threatened by Steppings at the trial. Although she now works at the hospital where Avril is cared for, she purposely stays away from both the girl and her father. Forensic examination of the threatening letters finds evidence that they were sent by Steppings, which he admits, although he denies adding the words "I am going to kill you" to one of the letters. Steppings is taken in for questioning but is released when Morse is able to confirm his alibi for the time of the murder. Steppings tells Morse that his barrister hired a private investigator, who found that Mathew Brewster and Wendy Hazlitt were having an affair. Claire Brewster confirms this, contending that the affair ended two years ago, but Hazlitt tells Lewis that Mathew was going to leave his wife. Hazlitt tells Lewis that John Brewster knew of the affair and of Mathew's plan to leave Claire. Further examination of the letter reveals that the death threat was added to the original note separately. They find an aqualung – which Mathew's killer would have needed to survive the poisonous atmosphere in the garage – and other incriminating materials in the diving club locker of John's girlfriend. John admits killing his father and asks Morse to deliver the news to Claire Brewster. She refuses to believe it and she collapses with a massive heart attack. Morse notices some inconsistencies in John's taped statement, leading him to believe that someone else carried out the murder. Checking with John's girlfriend confirms he could not have used that aqualung, as it was not working. Lewis discovers that Steppings' accusations of medical incompetence against the Brewsters were correct. Claire Brewster's worsening heart disease led to her frequently taking breaks from work, and Mathew Brewster would let the unqualified Hazlitt act as anaesthetist in her place. On the day of Avril Stebbings' operation, Hazlitt administered the incorrect anaesthetic dose, leading to cardiac arrest and brain damage. When Mathew Brewster ended the affair with Hazlitt after everything she had done for him, she decided on revenge. She confessed to Steppings that his daughter's operation was mishandled. Hazlitt and Steppings drew up a plan to murder Mathew Brewster. They told John that if he did not help them, they would bring up other cases in which Hazlitt covered for Claire, and he cooperated in an effort to spare his mother. Steppings committed the murder, but arranged it so John had no alibi. Hazlitt provided Steppings with a false alibi. John was told that if he did not confess to killing his father, they would subject his mother to another trial and possible imprisonment. John Brewster is released, but Claire Brewster dies in the hospital. Steppings is found murdered in his own garage, and a letter to Morse is found in his car. John Brewster admits killing Steppings to keep him from leaving the country. Steppings' letter had told Morse that his ex-wife would look after their daughter, which she does by having the life support switched off.
27	2	"The Day of the Devil"	Stephen Whittaker	Daniel Boyle	13 January 1993
John Peter Barrie, a devil worshipper and convicted rapist, escapes from the infirmary of a prison for the criminally insane. He eludes authorities with several disguises and Morse and Lewis begin a manhunt. They question his prison therapist, Dr Esther Martin, and a priest named Humphrey Appleton, who is an expert in the occult. These two provide Morse and Lewis with information on Barrie's state of mind, while Martin explains that Barrie's occult obsession led him to believe she was a medium for a female demon. Barrie confronts Appleton in his church and asks him to bring Morse to meet him. Over the phone he demands that Martin be brought to Oxford. When Morse refuses, Barrie abducts Holly Trevors, wife of Steven Trevors, a painter working for an Oxford college. A plan to capture Barrie when he releases her at an agreed-upon location fails, but he does release her at Appleton's church. Lewis visits a nearby occult bookshop, where he finds that one of their regular customers is the Oxford official who hired Steven Trevors. Morse deduces that Barrie has a van, but no vans have been reported stolen since his escape. This, along with the observation that Barrie's disguises involve theatrical make-up, lead Morse to believe that someone is helping Barrie. On Lammas Day, a pagan day of ritual fire, a group of devil-worshippers, including the Oxford official and his solicitor, are celebrating a Black Mass when they are suddenly surrounded by a ring of fire. A figure wearing a horned goat mask approaches and walks through the flames. The next day Steven Trevors' burned body is found at the site. His fingerprints link him to earlier rapes by two men, the other of whom was Barrie. Disguised as a woman, Barrie forces his way into Holly Trevors' home. She shoots him and rushes to the police station to report it, but when she returns with Morse and Lewis they find that he has left with the gun. Items in her jewelry box were taken from women assaulted by Trevors and Barrie. She admits that they forced her to help them with the assaults and robberies. An inscription on one of the stolen items leads them back to Dr. Martin, the original victim. Barrie is hiding at a house where Martin is staying. He staggers out, demanding to speak to Morse, and raises a gun that Martin gave him. Nothing happens when he pulls the trigger, as Martin had removed the bullets, and Barrie is shot dead by an officer. Martin admits being assaulted by Barrie and Trevors, describes how she recognised Barrie when he was originally arrested, and outlines her complex plan leading to the deaths of both men.
28	3	"Twilight of the Gods"	Herbert Wise	Julian Mitchell	20 January 1993
Neville Grimshaw, a freelance investigative journalist, is found shot dead on the banks of the Isis River. He was in Oxford to write an article about businessman Andrew Baydon, the prospective major benefactor of a new Oxford college. Imperious Welsh opera diva Gwladys Probert is staying with Baydon before both of them receive honorary degrees from the university. During the academic procession before the ceremony, Probert is shot by a sniper, which is witnessed by Morse and Lewis. She survives but is critically injured. Morse insists to Strange that he be allowed to investigate the Probert shooting, even though he and Lewis are also covering the Grimshaw case. Not only did Morse see the shooting, but he is familiar with both Probert's world of opera and with the workings of Oxford colleges. Interviewing members of Probert's retinue gives Morse and Lewis a rather inconsistent portrait of the singer. The disappearance of her young sister Mari, who travels with her, raises some concern until she shows up at the hospital. She has reunited with her boyfriend, with whom her sister was also interested, and is now carrying his child. Reviewing the notes found in Grimshaw's hotel room, Lewis finds the connection between the two shootings. Baydon, known to be a survivor of a Nazi concentration camp in Lithuania, was actually a collaborator and guard. Morse suspects that he ordered the killing of Grimshaw and realises that the Oxford shooter may have unintentionally shot Probert whilst attempting to kill Baydon. A gun is found hidden in the Bodleian Library, from which the shot was fired, and a librarian tells Morse of a Lithuanian researcher, Victor Ignotas, who has been working in that part of the library. Ignotas is a survivor of the same concentration camp where Baydon was employed, and he admits telling his experiences to Baydon's son, who was using an assumed name, and to Grimshaw. The newspaper Grimshaw had submitted his article to had refused to print it. Ignotas's fingerprints are found on the gun, and he expresses regret at hitting Probert instead. Lewis learns that a different gun was used to shoot Grimshaw. Morse and Lewis arrest Baydon and his security officer Williams for the murder of Grimshaw. Probert begins recovering from her injuries.

=== Series 8 (1995–2000) ===
No. overall	No. in series	Title	Directed by	Written by	Original release date
29	1	"The Way Through the Woods"	John Madden	Russell Lewis	29 November 1995
Stephen Parnell, who confessed to murdering five people and is due to stand trial, is killed in prison. In his dying words, he claims that he did not kill the last victim, Karen Anderson. The murders were investigated the previous summer by DCI Martin Johnson and Lewis, since Morse was on leave; but Anderson's body has never been found and there are several differences between her death and Parnell's other murders. Morse becomes convinced that Johnson overlooked key evidence and that Karen Anderson's body has been buried in Wytham Woods and not in Blenheim Lake, as Parnell had stated in his confession. Morse questions George Daley, who works at Blenheim and found Anderson's overnight bag there a week after she disappeared. A confrontation breaks out among CS Strange, Morse and Johnson about the disappearance of Anderson and Parnell's retraction of his confession. Then Daley is found shot dead in one of the gardens at Blenheim Palace, and Morse is put in charge, since Strange feels that Johnson may have cut corners in the original investigation. Morse and Lewis interview Dr Alan Hardinge, the bursar of Lonsdale College, where Daley also worked; Dave Michaels, the head forester of Wytham Woods; and Margaret and Philip Daley, the wife and son of George Daley. When they question the Daleys, they find that Daley had kept Anderson's camera, which was next to her bag. Mrs Daley initially claims the film in the camera was burned, but Philip comes forward with the photos that were developed. Lewis identifies the location in one of the photos as Park Town, which leads them to osteopath Alisdair McBryde. He identifies a man in one of the photos as Dr James Myton, a former patient. McBryde admits that he and Myton were both interested in taking nude photos of women, and they hired Anderson as a model. When they heard that Parnell had been arrested for her murder, they decided not to come forward and burned the photos they had taken. Back at Lonsdale, Morse and Lewis again question Hardinge, who was another of McBryde's patients. McBryde had told them that, on the day of Anderson's disappearance, she had left with Hardinge and Myton, but Hardinge claims he was dropped off first. Myton appears to have fled the country midway through his rental of a local flat. He left behind a number of framed pictures, one of which duplicates a postcard found in Anderson's bag that shows a scene in Wytham Woods. Morse convinces Strange to let him search Wytham Woods, and when the search turns up some skeletal remains, Morse is convinced that Karen Anderson has been found. New pathologist Laura Hobson discovers that the remains are actually those of a man, whose head was bashed in. Initials on his watch indicate the body is Myton's. An angered Strange reassigns the Daley case to Johnson, who arrests Daley's son Phillip. Mrs Daley tells Morse her husband was obsessed with Parnell's murders and there were other photos from Anderson's camera, showing her nude in the woods, which she destroyed. Hardinge admits to Morse that he had left Myton and Anderson in Wytham, and when he went back the next day, he found Myton's body and departed in horror. Pursuing an idea of Morse's, Lewis discovers that the outstanding rent on Myton's flat, now known to have been paid after his death, was paid by forester Dave Michaels; and Morse, viewing a security video showing Daley at a local petrol station, is surprised to see Michaels' wife Cathy there right after Daley. Her fingerprint was found inside Anderson's camera, and she has a record for shooting her father at 15. Lewis is questioning Dave Michaels when Cathy pulls a gun on him. She actually is Karen Anderson and killed Myton in self-defence when he tried to rape her. Dave found her in the woods, buried Myton's body and dumped her bag. Daley had followed Cathy home and made advances, so she shot him, dragged him into his van and dumped the body at Blenheim. As Dave tries to reason with her, the gun goes off and he is killed. She forces Lewis to take the body into the woods and dig a grave. When Morse interrupts her, she says that she killed her father because he sexually abused her. When Morse tells her to shoot him, Lewis yells, drawing her attention, and Morse hits the shotgun from her hands with the shovel. As she drops the gun, it goes off, killing her.
30	2	"The Daughters of Cain"	Herbert Wise	Julian Mitchell	27 November 1996
Dr Felix McClure, a retired Oxford don, is found stabbed to death in his apartment. The phone number of "K" is found among McClure's notes. Morse and Lewis begin investigating McClure's college associates and students. These include Ted Brooks, his former scout, who was sacked by McClure for apparent drug dealing; Matthew Rodway, a student who died in questionable circumstances; and Ashley Davies, another student and friend of Rodway, who trains racehorses at Seven Barrows near Lambourn. Son of a very rich man, Davies was rusticated by McClure for a violent fight with Rodway and decided not to return to the university. They discover that Ted Brooks, recently hospitalised after a heart attack, has physically and emotionally abused his wife, Brenda, for years. Brenda's daughter, Kay, who is a high-class escort and is engaged to Ashley, was also abused by Ted, her stepfather, when she lived at home. She is the "K" in Felix's notes, and Morse interviews her about her relationships with Felix, Ted and Davies. Morse also questions Julia Stevens, a school teacher, employer and very close friend of Brenda's, who is dying of a brain tumour. She tells him that Brenda maintains her loyalty to her husband, dispute his abuse of both her and Kay. Morse thinks Davies could have killed both Rodway – who was under the influence of drugs when he jumped or fell out of a window – and McClure because of jealousy over Kay. But Davies tells Lewis that Rodway was his best friend and he was in South Africa when Rodway died. He mentions that McClure met Kay when he came to investigate the fight between Davies and Rodway but that his interest in her was just paternal. He has no alibi for the time when McClure was killed. Morse suspects Ted Brooks killed McClure because he had discovered Ted was selling drugs to the students again. But before he can be brought in for questioning, Ted disappears from his home, and his body is found in a nearby river. He was stabbed with an antique knife stolen the night before from the museum where he worked. The knife resembles what would have been used to kill McClure, and Ted could have taken it out himself and returned it after stabbing McClure. But he was hospitalised soon after McClure's death, so it appears that the damage to the knife's case done the previous night was to disguise when it was actually taken. Brenda Brooks confesses to destroying evidence that incriminated her husband in the death of McClure. Morse is convinced that Kay, Brenda and Julia Stevens were involved in Ted's disappearance and murder. Stevens collapses when being interviewed by Lewis, and when Morse comes to see her in hospital, because of her tumor all she can say are lines from Macbeth, most of which relate to the murder of Duncan. She had given Brenda a letter that is given to Morse after her death, in which she says she killed Ted on her own. But Morse and particularly Lewis are discouraged when it is decided not to search for additional accomplices in Ted's death.
31	3	"Death Is Now My Neighbour"	Charles Beeson	Julian Mitchell	19 November 1997
Rachel James, a physiotherapist, is shot through a window of her home one morning. Morse and Lewis begin the investigation by interviewing Rachel's neighbours, along with the staff at the clinic where she worked. One of the neighbours, Adele Cecil, tells Morse that Rachel was having an affair with Julian Storrs, a professor at Lonsdale College. Storrs and Denis Cornford are both vying to be Master of Lonsdale College, replacing Sir Clixby Bream who is about to retire. Morse interviews Storrs, who admits the affair but adds that that Denis Cornford and Adele Cecil were lovers before Cornford's marriage. Sir Clixby propositions Cornford's young wife Shelly, telling her that if she does not give in, he will make sure her husband does not get appointed as Master. She orders him to leave their home. The following morning, Rachel's next-door neighbour, reporter Geoffrey Owens, is found shot dead in his house, possibly with the same gun, although there are no signs of a break-in. Morse notices that there is no house on the street with the address number 13. He surmises that this caused the murderer to count the house numbers incorrectly, killing Rachel James instead of Owens. He also discovers that Owens was blackmailing several powerful people, and finds a cryptic page among Owens' papers. Owens' files also contain coverage of a case in which housewife Alice Martin and her daughter Debra shot Alice's husband, a wealthy businessman, and burned him on his yacht because he was going to run off with a younger woman. Morse finds out that Alice and Debra Martin changed their names to Angela and Diane Cullingham and that Angela Cullingham subsequently married Julian Storrs. But Lewis confirms that the Storrs were in Bath for a conference the morning of Owens' death. Sir Clixby once again meets with Shelly Cornford, threatening to prevent her husband's appointment as Master, and she reluctantly gives in to his demands. After, she is devastated when Sir Clixby tells her that Cornford was responsible for breaking up his marriage, and that he would never support his bid to be Master. When Morse and Lewis meet with Sir Clixby, he denies any possibility of being blackmailed by Owens and speaks disparagingly about Shelly Cornford. Meanwhile, she confronts her husband about Sir Clixby's claim. When Cornford realises what she did, he furiously chases her into the hall, where she falls downstairs and is fatally injured. Her stunned and remorseful husband withdraws his candidacy and resigns his fellowship at Lonsdale. The next day Morse and Lewis travel to Bath to interview the staff of the hotel where the Storrs have been staying. They discover evidence that Angela Storrs' daughter Diane Cullingham was the women staying in Julian Storrs' room on the morning Owens was killed, invalidating Angela's alibi. Angela Storrs is arrested for the murder of Geoffrey Owens, who was blackmailing her, and for accidentally killing Rachel James. Back at Lonsdale, Morse and Lewis inform Sir Clixby Bream that both candidates had withdrawn their candidacy for Master, and when he states he plans to stay in his position, Morse threatens to make Sir Clixby's role in Shelly Cornford's death known to the press. Morse and Lewis meet Adele Cecil at the pub later. She had originally challenged him to tell her his first name, and he had given her a crossword clue: "My whole life's effort has revolved around eve, nine letters." "AROUND EVE" is an anagram for his name, "ENDEAVOUR". She reveals her solution and so Lewis at last discovers Morse's first name. In the end, Morse and Adele Cecil arrive at Bath for an overnight stay at the hotel.: Note: This episode features guest actor Roger Allam from Inspector Morse prequel Endeavour as Denis Cornford.
32	4	"The Wench Is Dead"	Robert Knights	Malcolm Bradbury	11 November 1998 12.39m
Morse and Strange attend an exhibit titled "Criminal Oxford". During a lecture by Dr Millicent Van Buren, a visiting professor from Boston University, Morse starts to feel ill and is later found by Strange collapsed on the lavatory floor. While hospitalised, Morse is diagnosed with a bleeding ulcer, which his doctor ascribes to his excessive consumption of alcohol. Morse is concerned that this health scare will lead to his forced early retirement, which Strange recommends. To pass the time in his recovery, he reads Van Buren's book on Victorian investigation techniques, which details the 1859 murder of Joanna Franks, whose body was found floating in the Oxford Canal. Rory Oldfield and Alfred Musson, two boatmen on the fly-boat on which Joanna was travelling, were convicted of the murder and hanged. Another, Walter Towns, received a last-minute commutation to transportation for life. However, Morse comes to believe that the men did not kill Joanna and were victims of a miscarriage of justice. While Lewis is away on an inspector's course, Morse is assisted by Adele Cecil, with whom he is now in a relationship, and Constable Adrian Kershaw, whom Strange has sent on temporary secondment and who shows an aptitude for research and remarkable knowledge about 19th century boatmen. Morse uncovers several inconsistencies in the trial. For instance, Joanna had complained about boatmen being rude and drunk but was soon afterwards seen drinking and laughing with them. The boatman who found the body reported a man walking by on the canal footpath who was not identified at the time. A fourth boatman on the fly-boat, a teenager who was not charged, testified for the prosecution. At that time, prisoners were not able to testify in their own defence. Kershaw visits the criminal archives of the Oxford School of Law for evidence from the trial and copies of the reports of the physician who examined Joanna's body and the mortician who buried her. Consulting Dr Hobson, Morse discovers that the woman's shoes found in the boat were not appropriate for walking outdoors and would not have fit a woman of the height indicated by the length of her dress, which had been altered, or what was reported by the physician. Her drawers, which had been described as torn or ripped, actually had been deliberately cut with a knife. Morse also realises that, while much attention had been paid to the trunk Joanna had left on the boat, there was no mention in the trial record of the contents of her carpetbag. Kershaw, who has a first-class Oxford degree in history, investigates the insurance payment to Joanna's husband Charles Franks and discovers that she had insured herself with an initial payment of £8 but that payment of £300 was made in full to Charles. Morse believes that Joanna and her husband conspired to defraud the insurance company and that she had jumped off the boat while he dumped the body of an unknown woman into the canal. He also realises that the names Donald Favant, later identified as the passerby when the body was found, and Charles Franks, are aliases for Frank Donavan, Joanna's first husband who was a magician and was believed to have died in Ireland, and "Don Favant" is an anagram of F. T. Donavan. Although it is now impossible to exhume the body buried as Joanna, Morse travels to Bertraghboy Bay on the west coast of Ireland, to open the grave of Frank Donavan. When the coffin is opened, there are no human remains. In the end, after a final check-up with the doctor, Morse is finally discharged from outpatient care.: Notes: Colin Dexter, the author of the Inspector Morse novels, wrote this story based on the true crime case surrounding the death of Christina Collins, which occurred in June 1839. This is the only episode not to feature Kevin Whately as DS Robbie Lewis.
33	5	"The Remorseful Day"	Jack Gold	Stephen Churchett	15 November 2000 13.66m
Yvonne Harrison is murdered in her bed and found by her husband, Frank, her body having been tied up in a sexually compromising position. When no progress is made after two months, Morse is taken off the case, and it remains unsolved. A year later, an anonymous letter sent to the police suggests Harry Repp, who is to be released from prison, may be the perpetrator. Morse returns from sick leave, but his failing health has Lewis assuming a more active role. Lewis tries to follow Repp as he heads home from prison on a bus, but he loses him during a bus change and is irritated to discover that Morse had been following him. Morse has a doctor's appointment with Sandra Harrison, who coincidentally is Yvonne's daughter, and she cautions him that his health will not be getting better but may get worse. Lewis meets Debbie Repp to see if her husband has arrived home and finds that Morse had already been to see her, asking whether she had ever posted any letters on Harry's behalf. As he tells Lewis later, Morse believes Harry was afraid and wrote the anonymous letter himself to ensure police surveillance. Paddy Flynn, the cab driver who drove Frank Harrison to his home on the night of the murder, providing him with an alibi, is found dead in a local rubbish dump. Harry Repp is also found dead, in the boot of a stolen car, both men having been stabbed. Flynn and Harry Repp are found to have had unusual amounts of money, leading Lewis to speculate that the two men had been blackmailing whoever killed Yvonne. Then a local handyman and lothario, John Barron – who has been seeing Debbie Repp – is killed in a fall from a ladder. Barron had claimed to have tried to call Yvonne Harrison regarding a building job the night of her murder. Morse and Lewis wonder if Barron had been a third blackmailer and killed the other two so that he could keep the money for himself. Yvonne's son, Simon, is questioned in Barron's death and says he planned to kill him because Barron had killed his mother. Then a teenage boy admits to accidentally causing Barron to fall off the ladder by bumping into it with his bicycle, which aligns with Simon's claims. Dr Hobson finds that the stolen car Repp was found in contains blood from both him and Flynn, along with fingerprints from Barron. Morse, Lewis, the three widows and Frank Harrison all attend Barron's funeral. Debbie Repp tells Morse that, on the night Yvonne was killed, Harry was going to burgle the Harrison home but left when Barron arrived. Barron and Flynn told Harry they both saw who the killer was, so the three joined forces in blackmail. Sandra Harrison tells Morse she has accepted a new position in Canada, which will allow her to get away from her colleague Sir Lionel Phelps, who has been harassing with insinuations that she might share her mother's promiscuous nature. Morse interviews Sir Lionel, who mentions that Frank Harrison had an illegitimate son, the teenage boy who lied to the police in order to get Simon off the hook for killing Barron. Morse calls Lewis and asks him to bring the boy in but then collapses from a heart attack at Exeter College. In the hospital, Morse tells Lewis that Sandra Harrison had killed her mother in a jealous rage over John Barron, beating her with the crutch she was using because of the sprained ankle that was her alibi. After consulting with Strange, who is also there, Lewis heads to the airport to intercept Sandra, who is on her way to Canada. At the same time, police show up to arrest Frank and Simon Harrison. With Strange by his side, Morse asks him to "Thank Lewis for me", and goes into cardiac arrest. Lewis receives a phone call just as he arrives at Heathrow, and Sandra tells him how she killed her mother, how her father made the scene look like there had been a break in, and how both Barron and Flynn demanded money to keep quiet. When she says that Morse will understand what she did, Lewis shouts, "Inspector Morse is dead!". Music from Wagner's Parsifal accompanies the final scene, and in the end after Strange departs, Lewis bids an emotional farewell to Morse at the mortuary and leaves for the final time. The episode ends with a foggy scene around Oxford.

== See also ==
- List of Lewis episodes (2006–2015)
- List of Endeavour episodes (2012–2023)
