= Last Bus to Woodstock =

1975 crime novel by Colin Dexter, first in Inspector Morse series

- Cover of the first edition
- Author: Colin Dexter
- Language: English
- Series: Inspector Morse series, #1
- Genre: Crime
- Publisher: Macmillan
- Publication date: January 1975
- Publication place: United Kingdom
- Media type: Print (Hardcover)
- Pages: 256
- ISBN: 0-333-17929-3
- OCLC: 2983850
- Dewey Decimal: 823/.9/14
- LC Class: PZ4.D5265 Las PR6054.E96
- Followed by: Last Seen Wearing

Last Bus to Woodstock is a crime novel by Colin Dexter, the first of 13 novels in his Inspector Morse series.

== Plot summary ==
Two young women are waiting in Oxford for a bus to the nearby town of Woodstock, and they decide to hitch a lift. Later that night, one of them, Sylvia Kaye, is found murdered and apparently raped in the car park of the Black Prince pub in Woodstock.

Suspicion falls on various characters. The body is reported found by John Sanders, a young man who, it later transpires, is addicted to pornography and sometimes paid Sylvia for sex. He admits to waiting for her on the night of her murder but found her dead. It turns out he interfered with the body but did not murder her.

Inspector Morse discovers the lift was offered in a red car and guesses various bits of information about the owner. His discoveries lead him to calculate the chances of finding a red car in North Oxford which meets all the criteria. There is only one, and it belongs to Bernard Crowther, a don at the university who lives on Southdown Road. Crowther admits that, although married, he is having an affair with another woman. He admits to giving a lift to two women and dropping them in Woodstock while on the way to meet his mistress.

Crowther's wife kills herself, mistakenly thinking that her husband is the murderer; Crowther himself dies shortly afterwards from a heart attack, thinking that she is the killer. In the end, it turns out it was neither of them but rather the other woman at the bus stop, Sue Widdowson, who was Crowther's mistress. Crowther had dropped her off and had sex with Sylvia. Widdowson became insanely jealous, crept up behind Sylvia in the car, and hit her on the back of the head with a tyre lever lying in the car park.

A further complication involves Jennifer Coleby who worked with Sylvia in an insurance office. Jennifer is having an affair with her boss, Palmer, and shares a flat with Sue Widdowson. Crowther types coded messages to Widdowson, who is his girlfriend. He leaves the messages with Coleby at her work, and she delivers them to Widdowson.

== Characters ==
- Inspector Morse
- Sergeant Robert Lewis
- Max
- Sue Widdowson
- Jennifer Coleby
- Bernard Crowther
- Clive Palmer
- Margaret Crowther
- Mrs Jarman
- Peter Newlove
- John Sanders
- Sylvia

== Development history ==
This is the first Inspector Morse novel, and is more carefully plotted than many subsequent books in the series. The reader is not deliberately led astray. Colin Dexter started writing what would become Last Bus to Woodstock on a 1972 family holiday in North Wales. Sitting in the kitchen on a rainy Saturday afternoon he committed to paper a few paragraphs regarding a detective named Morse. Knowing where it would be set, Oxford, and how the story would end, he spent the next 18 months writing the novel.

== Adaptations ==
The novel was adapted for television as part of Inspector Morse and was first aired on 22 March 1988. The character of Sue Widdowson was renamed Mary, and Sylvia's last name was changed to Kane. There were several amendments to the plot in the television adaptation: e.g. the red car was identified through the observations of another woman waiting for the bus and her smart deductions; Crowther did not die of the heart attack, and his wife did not commit suicide; Crowther and Sylvia didn't have sex after he picked her up at the bus stop; the "murder" turned out to be more of an accident—Widdowson confronted Sylvia in the car park, knocked her to the ground, and Crowther unwittingly reversed over her in the car and drove off not knowing; and there was no sexual attack on the corpse by Sanders, only theft. The cast included John Thaw as Morse, Kevin Whately as Sergeant Lewis, Peter Woodthorpe as Max, Ingrid Lacey as Mary Widdowson, Jill Baker as Jennifer Coleby, Anthony Bate as Bernard Crowther, Terrence Hardiman as Clive Palmer, Shirley Dixon as Margaret Crowther, Fabia Drake as Mrs Jarman, Paul Geoffrey as Peter Newlove, Ian Sears as John Sanders, Holly Aird as Angie Hartman, Shirley Stelfox as Mrs Kane and Jenny Jay as Sylvia Kane.

The book was first dramatised as a radio play by the BBC on Radio 4 in 1975. The announcer reading the end credits attributes the authorship of the original book to Colin Dempster.

In 1984, a BBC Radio 4 adaptation was released that was dramatised by Melville Jones and directed by Brian Miller. The radio play featured Andrew Burt as Inspector Morse and Christopher Douglas as Sergeant Lewis.
