= The Silent World of Nicholas Quinn =

Book by Colin Dexter

- Cover of the first edition
- Author: Colin Dexter
- Language: English
- Series: Inspector Morse series, #3
- Genre: crime novel
- Publisher: Macmillan
- Publication date: 5 May 1977
- Publication place: United Kingdom
- Media type: Print (Hardcover)
- Pages: 254
- ISBN: 0-333-21626-1
- OCLC: 6080737
- Preceded by: Last Seen Wearing
- Followed by: Service of All the Dead

The Silent World of Nicholas Quinn is a crime novel by Colin Dexter, the third novel in the Inspector Morse series.

== Synopsis ==
The plot revolves around the work and staff of the Oxford Foreign Examinations Syndicate, an Oxford-based body that sets and administers school exams in overseas countries with British connections. The Syndicate has five graduate staff, headed by the permanent Secretary, Dr Thomas Bartlett, and including Philip Ogleby (deputy secretary), Monica Height, and Donald Martin, as well as several more junior clerical and other staff. Its work is overseen by a board of twelve "syndics", all fellows of Oxford colleges.

The novel opens with a meeting of the Syndicate's appointments committee, called to fill a graduate vacancy that has arisen from the departure of George Bland to take up a post in the education department of the Sheikdom of Al-jamara, an oil state in the Persian Gulf. Bartlett favours the appointment of a candidate named Fielding; but Christopher Roope, a chemistry don and one of the syndics, argues for Nicholas Quinn. Quinn is well qualified for the post but is severely deaf. He is an adept lipreader so his deafness would not be a serious liability in many of his duties, but he would have considerable difficulty in using the phone. Roope bases his arguments on principles of positive discrimination: the committee is persuaded and Quinn is duly appointed.

A few months later, after Quinn has settled into his new position, he fails to appear at the office one Monday morning and is subsequently found dead in his maisonette, having been poisoned with cyanide.

Inspector Morse, assisted by Sergeant Lewis, investigates the case. Quinn had last been seen alive in the office on the previous Friday morning, but there is considerable confusion about what happened after that, as all the graduate staff appear to have been out of the office in the afternoon. Morse and Lewis conduct interviews and pursue other leads but get little further forward. There are numerous contradictions in the statements given by the different staff members – accounted for in part by the fact that Monica Height had been involved in sexual affairs with both Donald Martin and Philip Ogleby. Curiously, it seems that nearly all the staff, including Quinn, had tickets for a showing of a film titled The Nymphomaniac at the Studio 2 cinema in Walton Street on the Friday afternoon. At a later stage in the investigation, Ogleby is found murdered at his home, and a drawing of Quinn's cinema ticket is found in his diary.

It transpires that behind these events had been a corrupt scheme to leak advance details of exam papers to candidates in Al-jamara, in exchange for payment. Morse concludes that Roope, Bland and Bartlett had all been involved in this conspiracy: the apparent animosity between Bartlett and Roope had been staged, designed to give the false impression that the two were at loggerheads. Quinn had learned about the scheme by lipreading some indiscreet remarks made at a reception hosted by a visiting delegation of Al-jamara education officials. Realising that Quinn had to be silenced, Bartlett had poisoned him in his office, before driving the body back to Quinn's home. Having deduced something of this, Ogleby had begun to pursue his own investigation, and so had also been killed.

However, in the final pages of the book Morse comes to the realisation that he, and Quinn before him, had been mistaken. Quinn's lipreading had been good but not flawless, and he had read the name "Doctor Bartlett" when what was actually said was "Donald Martin". It was in fact Martin who had been implicated in the exam fraud, and who had then killed both Quinn and Ogleby.

== Characters ==
- Inspector Morse
- Sergeant Robert Lewis
- Dr Thomas Bartlett
- Philip Ogleby
- Monica Height
- Donald Martin
- Nicholas Quinn
- Dr Christopher Roope
- Chief Superintendent Strange
- Constable Dixon

== Inspiration ==
The novel's premise and setting include autobiographical elements from Colin Dexter's own life. He experienced profound deafness, which forced him in 1966 (at the age of 36) to give up his career as a teacher, and to become senior assistant secretary at the University of Oxford Delegacy of Local Examinations, a post he held until his retirement in 1988.

== Publication history ==
- 1977, London: Macmillan ISBN 0-333-21626-1, Pub date 5 May 1977, Hardback

== Adaptations ==
Television

The novel was adapted as the second episode of the Inspector Morse TV series in 1987. The adaptation remained faithful to the source material, the only noticeable changes being the omission of much of the material prior to Quinn's murder. The television version begins with him already employed by the syndicate. The film watched by the characters was changed to Last Tango in Paris.

The cast included John Thaw as Inspector Endeavour Morse, Kevin Whately as Sergeant Robert Lewis, Barbara Flynn as Monica Height, Michael Gough as Philip Ogleby, Clive Swift as Dr Bartlett, Anthony Smee as Dr Roope, Roger Lloyd-Pack as Donald Martin, Lyndam Gregory as Sergeant Dixon, Phil Nice as Nicholas Quinn.

Radio play

In 1996, a BBC Radio 4 adaptation was released that was dramatised by Guy Meredith and directed by Ned Chaillet. The cast included John Shrapnel as Inspector Morse, Robert Glenister as Sergeant Robert Lewis, Meg Davies as Monica Height, David Timson as Philip Ogleby, Richard Pasco as Dr Bartlett, John Hartley as Dr Roope, Stephen Critchlow as Donald Martin, Lyndam Gregory as Sergeant Dixon and Roger May as Nicholas Quinn.
