= Last Seen Wearing (Dexter novel) =

1976 novel by Colin Dexter

- Cover of the first edition
- Author: Colin Dexter
- Cover artist: John Ireland
- Language: English
- Series: Inspector Morse series, #2
- Genre: crime novel
- Publisher: Macmillan
- Publication date: April 1976
- Publication place: United Kingdom
- Media type: Print (Hardcover)
- Pages: 288
- ISBN: 0-333-19245-1
- Preceded by: Last Bus to Woodstock
- Followed by: The Silent World of Nicholas Quinn

Last Seen Wearing is a 1976 crime novel by Colin Dexter, the second novel in the Inspector Morse series.

The novel was adapted by Thomas Ellice for the television series, first transmitted in 1988. In 1994, it was adapted by Guy Meredith for BBC Radio 4.

== Synopsis ==
Valerie Taylor, a teenage pupil at the Roger Bacon Comprehensive School in Kidlington, north of Oxford, goes missing. Two years later, and shortly after the story has been revived in a Sunday Times feature about missing girls, the investigating officer, Inspector Ainley, is killed in a road accident. Shortly after that, Valerie's parents receive a letter with a London postmark, apparently written by Valerie and saying she is "alright".

Inspector Morse, assisted by Sergeant Lewis, is assigned the case. Morse remains convinced that Valerie is dead, and tries to find out what happened on the day she disappeared. She had gone home for lunch, and was apparently last seen by a lollipop man, wearing her distinctive uniform and carrying a bag, on her return journey to school.

Morse and Lewis speak to a number of individuals linked to the case. These include Valerie's mother, Grace Taylor, who bears a close resemblance to her daughter, and stepfather, George Taylor, a worker at the city rubbish tip; the school headmaster, Donald Phillipson, and his wife Sheila, between whom there is an element of mistrust; Reginald Baines, second master and previously an unsuccessful candidate for the headmastership; David Acum, a French teacher who had taught Valerie's last lesson, but who left Oxford not long afterwards to teach in Caernarfon, North Wales; and Johnny Maguire, a former schoolmate of Valerie, now working at a strip club in London. Morse develops a succession of theories and assumptions about the case, many of which turn out to be flawed.

The plot thickens when Baines is stabbed to death at his house near Oxford station. Morse discovers that he had been practising imitating Valerie's handwriting, and so might have forged the letter in her name. The Taylors and the Phillipsons all fall under a degree of suspicion for Baines' murder, as does Acum, who was attending a conference in Oxford at the time. Sheila Phillipson and David Acum both eventually admit that they independently called at Baines' house that evening; but both say that, although the front door was unlocked, they saw no sign of Baines.

Just as Morse is becoming more certain than ever that Valerie is dead, it emerges that, shortly after her disappearance, she had checked in to an abortion clinic in London. The clinic refuses to divulge further information, but Morse interviews Yvonne Baker, a girl who had shared a room with her there, and who vaguely remembers Valerie saying that the father of her child was a French teacher. Morse and Lewis drive to Caernarfon to interview Acum again, and Morse meets, for a second time, Acum's wife. He has theorised that the woman posing as Mrs Acum may in fact be Valerie Taylor; but her fluency in French and other clues now persuade him that he is mistaken. Acum admits that he had had a sexual fling with Valerie, was probably responsible for her pregnancy, and helped pay for the abortion, but says that he knows nothing about what happened to her subsequently.

It becomes clear that Baines had been blackmailing Phillipson over a brief sexual encounter he had had with Valerie when Phillipson had visited Oxford three years earlier to be interviewed for the headmastership. Sheila Phillipson gained some knowledge of this, and, for the sake of her marriage, had gone to confront Baines: she now signs a confession admitting killing him – but Morse is convinced that she is lying, and perhaps covering up for her husband. It eventually transpires that "Mrs Acum" is indeed Valerie Taylor, and that she had driven from Caernarfon to Oxford to kill Baines. By the time Morse realises this, it is too late, and she has disappeared again.

== Characters ==
- Inspector Morse
- Sergeant Robert Lewis
- Donald Phillipson
- Sheila Phillipson
- George Taylor
- Grace Taylor
- Reginald Baines
- David Acum
- Valerie Taylor
- Chief Superintendent Strange

== Publication history ==
- 1976, London: Macmillan ISBN 0-333-19245-1, Pub date April 1976, Hardback

== Adaptations ==
The 1988 television adaptation for the Inspector Morse television series had several differences from the novel. Valerie's last name was Craven, her father was a prominent builder, and she had only been missing for a few months. The school deputy head Baines was a woman. David Acum lived in Reading rather than Caernarfon. Headmaster Phillipson was the lover of Valerie's mother, not Valerie, and he was the murderer of Baines. Valerie returned to her parents' home at the end of the episode. The cast included John Thaw as Chief Inspector Morse, Kevin Whately as Sergeant Lewis, Peter McEnery as Donald Phillipson, Suzanne Bertish as Cheryl Baines, Glyn Houston as George Craven, Frances Tomelty as Gwen Craven, Fiona Mollison as Shelia Phillipson, Melissa Simmonds as Valerie Craven, James Grout as Chief Superintendent Strange, Elizabeth Hurley as Julia, and Julia Sawalha as Rachel.

The character of Donald Phillipson also appears in the novel Service of All the Dead, although the books were adapted in reverse order for television and Phillipson's fate is very different.

In 1994 the BBC Radio 4 play Last Seen Wearing was adapted from the novel by Guy Meredith and directed by Ned Chaillet. It starred John Shrapnel as Morse and Robert Glenister as Lewis. It also featured Miles Anderson, Donald Sumpter, Terence Edmond, Tamsin Greig and Emily Woof.
