= The Jewel That Was Ours =

Book by Colin Dexter

- Cover of the first edition
- Author: Colin Dexter
- Language: English
- Series: Inspector Morse series, #9
- Genre: crime novel
- Publisher: Macmillan
- Publication date: 11 July 1991
- Publication place: United Kingdom
- Media type: Print (Hardcover)
- Pages: 224
- ISBN: 0-333-55911-8
- OCLC: 59891508
- Preceded by: The Wench Is Dead
- Followed by: The Way Through the Woods

The Jewel That Was Ours is a crime novel by Colin Dexter, the ninth novel in the Inspector Morse series. This novel was written by Dexter after he wrote a screenplay for an episode titled The Wolvercote Tongue in series 2 of the television programme Inspector Morse.

Reviews in 1992 were mixed. One compared this with the prior novel, finding it a step down, though still a strong story. The other compared it with the plot in the television episode aired in 1987, and found the novel far better as to plot twists.

== Plot summary ==
The Historical Cities of England tour group is arriving in Oxford, staying in the best hotel in town. Retired Americans travel together, listening to talks by experts. The highlight in Oxford will be provided by tour member Laura Stratton, who is donating the Wolvercote Tongue to the Ashmolean Museum, pursuant to her first husband's will. Dr Theodore Kemp has written a book about this piece from the time of King Alfred the Great, gold set with rubies, and the tongue fits exactly with a buckle also found in England. Just 45 minutes after arrival in the hotel, Mrs Stratton is found in their hotel room, dead on the floor, by her husband who had taken a short walk with Shirley Brown. A bit later, Eddie Stratton notices that her handbag is gone, and the Wolvercote tongue was kept in it. The hotel doctor determines she died of natural causes, and the police are called in to deal with the theft.

Sergeant Lewis and Chief Inspector Morse arrive. Morse calls in the police pathologist, Max, for a cause of death he will trust. Max says it is a coronary, a heart attack, nothing suspicious. Lewis and Morse talk to the tour leaders and then the tourists. It is clear that many of them are not telling the truth about what they did in those 45 minutes, or not saying much at all. Sheila Williams bursts into tears, saying only, ask Dr Kemp, and Dr Kemp says he does not keep track of his time like that. Cedric Downes was with students. When John Ashenden, leader of the tour, returns from his walk about Oxford, he says he went to Magdalen College to take a look at it. Morse later learns that college was closed to visitors as there is renovation work underway in the buildings. Morse thinks this theft was done by one of the tourists. The tourists include a few married couples, the rest on their own. The couples are Howard and Shirley Brown, the Strattons, and Sam and Vera Kronquist. Much noted is outspoken Mrs Janet Roscoe, and the quiet Phil Aldrich, who does not hear very well.

Kemp gives a talk that evening along with Cedric Downes and Mrs Williams. Kemp is quite disappointed, as the launch of his book will not begin with the two pieces, the buckle and the tongue, together in one piece, at the museum. The next morning he goes into London to meet with his publisher and discuss other plans. He is not available for the late morning question and answer session, which his wife let the other presenters know. He calls Ashenden later to say he will be back in time for the 3 pm event. Ashenden sends a taxi to meet Kemp at the train station. The taxi driver does not bring Kemp back. The tour moves on, to Stratford-upon-Avon. No one sees Kemp until his naked body is found in the River Cherwell. Max says Kemp was hit in the head, and bled much before the river washed his blood away. All in the tour write out where they were from the time when Kemp was supposed to appear in Oxford. Aldrich and Brown had been in Oxford for World War II; each wrote that they sought out someone from that time. Aldrich wrote of a daughter he never saw, born to an Englishwoman, while Brown met the woman, now a grandmother, who had been his love then. Morse is convinced that Downes is the killer, jealous that Kemp was sleeping with his wife. After he has arrested Downes, London police alert them that his wife has been hit by a car there and is in the hospital with broken bones. Lewis goes to London to check on her. Downes reveals that the key found by the police is to his locker at his golf club. Marion Kemp, wife of Theodore, commits suicide in their flat, leaving a note. At a dead end, Morse begins again.

The tour moves on to Bath. Ashenden writes to Morse with the real truth of what he did in the 45 minutes when Mrs Stratton died, and when Kemp was killed, private to him and traceable. Reading of a road accident starts Morse on another theory. Lewis learns that Eddie Stratton has left England already, with his wife's remains. Morse realises that Kemp had called Ashenden from his publisher's office, Babbington, which sounded like Paddington, the railway station, over the poor connection, a misdirection for Morse. Morse asks Dixon to trace the rental car company, for the car used to pick up Kemp. The manager recalls that the client gave him a direct number to the assistant manager at the hotel. Eddie Stratton is arrested as he steps off the plane in New York City, and tells Morse by phone about his financial situation. Morse and Lewis head to Bath.

Morse unravels the motives and the actors in the murder and the theft at Bath, with the tourists as his audience. Two couples from the tour had motives that paired well. The Strattons had little cash left from Laura's first husband, and wanted the insurance value of the Wolvercote tongue. Janet Roscoe and Phil Aldrich, married over 40 years, wanted to ruin Kemp's life. Two years earlier, Kemp caused a serious car accident, which resulted for him in no driving for three years. In that collision, he was driving with his pregnant wife as passenger. The driver of the other car, a 29 year old married woman, was killed and his wife lost the pregnancy and her mobility, as she is paralyzed. She is reliant on a wheelchair and confined to their flat. She is angry at her husband. The married woman, Phillipa Janet Mayo was the only child of Janet and Phil. They were aggrieved at the light sentence he got, while their daughter, their jewel, died. Janet has terminal cancer, so when they saw the tour advertised, they signed up. On the tour bus, they overheard the Strattons talking and entered into an agreement with them. They would make the Wolvercote Tongue disappear while Eddie was out of the hotel, in return for his help in killing Kemp. That made him an accessory. Phil picked Kemp up from the rail station and drove to the Kemp home – not at all what he wrote in his false story. Marion's cane was used to strike Kemp; neither Eddie nor Phil nor Janet will say which person hit him with that cane. Kemp fell, hit his head on the fireplace, a second injury to his fragile skull, and bled to death. Before his marriage, Eddie had a funeral home and was accustomed to preparing a body for burial. It was simple for him to remove the clothing and cart the body to slide it into the river. He said he tossed the tongue into the river. Janet made the handbag and the cane disappear by putting them with other handbags and other canes.

The three are arrested and the case is over as far as Morse is concerned, once he made a brief report to Chief Superintendent Strange. Eddie thinks about the casket with his wife's body in it, and the ruby from the Wolvercote tongue hidden in the side. Maybe someday he will recover it.

== Characters ==
- Chief Inspector Morse: He is the lead police detective for the events among the tour.
- Sergeant Lewis: He is the partner of Morse, skilled at organization.
- Max: Police pathologist who has been with Oxford police as long as Morse.
- Chief Superintendent Strange: Morse reports to him.
- Sergeant Dixon: He is on the staff who assist Morse.

Tour organizers and presenters

- John Ashenden: Leader of the tour. He is person with a side interest he will not discuss openly, confessing it only in a letter to Morse at the end.
- Sheila Williams: She is a liaison and event organiser for the university. She has been having an affair with Kemp.
- Dr Theodore Kemp: Curator at the Ashmolean Museum. He is about to publish a book on the Wolvercote tongue and buckle. He is known as a philanderer at Oxford.
- Marion Kemp: She is Kemp's wife. She lost her pregnancy and is reliant on a wheelchair and housebound since an auto accident caused by her husband two years earlier.
- Cedric Downes: He is an expert on English architecture of past centuries. He uses a hearing aid in his right ear.
- Lucy Downes: She is married to Cedric. She is 11 years younger than her husband, and rumoured as the last lover of Kemp.

Retired Americans on tour of historic cities of England

- Eddie Stratton: Married to Laura for about two years.
- Laura Stratton: Married to Eddie, her second husband. She is on the tour to give the Wolvercote tongue to the museum, as directed in the will of her first husband.
- Phil Aldrich: He is a quiet man.
- Janet Roscoe: She is petite, and vociferous, speaking up with her knowledge of England and its history.
- Howard and Shirley Brown: They become friends with the Strattons on the tour.
- Sam and Vera Kronquist: One of the few married couples on this tour.
- Nancy Wiseman: She occasionally sits next to Phil, and writes home to her daughter as the tour proceeds.

== Reviews ==
Kirkus Reviews felt that "this effort succeeds best in the small details—e.g., the use of a hearing aid as a clue—while being somewhat slapdash and sketchy in its character analysis and dialogue. Less impressive than the eight previous Morse stories, and far less adroit than Dexter's handling of The Wench is Dead."

Entertainment Weekly found this novel to be better than televised version, with more twists to the plot and the American characters less "irritating caricatures" than in the television programme, and he remarks on the "tart narration" by Dexter. In contrast to the televised story, the novel The Jewel That Was Ours, "Morse makes these same deductions only to find himself utterly, shamefully wrong — a delicious moment — before groping his way to the new, improved solution: an emotion-loaded switcheroo worthy of Agatha Christie."

== Setting ==
Most of the story is set in Oxford, much at the Randolph Hotel, which is across the street from the Ashmolean Museum. The city of Bath is another setting for this novel. It is November 1990. Morse is 55 years old, the tourists from America are 65 to 75 years old, and the staff for the tour, including the Oxford dons are mid 30s to mid 40s in age. The narrative includes much description of Oxford and its highlights.

The Wolvercote Tongue is based on the Alfred Jewel, which is held at the Ashmolean Museum in Oxford. Wolvercote is a village that is very close to Oxford.

== Development ==
The episode of the Inspector Morse TV series which corresponds to the novel is entitled The Wolvercote Tongue (screened season 2, 1987). Unique among the series, the book was written four years after the corresponding TV episode, for which Dexter had created the story. Colin Dexter offers different solutions to the same murder, in this novel compared to the earlier television episode.

== Publication history ==
- 1991, London: Macmillan ISBN 0-333-43139-1, Pub date 11 July 1991, Hardback
- 1992, New York: Crown Publishers ISBN 0-517-58847-1, Pub date 24 March 1992, Hardback
