= The Dead of Jericho =

English novel

- Cover of the first edition
- Author: Colin Dexter
- Language: English
- Series: Inspector Morse series, #5
- Genre: crime novel
- Publisher: Macmillan
- Publication date: 4 June 1981
- Publication place: United Kingdom
- Media type: Print (Hardcover)
- Pages: 224
- ISBN: 0333317289
- OCLC: 8900702
- Preceded by: Service of All the Dead
- Followed by: The Riddle of the Third Mile

The Dead of Jericho, published in 1981, is a work of English detective fiction by Colin Dexter. It is the fifth novel in the Inspector Morse series. In 1987 it was adapted as the first episode of the highly successful television series inspired by the novels, also called Inspector Morse.

== Plot summary ==
Detective Chief Inspector E. Morse of the Thames Valley Police meets Anne Scott at a party hosted by Mrs Murdoch in North Oxford. Six months later Anne Scott is found hanging in her kitchen at 9 Canal Reach, Jericho, Oxford. The police launch a suicide inquiry. Initially Chief Inspector Bell, from the closer Oxford Central station on St. Aldate's Street, is assigned to the case; but a fortnight later Morse takes over the investigation and questions the assumption of suicide. Subsequently both of Mrs Murdoch's sons, Edward "Ted" Murdoch and Michael Murdoch, as well as Anne Scott's former employers, brothers Charles Richards and Conrad Richards, and Charles's wife, Celia, come to the attention of Morse, as do Ms Scott's neighbours, including the nosy handyman George Jackson. Dexter gives a big clue to what might have been going on in Anne Scott's mind with one chapter headed with this epigram from Sophocles's Oedipus Rex: "We saw a knotted pendulum, a noose: and a strangled woman swinging there".

== Television adaptation ==
"The Dead of Jericho" is the first instalment of the Inspector Morse TV series starring John Thaw and Kevin Whately (as Detective Sergeant Lewis). Colin Dexter also appears briefly in a non-speaking, unnamed role as a man walking along a cloister in the opposite direction to Morse (as they pass Morse gives Dexter a suspicious backwards glance). Filmed in the summer of 1986, it aired 6 January 1987. Anthony Minghella wrote the adaptation and the episode was directed by Alastair Reid.

Several changes were made from the book. Anne's last name of Scott was changed to Staveley (the part was played by Gemma Jones). The first names of the three Richards were changed to Anthony "Tony" (James Laurenson), Alan (Richard Durden), and Adele (Annie Lambert), making the Cs into As. Edward "Ted" Murdoch was changed to Ned Murdoch (Spencer Leigh). Former Doctor Who star Patrick Troughton, in one of his final roles, played George Jackson.

Sophocles's Oedipus Rex also figures in episode 3.1 of the spin-off TV series Lewis.
