= The Way Through the Woods =

1992 novel by Colin Dexter

- Cover of the first edition
- Author: Colin Dexter
- Language: English
- Series: Inspector Morse series, #10
- Genre: crime novel
- Publisher: Macmillan
- Publication date: 9 October 1992
- Publication place: United Kingdom
- Media type: Print (Hardcover)
- Pages: 288
- ISBN: 0-333-58373-6
- OCLC: 29430663
- Dewey Decimal: 823/.914 20
- LC Class: PR6054.E96 W3 1992
- Preceded by: The Jewel That Was Ours
- Followed by: The Daughters of Cain

The Way Through the Woods is a crime novel by Colin Dexter, the tenth novel in the Inspector Morse series. It received the Gold Dagger Award in 1992.

The novel was adapted for television in 1995, as an episode of the Inspector Morse series.

== Plot summary ==
A beautiful young Swedish woman, Karin Eriksson, goes missing. A year later, an anonymous riddle, in the form of a five-stanza poem, is sent to the police and the case is reopened. The police ask The Times for help with the poem. Morse and Sergeant Lewis are put in charge of the new investigation.

Morse is intrigued by a cryptic clue, which is taken to mean Karin has been murdered. He is given the case and notes that the clue seems to include a reference to Wytham Woods, north-west of Oxford, where he believed the police should have searched in the first place. The police search the area with help from head forester David Michaels and a body is found, but it is that of a man.

Morse and Lewis talk to George Daley, who found Karin's bag. His wife Margaret gives them some photos developed from Karin's camera, showing a young man and a house, but tears up some more showing Karin naked. Morse identifies the house in the photo but the tenant, McBryde, disappears before he can be questioned. Morse and Lewis find the house was being used to make pornographic films and the client list includes Daley and a local lecturer, Alan Hardinge. Daley is found dead in Blenheim Park. Michaels is suspected but was showing some RSPB representatives around at the time, since the gatewarden recalls when Daley entered the park.

The first body turns out to be Myton, the man in the photographs. Hardinge admits that Myton was taking photographs of Karin in private at the house but when the others in the house checked on them they were both dead. He, McBryde, Daley and Michaels conspired to hide the bodies. Morse, however, realises this is a lie and Karin is still alive.

Daley's son Phillip has an alibi for his father's murder, and nonetheless commits suicide. Morse and Lewis speak to Michaels' wife Cathy and realise she is Karin. She killed Myton when he tried to rape her and was sheltered by Michaels, who persuaded the others to cover the matter up. Morse realises that Michaels killed Daley and then had Cathy dress up as him and drive to the woods to hide the body, in order to give himself an alibi. Lewis learns Morse sent the cryptic clue in the first place.

== Continuity ==
This book marks the death from natural causes of Morse's pathologist friend Max, whose full name is revealed as Maximillian de Bryn.

== Publication history ==
- 1992, London: Macmillan ISBN 0-333-58373-6, pub. date 9 October 1992, hardback

== Adaptation ==
The television adaptation guest-starred Nicholas Le Prevost as Hardinge, Neil Dudgeon as Michaels, Michelle Fairley as Cathy and Christopher Fairbank as Daley. Karin Eriksson became English girl Karen Anderson, a more unstable character who had been sexually abused by her father and served time in jail for murdering him. A subplot was added dealing with conflict between Morse and the original investigating officer, DCI Johnson (played by Malcolm Storry), who pinned Karen's murder on Steven Parnell, a serial killer responsible for four other deaths, and tried to beat a confession out of Phillip for his father's murder. Phillip's suicide was omitted but a more violent and dramatic ending added where Cathy kills both Daley and Michaels to protect her secret, finally perishing from a shot from her own gun when Morse knocks it out of her hands as she threatens him and Lewis.
