= The Remorseful Day =

1999 crime novel by Colin Dexter, last in Inspector Morse series

- Cover of the first edition
- Author: Colin Dexter
- Language: English
- Series: Inspector Morse series, #13
- Genre: crime novel
- Publisher: Macmillan
- Publication date: 15 September 1999
- Publication place: United Kingdom
- Media type: Print (Hardcover)
- Pages: 384
- ISBN: 0-333-76157-X
- OCLC: 319809285
- Preceded by: Death Is Now My Neighbour

The Remorseful Day is a crime novel by Colin Dexter, the last novel in the Inspector Morse series. The novel was adapted as the final episode in the Inspector Morse television series.

== Title ==
The title derives from a line in the poem "XVI – (How clear, how lovely bright)", from More Poems, by A. E. Housman, a favourite poet of Dexter and Morse:

Ensanguining the skies
How heavily it dies
Into the west away;
Past touch and sight and sound
Not further to be found,
How hopeless under ground
Falls the remorseful day.

== Plot ==
Morse tries to solve the unsolved murder of Yvonne Harrison, as his health deteriorates.

Harrison, a nurse, has inspired romantic attachment in Morse during an earlier (and separate) illness, and he has written to her about it. She is a sharer of her favours; recipients, including her daughter's lover, are serially suspect.

His superintendent has found Morse's letter among crime-scene evidence but has sequestered it.

Morse dies of acute myocardial infarction; his last words are "Thank Lewis for me."

== Publication history ==
- 1999: London: Macmillan ISBN 0-333-76157-X, Pub date 15 September 1999, Hardback

== Adaptations ==
This novel was adapted for the television series Inspector Morse as an episode of the same title "The Remorseful Day", the final episode of the series (fifth in Series 8) as well as of the novels. It guest starred Paul Freeman as Frank Harrison, Anna Wilson-Jones as the Harrisons' daughter (renamed Sandra rather than Sarah) and Jesse Birdsall as John Barron. The adaptation was largely faithful but removed the detail of Morse trying to hide the fact Yvonne had had an affair with Strange and a subplot involving the suicide of a teacher having an affair with teenager Roy Holmes, and added the character of Sir Lionel Phelps (played by T P McKenna), Sandra's superior and a former lover of Yvonne's, as a suspect.
