= The Daughters of Cain =

Book by Colin Dexter

- Cover of the first edition
- Author: Colin Dexter
- Language: English
- Series: Inspector Morse series, #11
- Genre: Crime novel
- Publisher: Macmillan
- Publication date: 11 November 1994
- Publication place: United Kingdom
- Media type: Print (Hardcover)
- Pages: 320
- ISBN: 0-333-63004-1
- OCLC: 31763316
- Dewey Decimal: 823/.914 20
- LC Class: PR6054.E96 D38 1994
- Preceded by: The Way Through the Woods
- Followed by: Death Is Now My Neighbour

The Daughters of Cain is a crime novel by Colin Dexter. It is the eleventh novel in the Inspector Morse series.

== Synopsis ==
The body of Dr Felix McClure, Ancient History don of Wolsey College, Oxford, is found in his flat. A brutal murder – a single stab to the stomach with a broad knife. The police have no weapon, no suspect and no motive. The case leads Morse into the path of Edward Brooks, who himself disappears following a museum theft. Then the weapon is found and there are suddenly too many suspects.

The knife used to kill McClure was stolen from the museum by Brooks. He was able to steal it without it being noticed because he worked there and had a key. Brooks used to work at the college and killed McClure because he found out he was dealing drugs. He was also violent towards his wife Brenda and sexually abused his stepdaughter Ellie. Brenda told her friend Julia Stevens that Brooks was the killer. Julia seduced a student, Kevin Costyn, into breaking into the museum case so the theft would be discovered.

Brooks is found dead, stabbed with the same knife he used to kill McClure. Julia, who has a terminal brain tumour, intends to confess to Morse but dies before she can do so. Ellie flees Oxford, leaving behind a note saying she killed Brooks. Morse however concludes that Brenda was the real killer and arrests her.

== Adaptations ==
This novel was adapted for television in the Inspector Morse series, airing as The Daughters of Cain, the second episode in series 8 in 1996. The main roles of the detectives were the same actors as throughout the series, John Thaw as Detective Chief Inspector Morse and Kevin Whately as Detective Sergeant Lewis. It guest stars Phyllis Logan as Julia Stevens, Gabrielle Lloyd as Brenda Brooks, Anthony Haygarth as Ted Brooks and Amanda Ryan as Kay Brooks. The adaptation is largely faithful but the character of Ellie, renamed Kay in the adaptation which is her working name in the novel, is considerably sanitised, with her status as a prostitute turned to a high-class escort and her flirting with Morse, history of abuse and miscarriage omitted. A subplot about the detective working the case's wife falling ill is also removed. The ending is changed, with Julia leaving behind a note taking full responsibility for Brooks' murder and Morse and Lewis unable to prove Brenda and Kay were involved.

== Publication history ==
- 1994, London: Macmillan ISBN 0-333-63004-1, Pub date 11 November 1994, Hardback
