= Colin Dexter =

English writer (1930–2017)

Colin Dexter OBE
- Born: Norman Colin Dexter; 29 September 1930; Stamford, Lincolnshire, England
- Died: 21 March 2017 (aged 86); Oxford, England
- Education: Christ's College, Cambridge (MA)
- Occupation: Novelist
- Spouse: Dorothy Cooper (m. 1956)
- Children: 2
- Writing career
- Genre: Crime fiction
- Notable work: Inspector Morse series (1975–1999)
- Colin Dexter's voice Recorded August 2007 from the BBC Radio 4 programme Bookclub

Norman Colin Dexter (29 September 1930 – 21 March 2017) was an English crime writer known for his Inspector Morse series of novels, which were written between 1975 and 1999 and adapted as an ITV television series, Inspector Morse, from 1987 to 2000. His characters spawned a sequel series, Lewis, from 2006 to 2015, and a prequel series, Endeavour, from 2012 to 2023. Dexter also set crosswords for The Oxford Times.

== Early life and career ==
Dexter was born in Stamford, Lincolnshire, to Alfred and Dorothy Dexter. He had an elder brother, John, a fellow classicist, who taught Classics at The King's School, Peterborough, and a sister, Avril. Alfred ran a small garage and taxi company from premises in Scotgate, Stamford. Dexter was educated at St John's Infants School and Bluecoat Junior School, from which he gained a scholarship to Stamford School, a boys' grammar school, where a younger contemporary was England cricket captain and England rugby player, M. J. K. Smith.

After leaving school Dexter did his national service with the Royal Corps of Signals and then read Classics at Christ's College, Cambridge, graduating in 1953 and receiving a master's degree in 1958.

In 1954, Dexter began his teaching career as assistant Classics master at Wyggeston Grammar School for Boys in Leicester. There he helped the school's Christian Union. However in 2000 he stated that he shared the same views on politics and religion as Inspector Morse, who was portrayed as an atheist already in the first Morse novel, Last Bus to Woodstock. A post at Loughborough Grammar School followed in 1957, then he took up the position of senior Classics teacher at Corby Grammar School, Northamptonshire, in 1959.

In 1966, he was forced by the onset of deafness to retire from teaching and took up the post of senior assistant secretary at the University of Oxford Delegacy of Local Examinations (UODLE) in Oxford, a job he held until his retirement in 1988.

In November 2008, Dexter featured prominently in the BBC Four programme How to Solve a Cryptic Crossword, as part of the Timeshift series, in which he recounted some of the crossword clues solved by Morse.

== Writing career ==
The first books Dexter wrote were general studies textbooks. He began writing mysteries in 1972 during a family holiday. Last Bus to Woodstock was published in 1975 and introduced the character of Inspector Morse, the irascible detective whose penchants for cryptic crosswords, English literature, real ale, and Wagner operas reflected Dexter's own enthusiasms. Dexter's plots used red herrings, "presenting Morse, and his readers, with fiendishly difficult puzzles to solve".

The success of the 33 two-hour episodes of the ITV television series Inspector Morse, produced between 1987 and 2000, brought further attention to Dexter's writings. The show featured Morse, played by John Thaw, and his assistant Robert Lewis, a sergeant played by Kevin Whately. In the manner of Alfred Hitchcock, Dexter made a cameo appearance in almost all episodes.

From 2006 to 2015, Lewis was featured in a 33-episode ITV series titled Lewis (Inspector Lewis in the United States). He is assisted by James Hathaway, a detective sergeant played by Laurence Fox. A prequel series, Endeavour, features a young Morse and stars Shaun Evans and Roger Allam. Endeavour was first broadcast on the ITV network in 2012, ending with the ninth series in 2023, taking young Morse's career into 1972. Dexter was a consultant for Lewis and the first few years of Endeavour. As with Morse, Dexter occasionally made appearances in both series.

Dexter set crosswords for The Oxford Times as "Codex" (COlin DEXter). Some of these were published in 2006 as Morse Crosswords (Chambers). He took the names for some of his characters, including Morse and Lewis, from other cruciverbalists. All the characters in Last Bus to Woodstock, the first Morse novel, were named after crossword compilers or entrants in The Observer's puzzles, "except the murderer". For example, although Dexter's military service was as a Morse code operator, the character was named after his friend Sir Jeremy Morse, a crossword devotee like Dexter. Alec Robins – "Zander" in the BBC magazine The Listener and "Custos" in The Guardian – introduced Dexter to Jeremy Morse (who later became chairman of Lloyds Bank) at a crossword dinner. At the same dinner was Robins' Everyman crossword colleague on The Observer, Dorothy Taylor. She had used the alias Mrs B Lewis so she could carry on entering Observer prize crossword competitions after she became a compiler there. Dexter took inspiration from the two names.

The music for the television series, written by Barrington Pheloung, used a motif based on the Morse code for Morse's name.

== Awards and honours ==
Dexter received several Crime Writers' Association awards: two Silver Daggers for Service of All the Dead in 1979 and The Dead of Jericho in 1981; two Gold Daggers for The Wench is Dead in 1989 and The Way Through the Woods in 1992; and a Cartier Diamond Dagger for lifetime achievement in 1997. In 1996, Dexter received a Macavity Award for his short story "Evans Tries an O-Level". In 1980, he was elected a member of the by-invitation-only Detection Club. In 2005 Dexter became a Fellow by Special Election of St Cross College, Oxford.

In the 2000 Birthday Honours, Dexter was appointed an Officer of the Order of the British Empire for services to literature. In 2001 he was awarded the Freedom of the City of Oxford. In September 2011, the University of Lincoln awarded Dexter an honorary Doctor of Letters degree.

== Personal life ==
In 1956, he married Dorothy Cooper. They had a daughter, Sally, and a son, Jeremy.

== Death ==
On 21 March 2017 Dexter's publisher, Macmillan, said in a statement "With immense sadness, Macmillan announces the death of Colin Dexter who died peacefully at his home in Oxford this morning."

== Bibliography ==
=== Inspector Morse novels ===
1. Last Bus to Woodstock (1975)
2. Last Seen Wearing (1976)
3. The Silent World of Nicholas Quinn (1977)
4. Service of All the Dead (1979)
5. The Dead of Jericho (1981)
6. The Riddle of the Third Mile (1983)
7. The Secret of Annexe 3 (1986)
8. The Wench is Dead (1989)
9. The Jewel That Was Ours (1991)
10. The Way Through the Woods (1992)
11. The Daughters of Cain (1994)
12. Death Is Now My Neighbour (1996)
13. The Remorseful Day (1999)

=== Novellas and short story collections ===
- The Inside Story (1993)
- Neighbourhood Watch (1993)
- Morse's Greatest Mystery (1993); also published as As Good as Gold
  1. "As Good as Gold" (Morse)
  2. "Morse's Greatest Mystery" (Morse)
  3. "Evans Tries an O-Level"
  4. "Dead as a Dodo" (Morse)
  5. "At the Lulu-Bar Motel"
  6. "Neighbourhood Watch" (Morse)
  7. "A Case of Mis-Identity" (a Sherlock Holmes pastiche)
  8. "The Inside Story" (Morse)
  9. "Monty's Revolver"
  10. "The Carpet-Bagger"
  11. "Last Call" (Morse)

=== Uncollected short stories ===
- "The Burglar" in You, The Mail on Sunday (1994)
- "The Double Crossing" in Mysterious Pleasures (2003)
- "Between the Lines" in The Detection Collection (2005)
- "The Case of the Curious Quorum" (featuring Inspector Lewis) in The Verdict of Us All (2006)
- "The Other Half" in The Strand Magazine (February–May 2007)
- "Morse and the Mystery of the Drunken Driver" in Daily Mail (December 2008)
- "Clued Up" (a 4-page story featuring Lewis and Morse solving a crossword) in Cracking Cryptic Crosswords (2009)

=== Other ===
- Foreword to Chambers Crossword Manual by Don Manley (5th edition, 2014)
- Chambers Book of Morse Crosswords (2006)
- Foreword to Oxford: A Cultural and Literary Companion by David Horan (1999; new edition 2007)
- Cracking Cryptic Crosswords: A Guide to Solving Cryptic Crosswords (2010)
- Foreword to Oxford Through the Lens by Douglas Vernimmen (2016)

== See also ==
- Diogenes Small
- Inspector Morse (1987-2000)
- Lewis (2006-2015)
- Endeavour (2012-2023)
