= Death Is Now My Neighbour =

1996 novel by Colin Dexter

- Cover of the first edition
- Author: Colin Dexter
- Language: English
- Series: Inspector Morse (#12)
- Genre: crime novel
- Publisher: Macmillan
- Publication date: 24 September 1996
- Publication place: United Kingdom
- Media type: Print (Hardcover)
- Pages: 349
- ISBN: 0-333-67570-3
- OCLC: 35774113
- Preceded by: The Daughters of Cain
- Followed by: The Remorseful Day

Death Is Now My Neighbour is a crime novel by Colin Dexter, the 12th novel in the Inspector Morse series.

== Plot summary ==
At 17 Bloxham Drive, Kidlington, Oxfordshire, a pretty 29-year-old physiotherapist named Rachel James is shot almost point blank through the closed blind of her kitchen window early in the morning of 19 February 1996. The shooting took place between 7:00 and 7:30 with a .577 caliber howdah or Lancaster pistol as the pony-tailed young woman was getting breakfast prior to heading to work, her head and upper body silhouetted in the window, as her assailant stood in her backyard.

Unfortunately, none of the other residents of Bloxham Drive can recall seeing anything suspicious that morning, including her immediate neighbour Geoffrey Owens at number 15, a newspaper reporter desperate for the scoop on this breaking news story that happened so close to his home.

Chief Inspector Morse, aided by Detective Sergeant (DS) Lewis, soon discovers a cryptic 'seventeenth-century' love poem by John Wilmot and a photograph of Rachel with a mysterious grey-haired man, clues which lead them to the prestigious Lonsdale College, where the rivalry between Julian Storrs and Dr Denis Cornford for the position of Master, to replace Sir Clixby Bream, is about to turn deadly.

Morse goes to the extreme of employing a known house burglar and lock expert to learn more about Owens. Morse also diagnoses himself with diabetes, and, after going to the local clinic to confirm his condition, is immediately placed in John Radcliffe Hospital for five days.

At the conclusion of the novel, Morse's new love interest, Sister Janet McQueen, a nurse from the hospital, insists that he let Lewis know of his first name and convinces Morse to send Lewis a postcard, which he signs with his full name.

== Continuity ==
Morse divulges his first name, Endeavour (named after Captain James Cook's ship), for the first time in the series.

== Publication history ==
- 1996, London: Macmillan ISBN 0-333-67570-3, Pub date 24 September 1996, Hardback

== Adaptations ==
The novel was adapted for the Inspector Morse television series as the episode of the same title, Death Is Now My Neighbour. It guest starred Richard Briers as Sir Clixby Bream, Maggie Steed as Angela Storrs and Mark McGann as Geoffrey Owens. Since the subplot of Morse's hospitalisation is omitted, his love interest becomes Adele Cecil (played by Judy Loe), a neighbour of Owens and Rachel. The adaptation is largely faithful but changes a few elements: Angela's secret past is changed from being a stripper to having murdered her first husband, Shelly Cornford's suicide is replaced with an accidental fall down stairs, and Morse forces Sir Clixby to leave the area at the end rather than him remaining Master. Also, it is Angela's daughter Diana who provides her with a false alibi rather than receptionist Dawn.
