= Service of All the Dead =

1979 novel by Colin Dexter

- Cover of the first edition
- Author: Colin Dexter
- Language: English
- Series: Inspector Morse series, #4
- Genre: crime novel
- Publisher: Macmillan
- Publication date: 18 October 1979
- Publication place: United Kingdom
- Media type: Print (Hardcover)
- Pages: 256
- ISBN: 0-333-27002-9
- OCLC: 6435109
- Preceded by: The Silent World of Nicholas Quinn
- Followed by: The Dead of Jericho

Service of All the Dead is a crime novel by Colin Dexter, the fourth novel in his Inspector Morse series.

== Setting ==
The novel describes a series of murders in and around the fictional St Frideswide's Church in Cornmarket, Oxford, roughly corresponding to St Mary Magdalen Church, Magdalen Street (rather than to the much smaller St Michael's Church, Cornmarket). The original church of St Frideswide in Oxford was at St Frideswide's Priory, the medieval forerunner of Christ Church. The current church of that dedication is St Frideswide's Church on Botley Road.

== Plot summary ==
The novel is divided into four books. Each book takes its name from a book of the Bible and follows a different style of writing. Notably, the third is in the form of a statement taken from a witness and the fourth mostly takes the form of court proceedings.

=== The First Book of Chronicles ===
The first book details the lives of the characters Lionel Lawson, Harry Josephs, Brenda Josephs, Paul Morris, Ruth Rawlinson and Peter Morris. It doesn't mention Philip Lawson direct but there are several indirect references to him as the tramp. This book sets up the various motives for the plot. It also highlights the jealousy and hatred some of the characters feel towards one another for various reasons.

=== The Second Book of Chronicles ===
Morse is on furlough and by chance happens to visit St Frideswide. There he learns of the murder of Harry Josephs and the subsequent suicide of Lionel Lawson. He finds out that Harry Josephs was poisoned with morphine before being stabbed in the back. This curious fact sparks his attention and he begins to take an active interest in the case. When Inspector Bell, who had previously been in charge of the case, goes down with flu, Morse & Lewis take official charge of the investigation. True to his usual self, Morse comes up with several theories, each of which is shown to be wrong with gathering evidence. Subsequently Morse locates the dead bodies of Paul Morris and Peter Morris by instinct.

When Brenda Josephs is also murdered Morse finally sees the light in the case. He figures out that Ruth would be the next victim and the church (again) would be the scene of the crime. He then places Lewis in an opposite building to watch the church and he hides in it. He confronts the murderer, revealed to be Harry Josephs, atop the church tower. The two men struggle and Harry falls from the tower to his death.

=== The Book of Ruth ===
This book is about the statement given by Ruth to Lewis. She explains how she was hard up for money and agreed to help Lionel Lawson in a plot to murder Harry Josephs. She tries to put it across that she was never involved direct except as a witness to identify the dead man. On reading the statement Morse rejects it as complete perjury and tears it up.

=== The Book of Revelation ===
This book mostly takes the form of court proceedings as Morse reveals how the murderer, Harry Josephs, committed the crimes. He guesses that the first victim was Philip Lawson and Ruth's role was mainly to misidentify the body as that of Harry Josephs. He subsequently explains how Harry murdered the Morrises father and son and then his wife, Brenda. As for the question of Lionel Lawson, Morse suggests it was suicide. Ruth is sentenced to eighteen months’ imprisonment for perjury.

In the first closing scene it is implied that Lionel Lawson was in fact murdered. In the last scene Morse visits Ruth at her flat after her release and they start a romantic relationship.

== Characters ==
- Rev Lionel Lawson – parish priest of St Frideswide's, said to be in his early forties. Throughout the novel, it is suggested that he is possibly gay but Morse concludes that he is not. He is said to be hard working and not very interested in money. He has his share of the family fortune secure in the bank whereas his brother Philip has wasted his share.
- Philip Lawson – brother of Lionel Lawson. While they are not exactly alike, it is suggested that they could pass for each other to someone not familiar to them. He is jobless, has spent his share of family money and is trying to blackmail Lionel to give him money.
- Harry Josephs – a retired commando, now churchwarden at St Frideswide's. Lionel suspects he is stealing from the church collection box. Harry has also gambled and lost heavily on horses. He is having an affair with Ruth.
- Brenda Josephs – Harry's wife, and a nurse at the Radcliffe Infirmary. She is having an affair with Paul Morris, the music teacher/organist. Harry suspects this affair and follows her one day to confirm it. Brenda, in turn, is aware of Harry's affair with Ruth.
- Paul Morris – a widower living with his son, Peter. He is the local music teacher and also organist and choir master at St Frideswide's. He has heard rumours of Lionel Lawson messing with the choir boys. He encourages Peter (a member of the choir) to come to him for help if required. He also tries to start another affair with a girl at school called Carole.
- Peter Morris – the 12-year-old son of Paul, and a member of the church choir.
- Miss Ruth Rawlinson – the church cleaner, who lives with her elderly disabled mother. Morse becomes interested in her during the initial stage of investigation but soon starts to suspect that she is hiding something. Eventually she is the only member of the original plot who is left alive at the end of the book.
- Rev. Keith Meiklejohn – following Lionel Lawson's death, his replacement as vicar of St Frideswide's. Meiklejohn assists Morse and Lewis in their enquiries but is often exasperated at Morse's abrupt demands and lack of respect for his position.

== Publication history ==
- 1979, London: Macmillan ISBN 0-333-27002-9, Pub date 18 October 1979, Hardback

== Television adaptation ==
The book was adapted as the final episode of the first series of the Inspector Morse TV series, guest starring Angela Morant as Ruth, John Normington as Lionel and Maurice O'Connell as Harry. It closely follows the plot of the book but has events occur over a few days rather than several months. Since the series placed the story after The Dead of Jericho, where Bell was promoted to superintendent, the character appears only briefly, as Morse's superior rather than Morse taking over the case from him, with Morse instead involved from the start. Lionel's surname was changed to Pawlen and his brother became Simon. The dedication of the church was changed to become St Oswald's. The postscript of Morse visiting Ruth after her release and them becoming lovers was replaced with him visiting her in her cell after sentencing and the device of Morse telling the press he was on the verge of making an arrest, prompting the attack on Ruth, was removed. The courtroom scene included a gavel on the judges bench, whereas British judges do not use a gavel.
