= Inspector Lewis =

Robert Lewis
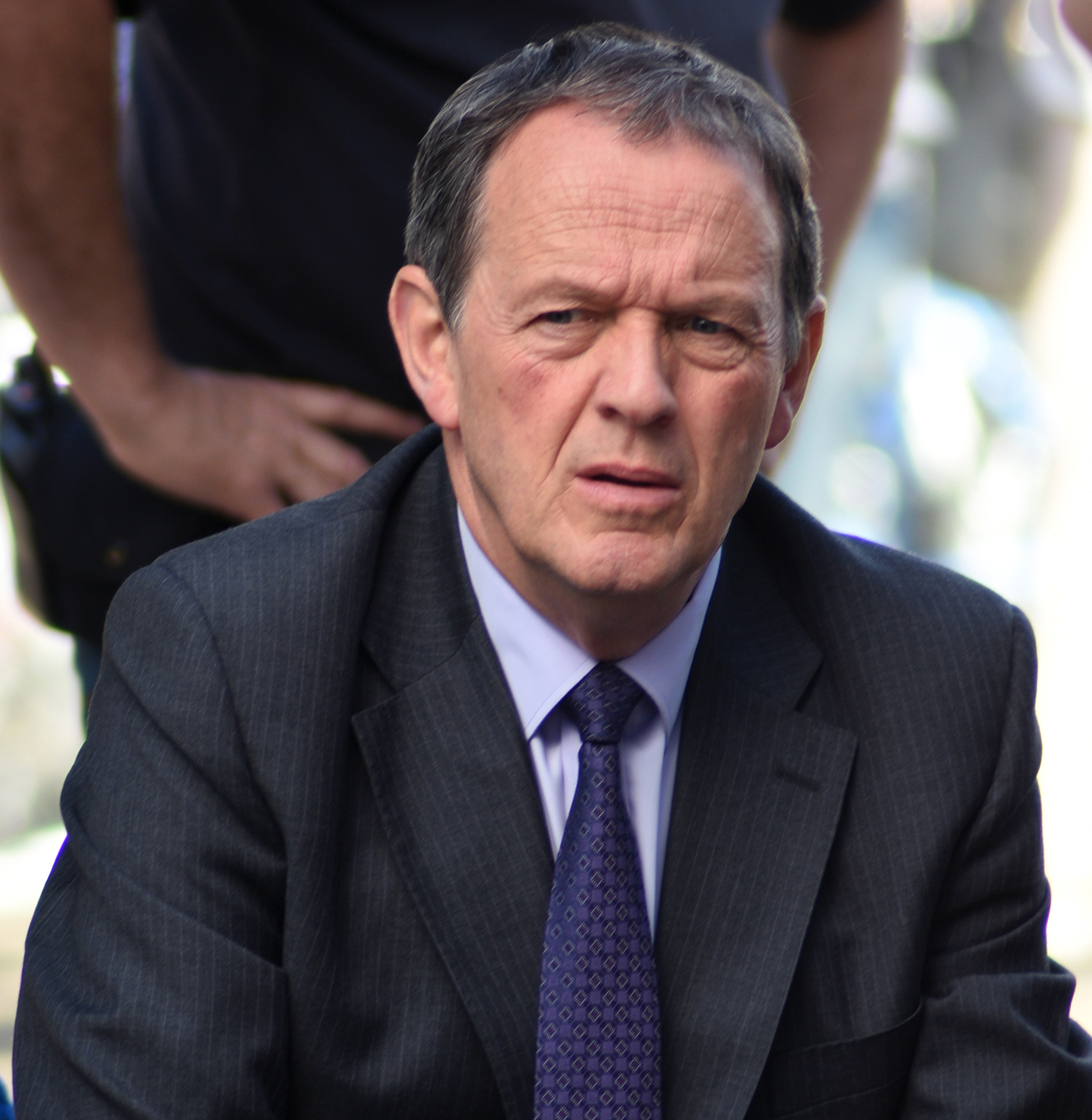
- Kevin Whately as Robbie Lewis in Oxford, August 2015
- First appearance: Last Bus to Woodstock, 1975 novel The Dead of Jericho, 1987 TV
- Last appearance: What Lies Tangled, 2015 TV
- Portrayed by: Kevin Whately (television) (1987–2015)
- Also portrayed by: Christopher Douglas (BBC Radio) (1985); Robert Glenister (BBC Radio) (1992–96); Andrew Bone (stage) (2010); Ivan Wilkinson (stage) (2015); Lee Ingleby (BBC Radio) (2017-2018); Tachia Newall (stage) (2025)

In-universe information
- Aliases: Robbie, Rob, Bertie
- Title(s): Detective Sergeant (novels, Morse); Detective Inspector (Lewis)
- Occupation: Police Detective in Thames Valley Police/Oxfordshire Police CID
- Spouse: Valerie (deceased)
- Children: Lyn Lewis; Patrick Lewis
- Relatives: Andrew Lewis (cousin - deceased)
- Nationality: Welsh (novels); English (television)

Detective Sergeant/Detective Inspector Robert "Robbie" Lewis is a fictional character in the Inspector Morse crime novels by Colin Dexter. The sidekick to Morse, Lewis is a detective sergeant in the Thames Valley Police, and appears in all 13 Morse novels. In the television adaptation, Inspector Morse, he is played by Kevin Whately. Following the conclusion of the series, Whately reprised the role as the lead character in Lewis, in which the character has been promoted to the rank of inspector.

== Character history ==
=== Endeavour ===
Following the murder of Andrew Lewis, Detective Sergeant Morse informs DCI Fred Thursday in 1972 that Lewis' cousin, Robbie, a young police cadet in Newcastle, is handling the arrangements on behalf of his family.

=== Inspector Morse ===
Lewis is a sergeant on the staff of the Thames Valley Police in Oxford, England, and in Inspector Morse is assistant to the eponymous Detective Chief Inspector Morse. Although Lewis's given name is Robert (Robbie), he is rarely referred to as anything but "Sergeant Lewis" or "Lewis".

In the novels Lewis is Welsh; in the TV series he speaks with a very strong Geordie accent. His background and personality – a working class, easygoing family man – is frequently contrasted with that of Morse – Oxford educated, RP-accented, and a life-long bachelor. Morse frequently uses these differences to insult or demean Lewis, perhaps from Morse's point of view in a playful manner, but Lewis is often not amused by the jabs. In his frustration, Lewis is often more in step with their joint superior Chief Superintendent Strange, himself an evident supporter of Lewis; however, despite a great respect towards Strange, Lewis is always unflinchingly loyal to Morse and follows his lead. Morse's dying words, said to Strange, are, "Thank Lewis for me."

In Inspector Morse, Lewis is often shown following a hunch that Morse criticises, and in the end Lewis is usually proved correct, or at least more correct than Morse. Near the end of the television series, Lewis moves on in his career and takes a promotion. With the end of Inspector Morse and the death of its star, John Thaw, Lewis's adventures had seemed to come to an end.

In the episode "The Dead of Jericho", Lewis tells Morse "It's also my birthday". The first victim is killed on 11 June, and this utterance occurs a few days to a week later. This puts Lewis' birthday in mid-June.

Lewis does not make an appearance in the episode "The Wench is Dead", because he is attending an inspector's course.

=== Lewis ===
In the pilot episode, Lewis returns to Oxford from a two-year stint training police in the British Virgin Islands, following the death of his wife Valerie in a hit-and-run collision in London. Lewis still must work partly in the shadow of the now-five-years-dead Inspector Morse, who sometime prior to his death had worked a case involving one of the murder suspects as a juvenile. In the new series, Lewis gains his own junior, Detective Sergeant James Hathaway (played by Laurence Fox), a Cambridge-educated man who joined the police after giving up training for the priesthood. Another staple of the series, pathologist Dr. Laura Hobson (played by Clare Holman), who appears late in the Morse series, continues on through all of the Lewis episodes as a witty part of the team, with a cynical sense of humour and as a romantic interest to him. In the second series, DS Hathaway discovers that career criminal Simon Monkford inadvertently killed Mrs. Lewis when he lost control of a get-away car after a bank robbery; Monkford pleads guilty to manslaughter.

After Robbie retires (and before he returns to work at the request of their superior, Chief Superintendent Jean Innocent, played by Rebecca Front), Hathaway gains his own assistant, Detective Sergeant Elizabeth (Lizzie) Maddox (played by Angela Griffin). Maddox is black, married, smart, and usually very matter of fact, and occasionally shows a sense of humour in her work with James (and Robbie). In one episode, she is almost killed (an attempted murder by the villain of the episode).

The popularity of the one-off episode spurred the continuation of the story into a total of nine series comprising 33 episodes, the most recent airing in 2015. In the latest series, Lewis had retired from the police force, but is brought back as a consultant to work with Hathaway, who is now a detective inspector himself.

== Casting ==
Two notable differences between the Lewis from the novels and Whately's portrayal is that Lewis in the novels is Welsh and in his early sixties. However, Colin Dexter has stated that the younger Lewis is an improvement on the character he created.
