= Porterhouse Blue (TV series) =

1987 British television series

- DVD cover
- Genre: Comedy
- Based on: Porterhouse Blue by Tom Sharpe
- Written by: Malcolm Bradbury
- Directed by: Robert Knights
- Starring: David Jason; Ian Richardson; John Sessions; Charles Gray; Griff Rhys Jones; Paul Rogers; John Woodnutt; Paula Jacobs; Barbara Jefford; Ian Wallace
- Opening theme: Dives in Omnia
- Composer: Rick Lloyd
- Country of origin: United Kingdom
- Original language: English
- No. of seasons: 1
- No. of episodes: 4

Production
- Producer: Brian Eastman
- Cinematography: Dick Pope
- Editor: Barry Peters
- Running time: 200 minutes
- Production companies: Carnival Film and Television; Picture Partnership Productions

Original release
- Network: Channel 4
- Release: 3 June – 24 June 1987

Porterhouse Blue is a 1987 television comedy series adapted by Malcolm Bradbury from the 1974 Tom Sharpe novel of the same name for Channel 4 in four episodes. It starred David Jason as Skullion, Ian Richardson as Sir Godber Evans, Barbara Jefford as his wife Lady Mary, Charles Gray as Sir Cathcart D'Eath, and John Sessions as Zipser. Also appearing were Griff Rhys Jones as Cornelius Carrington, Paula Jacobs as Mrs. Biggs, Bob Goody as Walter, Paul Rogers as the Dean, John Woodnutt as the Senior Tutor, Lockwood West as the Chaplain, Willoughby Goddard as Professor Siblington, Tim Preece as Dr. Messmer, Harold Innocent as the Bursar and Ian Wallace as the Praelector.

== Plot summary ==
For the television series the events of the novel were updated from 1973 to 1986, with Cornelius Carrington having graduated in 1974, rather than 1938, as in the novel.

For the first time in five hundred years, a Master of Porterhouse fails to name his successor on his deathbed before dying. He succumbs to a Porterhouse Blue - a stroke brought about by overindulgence in the college's legendary cuisine. Sir Godber Evans is appointed by the Prime Minister as his successor as a means of removing him from the government. At the sumptuous College Feast complete with swan and an entire roasted ox, Sir Godber, egged on by his zealously liberal wife, Lady Mary, announces sweeping changes to the centuries of college tradition, much to the concern of Skullion and the Fellows, who plan a counter-attack on the proposed contraceptive machines, women students, and self-service canteen.

Meanwhile, the only research graduate student in the college, Lionel Zipser, visits the hard-of-hearing college chaplain and explains his fixation for Mrs Biggs, his middle-aged, large-breasted bedder. As the chaplain is hard of hearing he requires Zipser to use a megaphone. To his intense embarrassment Zipser is overheard by members of the college who gather outside to listen. Mrs Biggs is not within earshot, but nevertheless has sensed that something is up from Zipser's awkward behaviour around her every time she comes to clean his room and especially when she teases him sexually, such as when she asks him to help take off her bright red PVC raincoat in the tight confines of the gyp room.

While Sir Godber congratulates himself on having defeated the traditionalists, investigative journalist Cornelius Carrington is brought in on the pretext of helping both parties, while secretly having his own agenda.

Meanwhile, having been advised to pick up a foreign student so as to slake his lust for Mrs Biggs, Zipser, after a series of frustrating attempts to buy condoms acquires four large boxes by mistake. Concerned that he has technically stolen them, he tries many ways to get rid of them and eventually inflates them with gas from the gas fire in his room and floats them up the chimney, realising that some have become stuck in the chimney while the rest have floated down into the college quadrangle. Fearing for the good name of the college, Skullion spends the night bursting the inflated condoms.

Meanwhile, Mrs Biggs reciprocates Zipser's passion, and sneaks up to his room in the middle of the night and wakes him up. To his amazement she undresses and, despite his protests, promptly enters his bed and lies on top of him. Unfortunately, while undressing, she has lit the gas fire, which takes a short while to ignite the inflated condoms stuck in the chimney, causing an explosion that demolishes the Bull Tower and kills her and Zipser in their moment of passion.

Skullion refuses to open the main gates of college to let the fire engines in and continues to burst the inflated condoms; as a consequence he is dismissed. Skullion visits the bank and discovers that his nest egg of shares inherited from a previous master is worth a fortune. He takes his revenge by giving a shocking revelatory interview on Carrington's live television show. Skullion pleads with Sir Godber to be reinstated and offers his legacy to the college, but is refused on both counts. Skullion thrusts the box containing his legacy to Sir Godber, who in panic steps back and falls against the wall, causing a heavy picture to drop onto his head giving him a fatal injury. Skullion quickly leaves. Two senior academics find the dying Sir Godber who whispers one word: Skullion! They agree that, in accordance with college tradition, Skullion has been named the new Master of Porterhouse.

When Skullion is visited by the college officials with the good news, he thinks they have discovered his involvement in Sir Godber's death. Whilst they are telling him about his promotion, this causes him to suffer a debilitating Porterhouse Blue, with partial paralysis. Nonetheless, he is installed as the Master and his shares are sold to meet the cost of rebuilding the Bull Tower, so Porterhouse's traditions are firmly re-established.

== Production ==
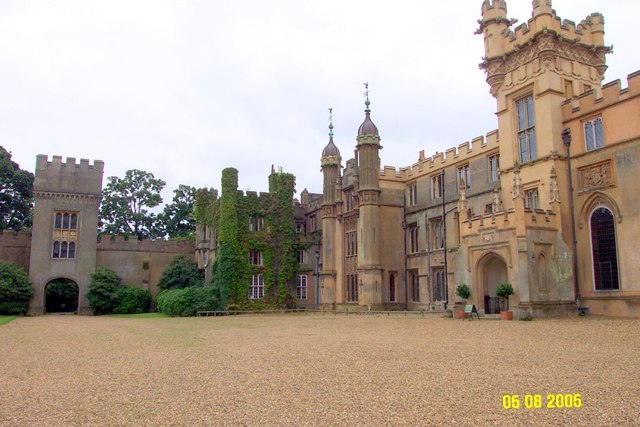
Knebworth House in Hertfordshire stood in for Coft Castle in the series

Sidney Sussex College, Cambridge; Sacrist's Gate on the High Street in Ely near Ely Cathedral in Cambridgeshire stood in for the gate of Porterhouse; Knebworth House as Coft Castle, the home of General Sir Cathcart D'Eath; and the quad at Apethorpe Hall in Northamptonshire were used as locations in the series.

The title song "Dives in Omnia" (Latin for "Rich in Everything") was sung by a cappella group The Flying Pickets.

== Awards ==
The series won an International Emmy and two BAFTA Awards (including Best Actor for David Jason).

== Media ==
The series was released onto Region 2 DVD in 2002 and rereleased in 2008. The series was released onto Region 1 DVD in 2007.

The show was repeated on the UK channel GOLD in 2017 as well as in 2018 and 2020. As of 2026 it is available for streaming in the UK on BritBox, AppleTV & All 4.
