= Lord Jeremy Pimpole =

Fictional character in the novel Grantchester Grind

Lord Jeremy Pimpole is a fictional character created by author Tom Sharpe, a British novelist. The character of Lord Pimpole is first mentioned in Porterhouse Blue (1974), set in the fictitious Porterhouse College in Cambridge. Pimpole went up to Porterhouse as a student in 1959.

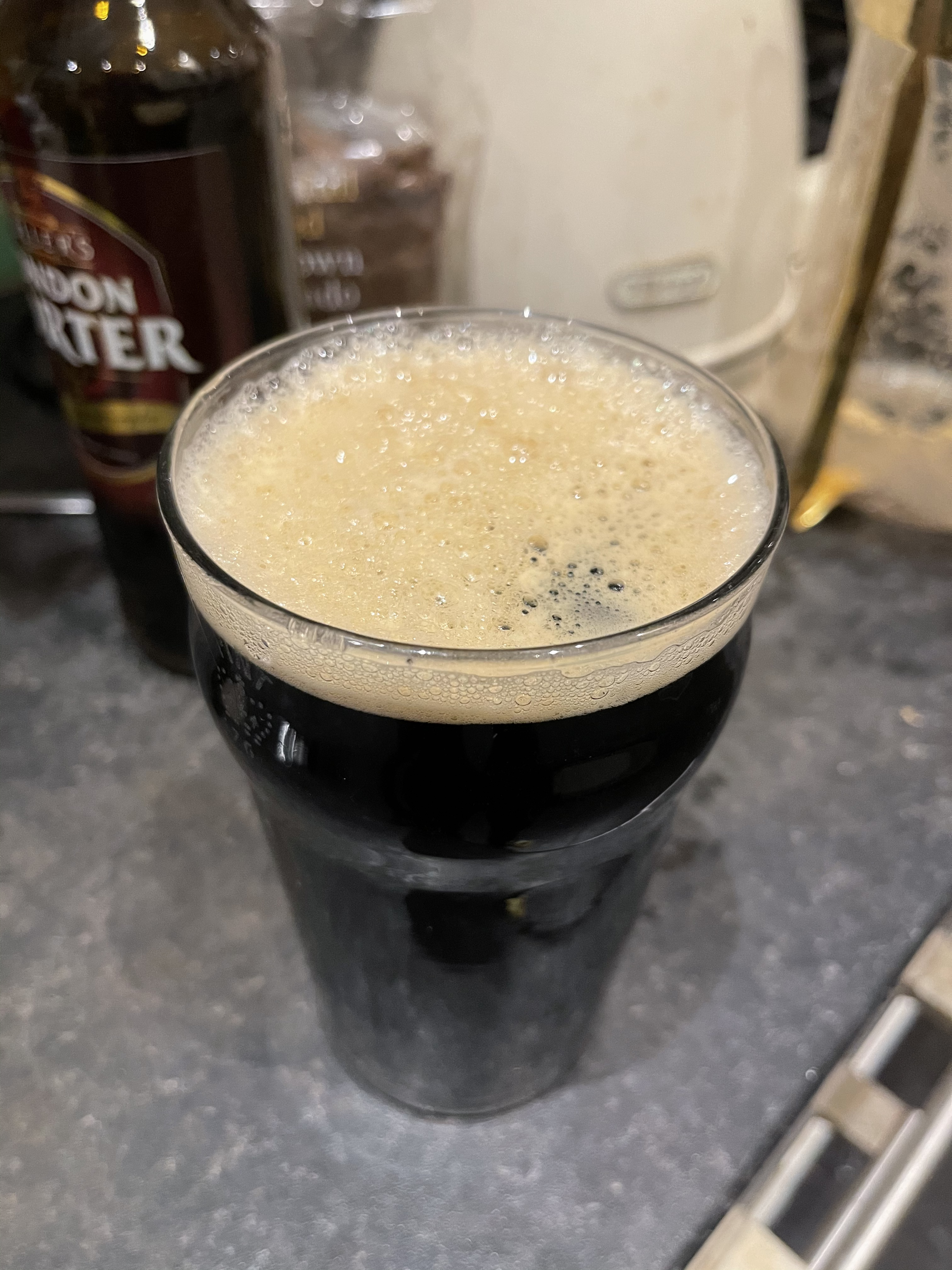
A freshly-mulled pint of Dog's Nose (so called because wet and black), one of the mid-19th century descendants of purl, containing London porter, gin, brown sugar and sometimes also nutmeg

His name, with that of a former student, Sir Launcelot Gutterby, is often chanted to himself by Skullion, the Head Porter, as the mantra "Gutterby and Pimpole", when it seems that standards at the College are slipping. This helps to remind Skullion of the days when students had been proper gentlemen.

In the sequel, Grantchester Grind (1995), the character of Pimpole plays a more central role. In this novel he has changed from the 'delightfully vague and charming young man' of his student days to an unwashed and abusive alcoholic with a sexual predilection for sheep and dogs. Because of his spending, mostly on alcohol, he has lost Pimpole Hall, the ancestral home, and is reduced to living in a gamekeeper's lodge on what had been his family's estate. His favourite drink is Dog's Nose, usually made up of seven ounces of gin to thirteen ounces of beer. Pimpole's version of the drink is made up of 60% gin.

At the end of Grantchester Grind Skullion, who became Master of Porterhouse College on the death of Sir Godber Evans, nominates Lord Pimpole as the next Master of the College.

== See also ==
- Tom Sharpe
- Porterhouse Blue
- Grantchester Grind
- Porterhouse College, Cambridge
- Sir Godber Evans
- Skullion
