= List of fictional Cambridge colleges =

Fictional colleges are perennially popular in modern novels, allowing the author much greater licence when describing the more intimate activities of a Cambridge college and a way of placing events that might not be permitted by actual Cambridge geography.

Below is a list of some of the fictional colleges of the University of Cambridge.

- All Saints College, The Man in Room 17, The Green Man by Kingsley Amis, mentioned briefly in Dirk Gently's Holistic Detective Agency by Douglas Adams and in Dreaming of the Bones by Deborah Crombie.
- Boniface College, Cambridge, Pendennis by William Thackeray, inspired by his time at Cambridge and home to the poet Sprott.
- Brakespeare College, Manalive by G. K. Chesterton
- Fisher College, The Cambridge Murders by Dilwyn Rees, situated between real-life St John's College and Trinity College
- Flopsy College, In the episode Return of the Mummy of children's spy series M.I. High
- Haworth College, Dr Rose Fenemore in Stormy Petrel by Mary Stewart is described as the College's English tutor, though most of the novel is set on the Isle of Mull
- Humber College, Hugo Lamb, narrator of the second chapter in David Mitchell's novel The Bone Clocks, is an undergraduate at Humber, a medieval college in the city centre
- Lancaster College, various books by Simon Raven. Bears more than a passing resemblance to King's College, founded by Henry VI of the House of Lancaster
- Lauds College, various books by Susan Howatch. Fictionally contains Cambridge Cathedral, so is similar to Christ Church, Oxford. Charles Ashworth was a fellow of the College and many other characters studied there. Named after William Laud, controversial 17th century Archbishop of Canterbury
- Marcian College, Raisley Conyngham's old college in In the Image of God by Simon Raven. Located between the Round Church and Portugal Place, i.e. between St John's and Jesus. Described by its head porter as "the least distinguished college in the kingdom, with the possible exception of Hertford College, Oxford"
- Pelby College, spoof college that Cambridge students use as an "unmistakable landmark" when giving directions to tourists. By convention it is located somewhere between Magdalene and St John's.
- Porterhouse College, Porterhouse Blue and Grantchester Grind by Tom Sharpe. The name suggests Peterhouse, though it is also a pun on college porters and porterhouse steaks. It is also reputedly based loosely on Pembroke, Sharpe's alma mater or Corpus Christi which is next door and its location is somewhere near Peterhouse and Pembroke. Despite this, however, filming for the television series took place at Sidney Sussex College. A Porterhouse College in the (fictional) University of Carrbridge, Inverness-shire has been used in University of Cambridge mathematics exam questions.
- Rachel Ambrose College, Christminster, Culture Shock (Duckworth 1988) by Valerie Grosvenor Myer, a graduate of Newnham, and sometime Associate of Lucy Cavendish, which, as a college for mature women students, it most resembles
- St Agatha's College, The Wyndham Case (1993), A Piece of Justice (1995), Debts of Dishonour (2006) and The Bad Quarto (2007) by Jill Paton Walsh, located between Castle Mound and Chesterton Lane
- St Angelicus College, The Gate of Angels (1990) by Penelope Fitzgerald. Situated not far from Christ's Pieces.
- St Barnabas' College, Tomorrow's Ghost (1979) by Anthony Price
- St Bartholemew's College, Nights in White Satin (1999) by Michelle Spring. Located near the police station and New Square, with murders investigated by Laura Principal of Newnham College
- St Bernard's College, Darkness at Pemberley by T. H. White. Loosely disguised version of Queens' College
- St Botolph's College, example college in Cambridge University Computing Service documentation.
- St Bride's College, the setting for much of Charlie Cochrane's Cambridge Fellows Mysteries
- St Cedd's College, various works by Douglas Adams. Based on St John's College, the alma mater of Douglas Adams. The Fourth Doctor (in Doctor Who, script-edited by Adams) was awarded an honorary degree from this college in 1960
- St Dunstan's College, Cambridge, College of Professor Austin Herring, who appears in Chris Addison's The Ape That Got Lucky and Civilisation
- St Ignatius' College, alma mater of Albert Campion in the novels of Margery Allingham; see his minibiography in Sweet Danger.
- St James's College, "'Oh, Whistle, and I'll Come to You, My Lad'" by M. R. James.
- St Martha's College, Matricide at St. Martha's by Ruth Dudley Edwards
- St Martin's College, War Game by Anthony Price
- St Mary's College, The Hills of Varna by Geoffrey Trease
- St Matthew's College, The Green Man by Kingsley Amis, next door to St Catharine's College. Also in various works by Stephen Fry - in which it is a loosely disguised version of Queens' College, revealed by names of bridges and courts
- St Maud's College, in the short-lived BBC sitcom Honey for Tea. Exterior shots are of Clare College
- St Stephen's College, For the Sake of Elena by Elizabeth George, located between Trinity College and Trinity Hall, modelled on the latter. In the BBC adaptation of the Inspector Lynley Mysteries, St John's College was used as the setting. Also referenced in The Proof of my Innocence by Jonathan Coe.
- St Swithin's College, In James Hilton's Random Harvest, the college attended by Charles Ranier, the main character, and a decade later by Harrison, the narrator. Founded in the latter 16th century
- St Thomas's College, the college of a student and historic murder victim in the BBC television comedy drama series Ludwig.
- Saviours’ College, In Sophie Hannah's The Monogram Murders, the college attended by Patrick Ive
- Tudor College, the home of the main characters in The Night Climbers by Ivo Stourton
- Weirdsister College, Magical college, setting of a sequel to The Worst Witch
- An unnamed college in C. P. Snow's Strangers and Brothers series, including The Masters, in which he states that he "never liked geographical inventions such as Christminster", referring to the Oxford surrogate in Thomas Hardy's Wessex.
- An unnamed college in the BBC Radio 4 comedy series High Table, Lower Orders

== See also ==
- Colleges of the University of Cambridge
- List of fictional Oxford colleges
- List of fictional Oxbridge colleges
