= Blott on the Landscape (TV series) =

1985 British TV comedy-drama series

- Blott (David Suchet) in Hoskins' office, with Hoskins (Paul Brooke) and Dundridge (Simon Cadell).
- Genre: Comedy drama
- Based on: Blott on the Landscape by Tom Sharpe
- Written by: Malcolm Bradbury
- Directed by: Roger Bamford
- Starring: George Cole; Geraldine James; Julia McKenzie; David Suchet
- Composer: David Mackay
- Country of origin: United Kingdom
- Original language: English
- No. of series: 1
- No. of episodes: 6

Production
- Executive producer: Brian Eastman
- Producers: Evgeny Gridneff; Sue Whatmough
- Running time: 53 minutes per episode
- Production companies: BBC; Picture Partnership Productions

Original release
- Network: BBC2
- Release: 6 February – 13 March 1985

Blott on the Landscape is a 1985 BBC TV series, adapted by Malcolm Bradbury from the 1975 Tom Sharpe novel of the same name. It was broadcast on BBC2 in six episodes of 50 minutes each between 6 February and 13 March 1985.

== Cast ==
Sir Giles Lynchwood was played by George Cole, with Geraldine James as Lady Maud, Julia McKenzie as Mrs Forthby, David Suchet as Blott, Paul Brooke as Mr Hoskins, Clare Grogan as the receptionist at the Handyman Arms hotel, Simon Cadell as Mr Dundridge, Geoffrey Chater as the Government Minister, Jeremy Clyde as his private secretary Densher, Geoffrey Bayldon as local solicitor Mr Ganglion and Georgine Anderson as Mrs. Bullett-Finch.

Roger Bamford directed and the producer was Evgeny Gridneff. The music was composed by David McKay. The title music, and much of the incidental music, is notable for its faithful portrayal of a brass band, when most instruments were imitated by multivocalist Viv Fisher.

== Locations ==
The series was filmed mainly in the Ludlow area of south Shropshire and north Herefordshire.

Handyman Hall was filmed at Stanage Park, near Heartsease, Powys, a few miles west of Ludlow. The town of Ludlow stood in for the fictitious town of Worford, with a number of pubs and other buildings used there, though the Town Hall used as the courthouse was demolished in 1986. Deddington in Oxfordshire was the filming location for the village of Guildstead Carbonell, where two mock buildings were built in the market place, one of which was demolished in the show. The Unicorn public house was renamed for the show The Royal George. Oxfordshire brewery Hook Norton, in the village of the same name, served as the Handyman brewery where Blott obtains copious supplies of strong ale for the motorway workers. It was a drunk, played by Jimmy Nail, who 'demolished' Guildstead Carbonell.

The Lodge, where Blott lives, was built on land at Blaise Castle Estate near Bristol. Sir Giles is seen drawing the proposed motorway route on his Ordnance Survey road atlas - the page is that of south Shropshire/Herefordshire, but with a few minor amendments made showing names of places used in the book and TV series (for instance, "Worford"- a cross between Worcester and Hereford - instead of "Ludlow"). The maps in the town planning offices show Ludlow and the South Shropshire district, and the map shown at the planning inquiry shows the north Herefordshire/south Shropshire area.

== Changes from the novel ==
In the TV version, a series of flashbacks provides glimpses of Blott's past. Because the series was set ten years later than the book, Blott would have been too young to have served in World War II, so the flashbacks reveal that he was an incompetent Eastern European soldier who was accidentally carried across the Iron Curtain by a balloon, and then taken to England by Lady Maud's father.

== Home media ==
The 1985 televised version was first released in the UK in 1992 by BBC Enterprises as a "Double video pack", on VHS cassettes (BBC V4775). It had a running time of approximately 313 minutes.

The DVD version (Regions 2+4 Pal UK) was released in 2005 by BBC Worldwide, with a running time of approximately 320 minutes.
