= Page Street =

Street in Pimlico, London

Coordinates: 51.4939°N 0.1307°W

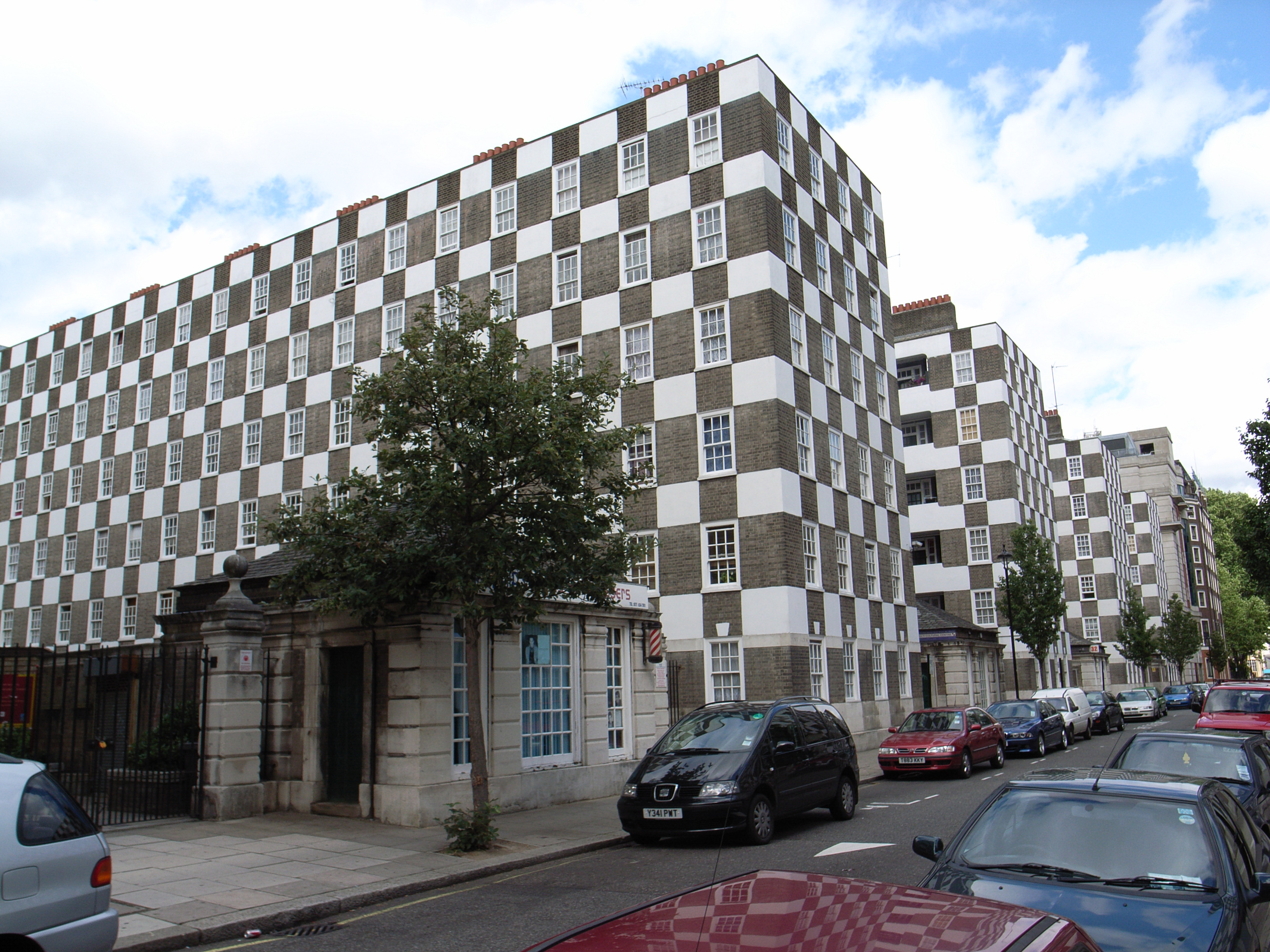
Lutyens flats on Page Street

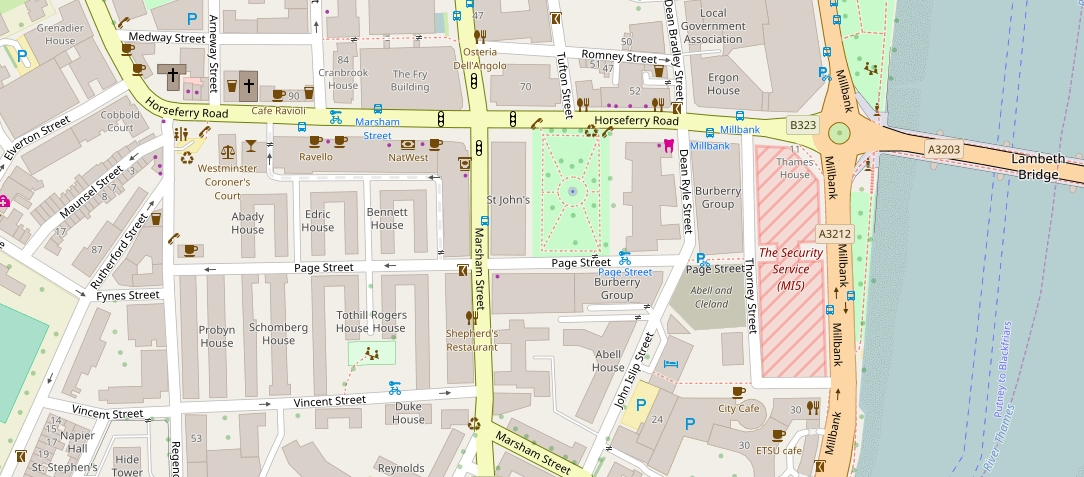
Page Street map

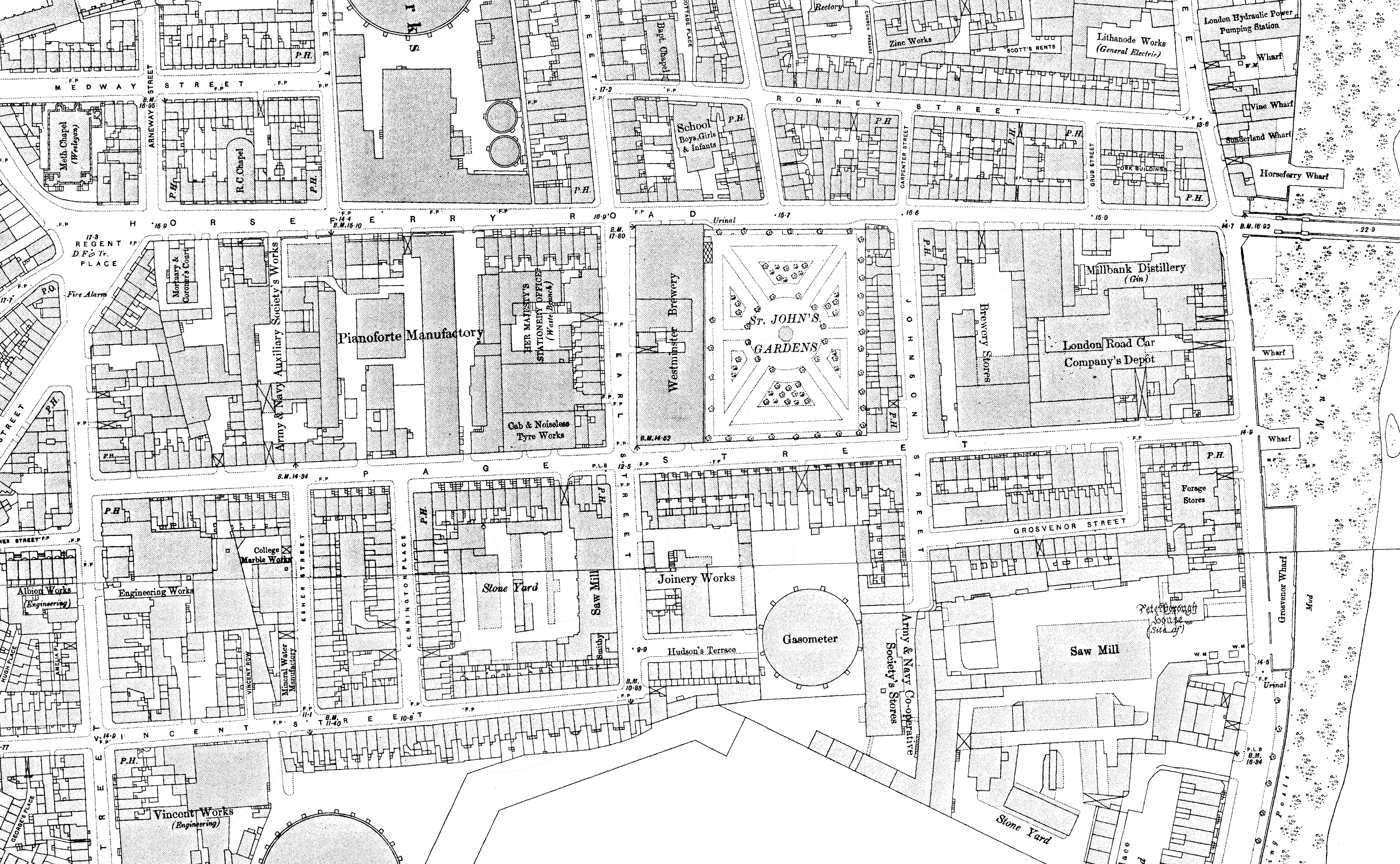
Ordnance Survey map of Page Street in the 1890s before slum clearance and the construction of social housing blocks.

Page Street is a street in Pimlico, in the City of Westminster, that runs from Regency Street in the west to the junction of John Islip Street and Dean Ryle Street in the east, parallel with Horseferry Road. It is crossed midway by Marsham Street.

== History ==
Though mostly undeveloped riverine marsh until the late eighteenth century, as evidenced by Horwood's map of 1792, development was rapid in the nineteenth and the area became a notorious slum. On the night of 6 January 1928 much of the area flooded with loss of life, and later that year the Westminster Medical Officer of Health declared a Clearance Area to remove the slums and improve drainage.

== Social housing ==
The street is notable for its social housing blocks. These are of two phases. The first, facing Regency Street and Page Street were commenced in 1902 and were considered of sufficient significance for the Prince of Wales to ceremonially lay the foundation stone in 1903. They are of red brick, similar in design to the nearby Pimlico Estate developed by the London County Council and the architects were Nathan S. Joseph and Charles James Smithem.

The second phase were designed by Sir Edwin Lutyens who was commissioned as consultant to the Grosvenor Estate, freeholder of the land, who granted a 999-year lease to Westminster and donated £120,000 towards the cost, provided the site was used for "housing for the working class," as part of the Westminster Housing Scheme. The flats have a conventional tenement plan and have striking and unusual chess-board facades of rectangles in buff-grey brick and rendered panels, covering the entirety of their outer facades. Accessed by balconies to the courtyard elevations, in the manner of much social housing of the period, the blocks were built in 1928–30 and front much of the western end of Page Street. The U-shaped internal courtyards face Page Street on the N side but are turned away from the street on the S side. The courtyards are narrower than most of those of London County Council blocks of the period, something which was partly mitigated by the partial demolition of Tothill and Rogers Houses in about 1970, due to war damage, which created a recreational space. As a result of this partial demolition the remaining Lutyens blocks and their lodges and gates were all Listed as early as 1970, when protection of social housing scheme was highly unusual. The landscaped areas are entered through wrought iron gates beside classical pavilion lodges, in typical Lutyens style; the lodges are in Portland stone with grey-buff brick under pyramidal roofs and were formerly small shops and a management office, but are now in a variety of uses. The estate combines an unusual mixture of balcony access tenement architecture and the Lutyens detailing more often associated with the architect's country house architecture. It was Lutyen's only social housing design.

== Other buildings ==
The former Westminster Hospital Nurses Home is located in the street. At the eastern end on the north side is St John's Gardens.

The Paviours Arms public house with its Art Deco interior was located in Neville House until both were demolished in 2003.

Page Street was designated Westminster's 56th conservation area in 2010.
