= Brian Eastman =

British film and TV producer (born 1949)

Brian Robert Eastman (born 3 September 1949, Brighton, UK) is a producer of feature films (such as Shadowlands and Under Suspicion), television drama (such as Agatha Christie's Poirot and Jeeves and Wooster), and stage productions (such as Shadowlands, Misery, Up on the Roof). He has received two BAFTA awards and two international Emmy awards and his productions have received many other awards and nominations. He is a Fellow of the Royal Television Society. He divides his time between the UK and US.

Eastman founded the independent production company Carnival Films and between 1980 and 2006 produced over 300 hours of television drama, eight feature films and 10 stage productions. In 2007 Carnival Films was sold to the Australian company Southern Star. Eastman continues to produce through his new production company, Batway Ltd.

== Early career ==
Eastman was educated at the City of Norwich School and Jesus College, Cambridge. Between 1972 and 1975 he worked for the Royal Philharmonic Orchestra in Concert Management, and between 1976 and 1979 he was the Music Tours Officer for the British Council. His first venture into film making was to make music documentaries.

== Carnival films ==
The company now known as Carnival Films and Television Ltd was founded by Brian Eastman and the director Leszek Burzynski in 1978 and was originally called Picture Partnership Productions (PPP). Eastman and Burzynsky worked together on music documentaries, short films for the cinema and commercials. PPP was one of the first independent companies to be commissioned by the newly created Channel Four television in the UK, and the company's work then concentrated on drama productions.

Burzynsky left the company in 1985 and the company was renamed Carnival Films (and Theatre) Ltd in 1989. At this time Carnival also expanded its activities into stage productions.

In the mid 1990s the Australian company Southern Star acquired a shareholding in Carnival.

In 2005 Gareth Neame joined Carnival as managing director and in 2006 Southern Star became the owners of the company. At this point Brian Eastman left Carnival, which was subsequently sold to NBC Universal.

== Television productions ==
Between 1988 and 1994 he was joined at Carnival by Betty Willingale, following her retirement from the BBC. In the detective genre Eastman produced 70 hours of Agatha Christie's Poirot starring David Suchet; Rosemary and Thyme, starring Felicity Kendal and Pam Ferris, Anna Lee starring Imogen Stubbs. In action/adventure he produced 40 hours of Bugs, and in comedy drama he produced the adaptations of Tom Sharpe's novels Blott on the Landscape and Porterhouse Blue.

He produced the mini-series Traffik written by Simon Moore, which subsequently was adapted into a feature film directed by Steven Soderbergh. Other mini-series included The Big Battalions and The Fragile Heart for Channel Four, and Oktober, starring Stephen Tompkinson, for ITV. For TNT in the US, and the BBC, he produced The Grid, and for NBC in the US, and SKY, he produced The Tenth Kingdom.

== Feature films ==
With Richard Attenborough, Eastman produced the feature film version of William Nicholson's Shadowlands, starring Anthony Hopkins and Debra Winger. Other movies with which he has been involved include Under Suspicion, starring Liam Neeson and Laura San Giacomo, and Wilt starring Mel Smith and Griff Rhys Jones.

== Stage productions ==
Eastman's first stage production was Up on the Roof which was nominated for an Olivier Best Musical award. He was then joined at Carnival by Andrew Welch and together they produced Shadowlands, Misery etc. (Full list below)

== Recent activities ==
Eastman started a new company, Batway Ltd, to concentrate on stage productions. Again working with Andrew Welch, he revived Shadowlands at Wyndhams Theatre in London, starring Charles Dance and Janie Dee. He co-produced the UK tour of Our House, the Madness musical, and presented in the West End the stage adaptation of Girl with a Pearl Earring and a new adaptation of Treasure Island. In January 2010 he presented the world premiere of Jane Prowse's adaptation of Jane Juska's A Round-Heeled Woman at the Theater Artaud in San Francisco starring Sharon Gless.

== Personal life ==
Eastman is married to Christabel Albery, an avid gardener, for whom he created the gardener-detectives series Rosemary & Thyme. They have homes in London and Santa Monica, California.
