= Riotous assembly =

Riotous assembly may refer to:

- riot, a form of civil disorder
- Riotous Assembly, a novel by Tom Sharpe
