= Anna, Schmidt und Oskar =

Anna, Schmidt und Oskar is a German television program from the mid-1990s that serves a similar niche as Sesame Street does in the United States. It is aimed at foreign children who live in Germany and are learning German as a second language.

== Plot ==
The show concerns the exploits of Anna, a young music student, who is forced to take care of Mr. Schmidt, a senile old man with magical powers, when her mother, Mr. Schmidt's former caretaker, falls ill.

Oskar is a stray dog who Mr. Schmidt adopts. At first, the pair fail to connect, but eventually Oskar is able to know exactly what his master is talking about, as viewed by speech bubbles which appear above the dog's head.

As the show progresses, Anna becomes more absorbed in Mr. Schmidt's crazy world. The running joke is that Anna must keep returning to Mr. Schmidt's house to retrieve a plate, which she never actually does.

== Goals ==
The show has two primary aims:

- To teach children how to speak German
- To teach German children socially accepted customs

The latter is best displayed through the door spider (Türspinne). Every time someone opens the door to Mr. Schmidt's house, the door spider instructs them to close the door (Tür zu!). This is supposed to teach German children that it is customary in Germany to close a door after entering a room, as Germans believe open doors produce drafts which might compromise one's health..
