= Indecent Exposure (novel) =

1973 novel by Tom Sharpe

- First edition
- Author: Tom Sharpe
- Language: English
- Publisher: Secker & Warburg
- Publication date: 1973
- Publication place: United Kingdom
- Pages: 248
- ISBN: 0-436-45801-2
- Preceded by: Riotous Assembly
- Followed by: Porterhouse Blue

Indecent Exposure is a satirical novel by British writer Tom Sharpe, originally published in 1973. The sequel to Riotous Assembly, the author's debut novel, this story also lampoons the South African police under apartheid.

== Plot summary ==
Set in the fictional South African town of Piemburg, where local police, headed by Kommandant van Heerden, Lieutenant Verkramp and Konstabel Els, are determined to maintain the government policy of apartheid. While the Kommandant is absent at the country home of a snobbish upper class English couple, Lieutenant Verkramp enlists the help of a female psychiatrist to provide the police garrison with aversion therapy, with the aim of stopping them from fraternising with black girls. However, this takes a disastrous turn and causes the entire police force of the town to identify as homosexuals. Summoned back from his vacation, Kommandant van Heerden endeavors to reinstate a sense of order.
