= Skullion =

Fictional character in the novel Porterhouse Blue

David Jason as 'Skullion' in Porterhouse Blue

Skullion is a central character in Porterhouse Blue (1974) and Grantchester Grind (1995), two novels about life in the fictitious Porterhouse College at Cambridge by British novelist Tom Sharpe. For centuries, Porterhouse College has been renowned for its cuisine, the prowess of its rowers, and the low level of its academic achievements. Since the college was founded there have been Skullions at Porterhouse.

Skullion is the head porter at the college, a responsibility he has held for many years and which he takes very seriously.

== Head porter of Porterhouse College ==
Cover of 'Porterhouse Blue'

James Skullion's first contact with Porterhouse College came when, as a young boy, he carried the students' cases for sixpence when they arrived at the railway station at Cambridge, running beside their cabs to help unload them at the college. He became a porter at Porterhouse in 1928 and served in the Royal Marines during the Second World War. He became the head porter in 1949. In the books, Skullion has worked at the college for forty-five years, has served seven masters, and sees himself as a link with the college's great and glorious past; as such he regards it as his duty to maintain the standards of bygone years. Porterhouse is not an academic college; rather, it is a club for gentlemen, where admission depends on rank and wealth and where degrees can be bought. This often involves a brighter substitute from another college being paid to take the place of the Porterhouse student in the examination. Based on their fraudulent degrees, many of these students have gone on to obtain positions of great power in government and industry. These men are known as 'Skullion's Scholars' . He keeps their names on a list, knowing it will be useful one day.

When the master of Porterhouse dies without naming his successor, the College Visitor, the Queen, takes the prime minister's advice and appoints Sir Godber Evans (a former student at the college) as his successor. Sir Godber, having been pressured by his wealthy left-wing wife, Lady Mary, announces sweeping changes to the centuries of college tradition, much to the concern of Skullion and the Fellows, who plan a counter attack to the proposed contraceptive machines, women students, and a self-service canteen. He also intends to sell the row of houses where the college servants live.

Skullion contemptuously remembers Sir Godber from his student days as not being a gentleman as he had been educated at a grammar school. Skullion is sacked for insolence by Sir Godber, the new Master, and is forced to leave his home. He appears live on a television programme in which he reveals all of the college's murky secrets, and refers to his list of 'Skullion's Scholars' , to the horror of Sir Godber and the college's Senior Fellows, but to the amusement of everybody else.

Skullion returns to Cambridge, determined to ask for his job back in return for donating a large inheritance he has received to the college. He confronts Sir Godber who treats him with pity and contempt. This angers Skullion's sense of pride, and he advances menacingly on Sir Godber, who, backing away in fear, trips and bangs his head. He is found dying by the Dean and Senior Tutor and tries to tell them who is responsible. They misunderstand his meaning and believe that he has named Skullion as his successor as Master. They inform Skullion of this and he suffers a 'Porterhouse Blue' , a stroke, but survives and is installed as master of the college.

== Master of Porterhouse ==
Cover of Grantchester Grind

In Grantchester Grind, the wheel-chair bound Skullion is still Master, but is showing signs of physical frailty. The mystery surrounding the death of the previous Master, Sir Godber Evans, prompts his widow, the millionairess Lady Mary, to instigate a plan to investigate the death through a planted Fellow, Dr Purefoy Osbert, backed by a large, anonymous donation to Porterhouse.

At the same time, the Dean decides to look for a new Master for the college, preferably a wealthy one, to replace Skullion; he drives around the country visiting Old Porterthusians (previous students at Porterhouse), including Lord Jeremy Pimpole, (who is now a chronic alcoholic with a sexual predilection for sheep and dogs), in the hope that he will find one is willing to become Master. None are suitable. Meanwhile, the College Bursar is contacted by the American media and drug-running billionaire Edgar Hartang, who seems to be interested in supporting the college without clarifying what it is he wants in return. Knowing that Dr Osbert is eavesdropping, Skullion admits that he murdered Sir Godber Evans. He is immediately and secretly sent to Porterhouse Park, an unpleasant retirement home for the college's mad or troublesome Fellows. He escapes from here with the assistance of Dr Osbert, and returns to Porterhouse and confronts the Fellows. As is his right as Master, Skullion nominates the new master of the college, the alcoholic Lord Pimpole.

== Skullion in film ==
In 1987 Porterhouse Blue was adapted for television as Porterhouse Blue by Malcolm Bradbury for Channel 4, with David Jason playing the role of Skullion, and winning a BAFTA for Best Actor for the role.
