= List of fictional Oxbridge colleges =

This is a list of fictional colleges of either:

1. the universities referred to collectively as Oxbridge, but where the specific university is not specified or known;
2. fictional institutions spanning both Oxford and Cambridge universities; or
3. a fictional Oxbridge University

Boniface College, Oxbridge
Pendennis by William Thackeray, inspired by his time at Cambridge and home to the poet Sprott.
Fernham College, Oxbridge
A Room of One's Own by Virginia Woolf, based on Newnham College, established in 1871 as the first exclusive women's college at Cambridge University.
Footlights College, Oxbridge
from which came a team of participants in an imitation of University Challenge in an episode of The Young Ones called "Bambi". Stephen Fry, Hugh Laurie, Emma Thompson and Ben Elton played contestants: "Lord Snot", "Lord Monty", "Miss Money-Sterling", and "Mr. Kendall-Mintcake", respectively. Fry, Laurie and Thompson were all students at Cambridge and members of its Footlights Dramatic Club.
Omnibus College
in Middlemarch, Chapter 52, where Fred Vincy takes his bachelor's degree.
Pembridge College, Oxbridge
"The Passing of Sherlock Holmes", a 1948 Sherlock Holmes parody by E. V. Knox
St Luke's College
"The Adventure of the Three Students", a Sherlock Holmes story by Arthur Conan Doyle.

== See also ==
- List of fictional Cambridge colleges
- List of fictional Oxford colleges
