= Vintage Stuff =

1982 novel by Tom Sharpe

- First edition (publ. Secker & Warburg)
- Author: Tom Sharpe
- Language: English
- Publisher: Secker & Warburg
- Publication date: 1982
- ISBN: 0-436-45810-1 (first edition)
- Dewey Decimal: 823.914
- LC Class: PR6069.H345 V5

Vintage Stuff is a novel of British satirical writer Tom Sharpe which was written and originally published in 1982. Set in Groxbourne, a parody of Bloxham School where Sharpe received his education, the novel follows the (mis)adventures of Peregrine Clyde-Brown.

== Plot summary ==
Peregrine Roderick Clyde-Brown is a guileless and dim-witted teenager, who takes every phrase or word spoken to him literally. This is where the author displays his skill in playing with the English language, His attorney father (wishing to get rid of him) and his mother (having high hopes on him as a 'late bloomer') finally manage to get him admitted to a boarding private school called Groxbourne. In a school, asynchronous to its surrounding, Peregrine's tendency for unflinchingly taking orders and having negligible individual thought (and his becoming a crack shot on the school's rifle range) seem perfect for a promising career in the British Army. It is here at Groxbourne that Peregrine meets Gerald Glodstone, a teacher like others in the school, whose teaching methods involve using the cane, but who is also addicted to early- and pre-twentieth century adventure fiction. After Glodstone drags the loyal and obedient boy off to France on a seemingly romantic quest to rescue a French countess (a "quest" set into motion by 'Slimey' Slymne, another Groxbourne teacher who hates Glodstone), Peregrine ends up storming a French castle where he commits havoc and even murder, the effects of which would span countries and affect everyone around him.
