= The Throwback (novel) =

1978 novel by Tom Sharpe

- First edition (publ. Secker & Warburg)
- Author: Tom Sharpe
- Language: English
- Publisher: Secker & Warburg
- Publication date: 1978
- ISBN: 0-436-45807-1 (first edition)
- Dewey Decimal: 823.914
- LC Class: PZ4.S5323 Th

The Throwback is a 1978 satirical novel by Tom Sharpe.

It has been released as a recorded book in two formats: in an abridged version by HarperCollins Audio read by Simon Callow (ISBN 0001050761) and unabridged by ISIS Audio Books read by Geoffrey Matthews (ISBN 185695692X)

== Plot ==
The plot is based around the ancient Flawse family, landed gentry based at the falling-down Flawse Hall, (near "Flawse Fell") in the wilds of Northumberland, just south of the Anglo-Scottish border. The single remaining family member is a cantankerous octogenarian named Edwin Tyndale Flawse. His illegitimate grandson Lockhart (a.k.a. "the Bastard") combines sexual and educational innocence with an alarming propensity for violence when he or his wife is threatened. The old man was born in the late 19th century, and his main aim in the very autumn years of his life is to find the father of his bastard grandchild and flog him to within an inch of his life.

The plot involves the pair making a double marriage while on a cruise, Edwin to the grasping middle-aged Mrs. Sandicott (who desires to marry a very rich old man with as short a lifespan remaining as possible) and Lockhart to her innocent and beautiful daughter Jessica (who knows as little of real life as he does and wants nothing more than a stereotypical male hero).

One plot strand has the older couple moving to Flawse Hall; the pair immediately begin fighting as she realises that the old man has no immediate intention of dying and that Flawse Hall is not the aristocratic seat she imagined. The house has no electricity or modern appliances, and is located miles from the nearest town of Black Pockrington and the nearest railway station of Hexham, and thanks to a clause in her new husband's will which states that although she will inherit everything after he dies, she can never leave or else she'll forfeit the entire estate. The other strand has Lockhart and Jessica moving to Sandicott Crescent in the south London suburb of Purley and fighting an innocents' battle together against the modern world. Lockhart is not at home in his new suburban environment and subsequently loses his job in his mother-in-law's accountancy firm (courtesy of and in retaliation by his mother-in-law when Edwin's will includes another clause stating that if Lockhart ever finds his natural father the entire Flawse estate and inheritance immediately reverts to him) and longs for home. Unable to get another job since he doesn't statistically exist (thanks to his grandfather's refusal to register him with a birth certificate or with the National Health Service), Lockhart embarks on a prolonged, complicated, merciless and ultimately successful campaign to evict the tenants of the houses owned by Jessica so that they can be sold.

The finale has the two strands reunited back in Northumberland and involves the inevitable discovery that the spirit of the Flawse family lives on in "the Bastard" but is spiced up by several deaths, the inclusion of a human taxidermist, extensive use of sound equipment and a vicious battle with the taxmen and "the excise men" (Her Majesty's Customs and Excise Department).
