= Grantchester Grind =

- First edition cover
- Author: Tom Sharpe
- Publisher: Hodder & Stoughton
- Publication date: December 1995
- ISBN: 978-0-436-59671-1

Grantchester Grind is a novel written by British novelist Tom Sharpe. It follows on from the story in Porterhouse Blue of the fictitious Porterhouse College, Cambridge.

== Plot ==
Porterhouse is a college which had an incident involving a bedder and the college's only research graduate student which caused the Bull Tower to be severely damaged. Since the college's funds were exhausted by a previous bursar with a tendency to gamble, one of the story's central themes is guided by the Senior Members' attempts to acquire funds for the college.

The new Master, Skullion, the previous Head Porter of the college, is frail after a stroke (or a 'Porterhouse Blue', hence the previous book's title) and the issues surrounding the death of the previous Master, Sir Godber Evans, prompt his widow to instigate a plan to investigate the death through a planted Fellow, backed by a large, anonymous donation to the college.

Meanwhile, the Dean of the college takes it upon himself to visit prosperous Old Porterthusians (previous members of Porterhouse) in the hope that one is willing and able to become Master if and when Skullion cannot continue. At the same time, the current Bursar is contacted by an American media mogul who seems to be interested in supporting the college without clarifying what it is he wants in return. At the end of the novel the alcoholic Lord Jeremy Pimpole is appointed as Master of the college.

Incidents from Ancestral Vices, another Tom Sharpe novel, are mentioned in crossover.

== Reception ==
Wayne Moriarty, writing for the Edmonton Journal, called Grantchester Grind "a wondrously inventive book that rings as funny as anything Sharpe has written in the past". He found the books' protagonists to be "typical of all Sharpe characters -- basically good people who opt to cut corners, cheat a little bit, maybe practise modest deceit. The end result of their cheating and deception is always disaster -- some of the blackest mayhem ever written."

== Publishing history ==
- Tom Sharpe (1995). Grantchester Grind. Andre Deutsch Secker & Warburg. ISBN 0-436-20289-1.

== See also ==
- Porterhouse Blue
- Sir Godber Evans
- Skullion
- Lord Jeremy Pimpole
