= The Paviours Arms =

Demolished pub in Westminster, London

Coordinates: 51.4929°N 0.1285°W

Saloon bar of The Paviours Arms showing Art Deco design

The Paviours Arms was a public house in Neville House, Page Street, City of Westminster, that was said to be London's most complete Art Deco pub.

The pub was designed by T.P. Bennett & Son, around 1937. It closed in May 2003 in order for the owner, Land Securities Trillium, to redevelop Neville House. The pub was close to the Houses of Parliament, making it popular within politicians, leading to an Early Day Motion in April 2003 signed by 67 members of Parliament calling on the developers and Westminster City Council to protect it from destruction. It was, nonetheless, demolished along with the rest of Neville House later in 2003.
