= Wilt (novel) =

1978 comedic novel by Tom Sharpe

- Author: Tom Sharpe
- Audio read by: Andrew Sachs, Nigel Graham
- Language: English
- Genre: Comedic novel
- Published: Secker & Warburg
- Publication date: 1976
- Followed by: The Wilt Alternative

Wilt is a comedic novel by Tom Sharpe, first published by Secker and Warburg in 1976. Later editions were published by Pan Books, and Overlook TP. The novel was a bestseller. Its success led to the author writing several sequels. The descriptions of teaching in the novel are drawn from Sharpe's own experience as a lecturer at the Cambridge College of Arts and Technology.

== Plot introduction ==
Henry Wilt is a demoralized and professionally under-rated assistant lecturer who teaches literature to uninterested construction apprentices at a technical college in East Anglia. Years of henpecking and harassment by his physically powerful but emotionally immature wife Eva leave him with dreams of killing her in various gruesome ways. But a string of unfortunate events (including one involving an inflatable plastic female doll) start Henry on a farcical journey. Along the way he finds humiliation and chaos, which ultimately lead him to discover his own strengths and some level of dignity. All the while he is pursued by the tenacious police inspector Flint, whose plodding skills of detection and deduction interpret Wilt's often bizarre actions as heinous crimes.

== Characters ==
- Henry Wilt, title character
- Eva Wilt, Henry's wife
- Inspector Flint, senior police officer
- Sergeant Yates, police officer
- Gaskell Pringsheim, visiting American biochemist
- Sally Pringsheim, Gaskell's sexually liberated wife
- Mr. Morris, Head of Liberal Studies
- Peter Braintree, Lecturer in English
- Dr. Board, Head of Modern Languages
- Dr. Mayfield, Head of Sociology
- Reverend St. John Froude

== Adaptations ==
- In 1989 the novel was adapted for the film Wilt (titled The Misadventures of Mr. Wilt in North America).
- The book was released in two audiobook formats: abridged by HarperCollins Audio Books and read by Andrew Sachs (ISBN 0001046705), and unabridged by ISIS Audio Books and read by Nigel Graham (ISBN 1856955257).

== Sequels ==
Tom Sharpe wrote several sequels and additional works featuring Henry Wilt:

- The Wilt Alternative (1979)
- Wilt on High (1984)
- Wilt Omnibus (1996 collection of the first three Wilt novels)
- Wilt in Nowhere (2004)
- The Wilt Inheritance (2010)
