= Wilt (film) =

- DVD cover
- Directed by: Michael Tuchner
- Written by: Andrew Marshall; David Renwick; Tom Sharpe (novel)
- Produced by: Brian Eastman
- Starring: Griff Rhys Jones; Mel Smith; Alison Steadman; Diana Quick
- Cinematography: Norman G. Langley
- Edited by: Chris Blunden
- Music by: Anne Dudley
- Production companies: London Weekend Television; Talkback Productions
- Distributed by: Rank Film Distributors
- Release date: 3 November 1989 (UK)
- Running time: 92 min
- Country: United Kingdom
- Language: English
- Box office: $74,483 £2,790,603 (UK)

Wilt, released in North America as The Misadventures of Mr. Wilt, is a 1989 British comedy film directed by Michael Tuchner and starring Griff Rhys Jones, Mel Smith, Alison Steadman, and Diana Quick. It is an adaptation by LWT of the 1976 novel Wilt by author Tom Sharpe. The story follows the comic misadventures of the eponymous Henry Wilt as he is accused of the murder of his wife when she suddenly goes missing after a party at a friend's house where they have a very public argument.

Produced by London Weekend Television and Talkback Productions, the film was released in the United Kingdom by Rank Film Distributors on 3 November 1989.

== Plot summary ==
Henry Wilt is a demoralised and professionally under-rated assistant lecturer at a technical college in Mid Anglia who is dominated by his psychologically immature wife Eva and thus fantasises about murdering her. During a night walk to relieve his frustrations, he accidentally busts an undercover operation by local police Inspector Flint, earning him the latter's undivided attention.

Three weeks afterwards, something that looks like a body is found in a construction foundation on the college grounds. Since its appearance coincides with Eva Wilt's mysterious disappearance the night before, and with the Wilts' abandoned car found nearby, Henry is quickly suspected and investigated for murder by Flint. Pleading innocence, Henry relates that the night before, he and Eva had attended a party hosted by their wealthy friends, Hugh and his glamorous wife Sally. Sally, who has grown tired of Hugh and has turned lesbian, wished to win Eva over to her side; when Henry caught her attempting to seduce his unsuspecting wife and confronted her in private, he ended up accidentally knocking himself out. Exploiting this opportunity, Sally stripped Henry down and tied an inflatable sex doll to him. When Eva saw him trying to wrest himself free, she was scandalised and fled to Sally, who subsequently (and unknown to the rest of Eva's social environment) invited her to a yacht trip on the local river. After being liberated, the humiliated Henry dumped the doll into the wet foundations at the building site.

Even though the evidence and the witness testimonies are ambiguous at best, Flint becomes obsessively fixated on the idea that Henry is the dangerous mass murderer currently wanted by the police. That attitude is exacerbated even when the doll is recovered from the construction site, since Flint believes it to be a decoy set up by Henry and Eva's body was disposed of elsewhere. Wilt unexpectedly incriminates himself as a result of a recording of his "fantasy musings" from a wire-tap that fell off Flint on his way to the "undercover bust" earlier. Wilt then confesses to having returned to the scene of the party and to have carried out a triple murder, disposing of the bodies at the local sausage factory. When it is pointed out to Flint that the signed confession is in the name of "Sweeney Todd", Wilt is released due to a lack of solid evidence. Even though Henry has been cleared, Flint continues shadowing him.

In the meantime, Eva learns from Hugh about Sally's designs on her and her set-up of Henry. Fleeing the boat, she calls Henry from a nearby church and apologises to him, asking him to pick her up. Unbeknownst to her, the church's priest is actually the wanted mass murderer. As he prepares to kill Eva, Henry tries to come to her aid, only to be hindered by Flint. After they fight off the mad priest, Flint holds Henry and Eva at gunpoint, but his wild murder accusations are quickly deflated by Henry's alleged victims turning up alive, and the priest is arrested by an undercover officer. Reconciled with his wife, Henry joins Eva's tai chi class for neurosis therapy, where he finds Flint, who has left the police and now works for a private security firm, as a new member to sort out his own psychological issues.

== Cast ==
Actor	Role
Griff Rhys Jones	Henry Wilt
Mel Smith	Inspector Flint
Alison Steadman	Eva Wilt
Diana Quick	Sally
Jeremy Clyde	Hugh
Roger Allam	Dave
David Ryall	Rev. Froude
Roger Lloyd-Pack	Dr. Pittman
Dermot Crowley	Braintree
John Normington	Treadaway
Josephine Tewson	Miss Leuchars
Ken Drury	Inspector Farmiloe

== Box office ==
The film spent one week at number one in the UK and went on to gross £2,790,603.
