= Julius Fromm =

Polish-German entrepreneur, chemist and inventor

- Born: 17 August 1883; Konin, Kingdom of Poland
- Died: 12 May 1945 (aged 62); London, United Kingdom
- Citizenship: Poland, Germany
- Occupations: Chemist and businessman

Julius Fromm (4 March 1883 – 12 May 1945) was a Polish-German chemist and entrepreneur who invented the seamless rubber condom. Owing to his Jewish heritage, his company and personal property was stolen by the Nazis in aryanization when he left Germany for England in 1939. His legacy was not easily reclaimed by his relatives after the war however.

== Biography ==
Fromm was born in the town of Konin, Kalisz Governorate, the Kingdom of Poland. His parents were both Polish Jews and when Julius was ten years old his family left for Berlin in search of a better life. There, the family made a living by rolling cigarettes as many Eastern European Jews of Berlin did at the time. Julius's parents died young, so he was forced to take care of himself and his six siblings from the age of fifteen. As mechanization gradually replaced manual production, Fromm started attending evening classes in chemistry.

With World War I, Germany experienced a rapid liberalization of sexual values and sexually transmitted diseases spread rapidly. During this time, the majority of condoms were still made of "skin": chemically treated intestine or bladder. Rubber condoms were also available; they were made by wrapping raw rubber sheets around molds, then dipping them in a solution to vulcanize the rubber. In 1912, Fromm invented the cement dipping method, which made a thinner, seamless condom. Instead of working with rubber as a solid material, it was mixed with gasoline or benzene. This made it a liquid in which molds could be dipped. Fromm patented his invention in 1916. Mass production started in 1922 and was a great success—Fromms Act, as they were called, becoming the first brand-name condoms—which allowed the entrepreneur soon to open up branches in Denmark, the United Kingdom, Poland, and the Netherlands. Fromms became a synonym for condom in Germany. In 1920, Fromm was naturalized a German citizen. In 1928, the first condom vending machines were installed by Fromm's company, but the ministry of the interior only allowed to advertise the hygienic advantages of condoms, not the condom's use as a contraceptive, because it feared a further decrease of the birth rate. The company also produced several other elastomeric products such as rubber gloves, baby bottle nipples and hot water bottles.

== Nazi period ==
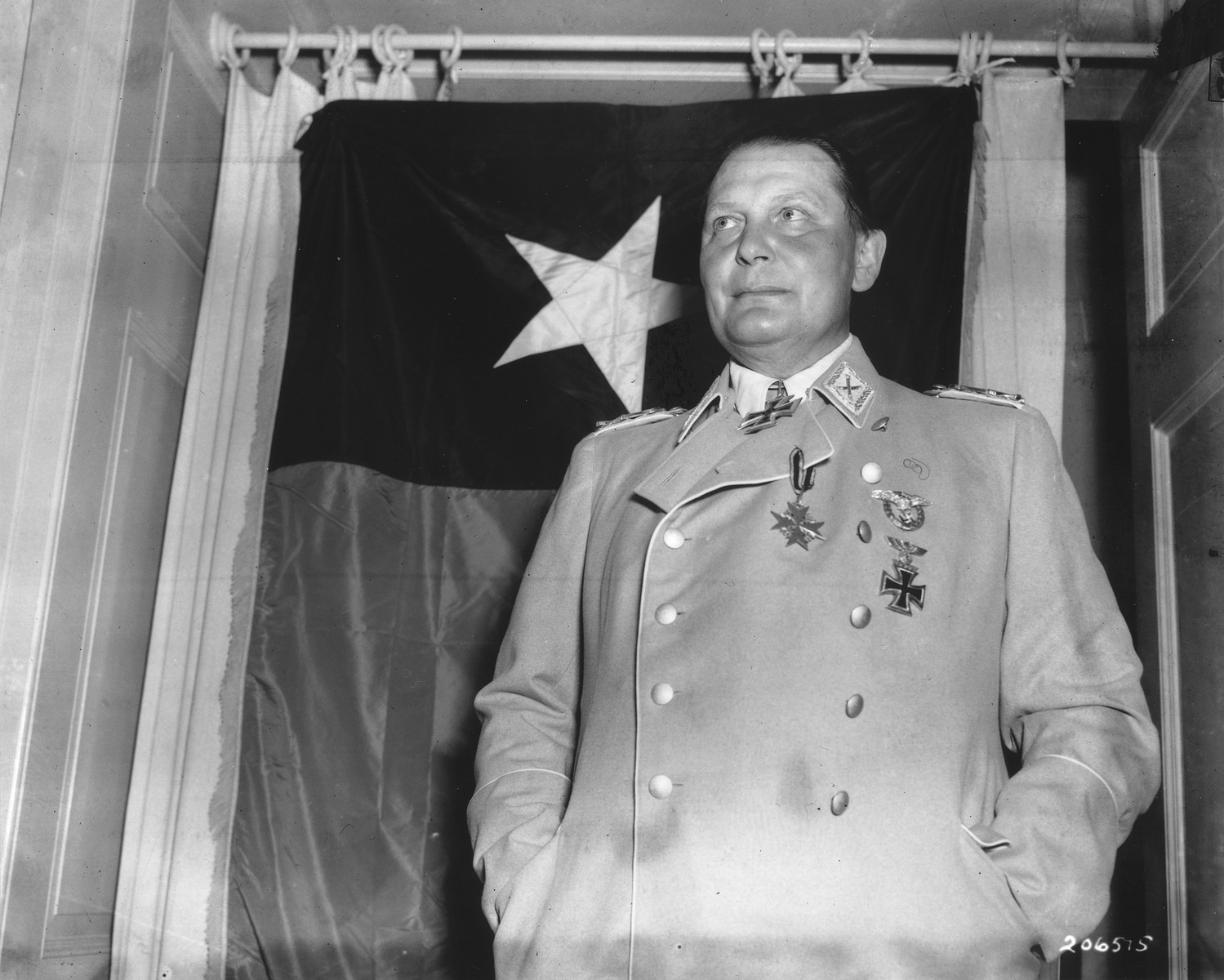
Göring in captivity 9 May 1945

The process was known as aryanization, and involved selling or auctioning property of Jews at well below market value to German citizens. In return Epenstein gave two castles, Veldenstein and Mauterndorf, to Göring. A year later Fromm and his family emigrated to London, where he died on 12 May 1945, four days after VE day. Fromm's estate, which was worth the equivalent of approximately 30 million Euros, had already been auctioned off on 17 May 1943 for 2,255 ℛ︁ℳ︁, though many items including a grand piano, plates, and his library had already been bought or stolen before.

Fromms' factory in Köpenick was almost completely destroyed by Allied Air raids, the remaining machinery was shipped to the Soviet Union, as it lay in the Soviet sector of Berlin. The Friedrichshagen factory continued to produce condoms, especially for the Red Army. The factories should have been returned to Fromm's family according to the Potsdam Agreement, however the company was nationalized by the Communist government.

In East Germany, Fromms condoms were produced by the Volkseigener Betrieb "Plastina", the brand was renamed to "Mondos".

In West Germany, Julius Fromm's son Herbert Fromm was forced to pay DM 174,000 to Otto Metz-Randa for the rights to the name Fromm. Metz-Randa, Elisabeth von Epenstein's lover, had acquired these rights after the death of Göring's godfather, and managed to transform himself from a profiteer of "Entjudung" (de-jewification) to a victim of the National Socialist regime. Herbert Fromm licensed a Bremen company to produce Fromms condoms, which are produced to the present day by Mapa GmbH, still under the brand name Fromms.
