= Sir Godber Evans =

Fictional character in the novel Porterhouse Blue

Ian Richardson as Sir Godber Evans in the TV adaptation of 'Porterhouse Blue'.

Sir Godber Evans is a central character in Porterhouse Blue (1974) and, posthumously, Grantchester Grind (1995), two novels about life in the fictitious Porterhouse College at Cambridge by British novelist Tom Sharpe. For centuries, Porterhouse College has been renowned for its cuisine, the prowess of its rowers and the low level of its academic achievements.

== Early career ==
From Brierley in South Yorkshire and the son of a butcher, Godber Evans went to the College from his grammar school, which immediately marked him out as 'not a gentleman'. Where the other 'scholars' at Porterhouse drink and dine and row, Evans studies, determined to make something of himself. This leads to his being 'dunked' in the College fountain. The left-wing Evans comes to hate Porterhouse and everything it represents and believes that after being an undergraduate there, a man has nothing left to fear.

Evans marries the wealthy and influential Lady Mary Lacey, daughter of a peer and heir to a fortune. She is regarded by all who encounter her as self-righteous, dogmatic and unattractive. With her money behind him Evans enters Parliament, being appointed Minister for Technological Development and later Social Security. He earned a knighthood and the nickname 'Soapy' after his campaign 'A Bathroom in every Home.' However, in this as in everything else he does, Evans is mediocre, and he knows it, deep within himself.

== As Master of Porterhouse ==
When the Master of Porterhouse dies without naming his successor, the College Visitor, the Queen, takes the Prime Minister's advice and appoints Sir Godber Evans as his successor. The Prime Minister sees it as an opportunity to get rid of him as his career has been marked by idealistic aspirations that generally failed to translate into effective policies. As Minister of Technological Development, he cut funding for research into superconductivity to the detriment of British industry. Sir Godber, having been pressured by his wealthy left-wing wife, Lady Mary, daughter of a Liberal Party peer, announces sweeping changes to the centuries of College tradition, much to the concern of Skullion, the Head Porter, and the Fellows, who plan a counter attack to the proposed contraceptive machines, women students, and a self-service canteen. Evans also intends to sell the row of houses where the College servants live.

Skullion contemptuously remembers Sir Godber from his student days as a grammar school boy and therefore not a proper gentleman. As the son of a butcher, young Godber was the recipient of the college's legendary snobbery, known to all as 'grammar school tyke.' Skullion is sacked for insolence by Sir Godber, and is forced to leave his home. He appears live on a television programme in which he reveals all of the College's murky secrets, to the horror of Sir Godber and the College's Senior Fellows, but to the amusement of everybody else.

Skullion returns to Cambridge, determined to ask for his job back in return for donating a large inheritance he has received to the College. He confronts Sir Godber who treats him with pity and contempt. This angers Skullion's sense of pride, and he advances menacingly on Sir Godber, who, backing away in fear, trips and bangs his head. He is found dying by the Dean and Senior Tutor and tries to tell them who is responsible. They misunderstand his meaning and believe that he has named Skullion as his successor as Master. They inform Skullion of this and he suffers a 'Porterhouse Blue' , a stroke, but survives and is installed as the new Master of the College.

== Grantchester Grind ==
The mysterious circumstances surrounding Sir Godber's death cause his widow, Lady Mary, to plant a spy in the College as the Sir Godber Evans Memorial Fellow. The appointee, Dr Purefoy Osbert, is to collect data proving that Sir Godber was murdered. He overhears a deliberately staged confession to the murder by Skullion, the current Master of Porterhouse.

== Sir Godber Evans in film ==
In 1987 Porterhouse Blue was adapted for television by Malcolm Bradbury for Channel 4, with Ian Richardson playing the role of Sir Godber Evans.

== See also ==
- Tom Sharpe
- Porterhouse Blue
- Grantchester Grind
- Porterhouse College, Cambridge
- Skullion
- Lord Jeremy Pimpole

== External sources ==
- Porterhouse Blue. ISBN 0-87113-279-6.
- Grantchester Grind. ISBN 0-436-20289-1.
