= Caretaker Gazette =

The Caretaker Gazette is a bi-monthly newsletter connecting property owners wanting property caretakers and house sitters for their property with potential applicants. Subscribers are normally potential applicants and pay for their subscription. In addition to the ads, it carries profiles of some caretakers. It is a print publication and an online version of the newsletter is also available. It is the only publication in the world that covers the property caretaking field. In recent years, positions outside the United States have been an increasing share of the advertised opportunities.

== History and profile ==
The Caretaker Gazette was launched in 1983 with 200 subscribers. In 1993, when the newsletter had 500 subscribers, it came close to folding when the original publisher retired. The subscriber list and rights to the name were purchased by the current publisher, Gary C. Dunn, who has expanded the readership to 10,000 subscribers, the majority of whom are over age 50.

The headquarters of The Caretaker Gazette is in Austin, Texas.
