= Property caretaker =

Person, group, or organization that cares for real estate for compensation

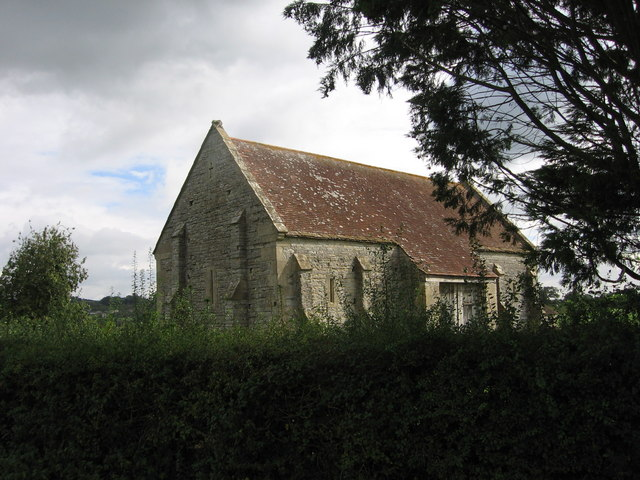
Court Barn near West Pennard, Somerset. This barn is in the care of the National Trust for Places of Historic Interest or Natural Beauty in the United Kingdom.

A property caretaker is a person, group, or organization that cares for real estate for trade or financial compensation, and sometimes as a barter for rent-free living accommodations.

== Duties and functions ==
The caretaking profession includes positions as housesitters, ranch sitters, bed & breakfast and innsitters, property managers, estate managers, and hosts at resorts or campgrounds.

Caretakers are sometimes used by property owners who are unwilling or unable to hire a professional management company. Many homeowners who rent their properties may hire caretakers instead of property managers in order to save money. Caretakers are not licensed by any state or local authority and are often relatively cheaper than their professional counterparts.

In the UK, a number of buildings have a live-in caretaker whose part-time responsibilities might include letting tradesmen in, taking in parcels and signing for letters, holding keys, vacuuming the common areas, washing the communal steps and windows, etc. The caretaker will often live in a flat rent free.

== History ==
Caretaking is historical, rooted in the British tradition of land maintenance. In 1868, The Times defined a caretaker as "a person put in charge of a farm from which the tenant has been evicted." Today that definition has been expanded to cover a multitude of landowner/caretaker relationships. The number and diversity of these relationships has increased during the past decade. The property caretaking field has been covered by The Caretaker Gazette since 1983.

== See also ==
- Concierge
- Porter
- Doorman (profession)
