= Viv Fisher =

Viv Fisher (born 1952) is a British former BBC audio engineer and multivocalist who performed all parts of the brass band used in the title sequence of the BBC television series Blott on the Landscape (1985). In 1978, Fisher appeared on the BBC children's programme Blue Peter.

== See also ==
- Beatboxing
