= Riotous Assembly =

1971 novel by Tom Sharpe

- First edition
- Author: Tom Sharpe
- Language: English
- Genre: Humor
- Publisher: Secker & Warburg
- Publication date: 1971
- Publication place: United Kingdom
- Pages: 204
- ISBN: 0-330-23423-4
- Preceded by: -
- Followed by: Indecent Exposure

Riotous Assembly is the debut novel of British comic writer Tom Sharpe, written and originally published in 1971. Set in the fictitious South African town of Piemburg, Riotous Assembly lampoons South African apartheid, and the police who enforced it.

== Plot summary ==
Kommandant van Heerden, who has risen to Chief of Police of Piemburg through nepotism rather than merit, is called out to deal with a strange murder case involving the eccentric English spinster, Miss Hazelstone. It appears that Miss Hazelstone has obliterated her black cook 'Fivepence' with a quadruple-barreled elephant gun. A paradoxical anglophile, van Heerden is initially willing to brush the incident under the carpet, until Miss Hazelstone reveals that she and the cook were former lovers (an offence under the Immorality Act) sharing a penchant for transvestism and rubber fetishism.

In his panic to stop the truth getting out, van Heerden places Miss Hazelstone under house arrest, calling in all available reinforcements to quarantine the area, and places his assistant, the bloodthirsty Konstabel Els, on guard, carrying the same elephant gun. The chaos that follows turns a potentially sensitive political scandal into a full-blown catastrophe, one that van Heerden, his deputy Lieutenant Verkramp and Els must resolve to uphold the 'honour' of Piemburg and apartheid.
