= Blott on the Landscape =

1975 novel by Tom Sharpe

- First edition (publ. Secker & Warburg)
- Author: Tom Sharpe
- Publication date: 1975

Blott on the Landscape is a novel by the English writer Tom Sharpe which was first published in 1975. The book was adapted into a 6-part television series of the same name for BBC Television in 1985.

== Plot ==
The story revolves around the proposed construction of a motorway—M101 in the book and the M399 in the BBC series—through Cleene Gorge in rural South Worfordshire—a fictional gorge in a fictional English county.

At one end of Cleene Gorge is Handyman Hall, the home of the politician Sir Giles Lynchwood and his wife Lady Maud Lynchwood.

Sir Giles is secretly in favour of ensuring that the motorway passes through the Cleene Gorge (and is actually the originator of the plan) as it will mean he will be paid the compensation for the destruction of Handyman Hall, which is under a covenant preventing its sale. While superficially pretending to be supportive he takes steps to undermine the inquiry and prevent alternatives being adopted, to ensure the new road travels through the Gorge. By contrast, Lady Maud's family has lived in the gorge for over 500 years, and she is fiercely defensive of her heritage and expects Giles to support her.

Matters are further complicated by their on-going marital problems, including Sir Giles's fetishist infidelity and Lady Maud's wish for children to continue her line (to which Sir Giles is violently opposed); and the actions of Maud's gardener, Blott, a former German prisoner of war who is believed to be Italian. The German Army had become so fed up with Blott that the Nazi High Command decided to get rid of him by assigning him to an Italian bomber on a raid to England. Blott, who had served as navigator—and was not very good at it—made them completely lost and was the only survivor when his plane crashed into a mountain, whereupon he was captured, with his captors believing him to be Italian. Blott is strongly patriotic towards his new home nation and home and fiercely devoted to the Handyman family, Maud in particular. Maud's and Giles's marriage settlement leaves Giles with Handyman Hall in the event of a no-fault divorce but not in the event of death or infidelity, a situation he also seeks to provoke by refusing to co-operate in his marital duties and which Maud sees as a potential solution.

With his military training, and some leftovers of the war secretly buried on the estate, Blott begins a covert campaign including blackmail and wire tapping to scrutinize Sir Giles's activities on Maud's behalf and to undermine the construction of the motorway. He also discovers and aims to foil Giles's plans. In the course of the fight for the Gorge, a picturesque nearby village is destroyed by Blott using a demolition crane to whip up popular opposition to the works. Giles is discovered by Lady Maud and Blott in bed bound by his mistress Mrs Forthby and is blackmailed, as is Dundridge, the official in charge of the motorway construction, and the Hall is quickly converted into a wildlife park in an attempt to prevent the removal of its occupants. Giles himself is finally killed by lions when he is discovered by Blott and Maud trying to burn down the Hall.

As a final resort, Blott concretes himself into his home, located in the entrance archway to the estate, preventing work progressing. Dundridge, frustrated and going rapidly mad with power, demands the SAS are called in to remove Blott. Blott, after repelling their attempts to scale the arch, secretly launches an attack on his own archway for which the SAS is blamed, finally compelling enough public attention to cause the plans to be dropped. Dundridge is imprisoned for his part in the 'attack' and the destruction of the village (in which one person had been accidentally killed), and Maud and Blott (who have fallen in love by this time) marry and state their intention to add to the Handyman family.

== Adaptations ==
=== Audio book ===
- Blott on the Landscape was released as an audiobook in two formats: abridged by Listen for Pleasure read by George Cole (ISBN 1858481538), and unabridged by Chivers Audio Books read by David Suchet (ISBN 0745142036).
