= Porters' lodge =

Place in a building where porters can be found

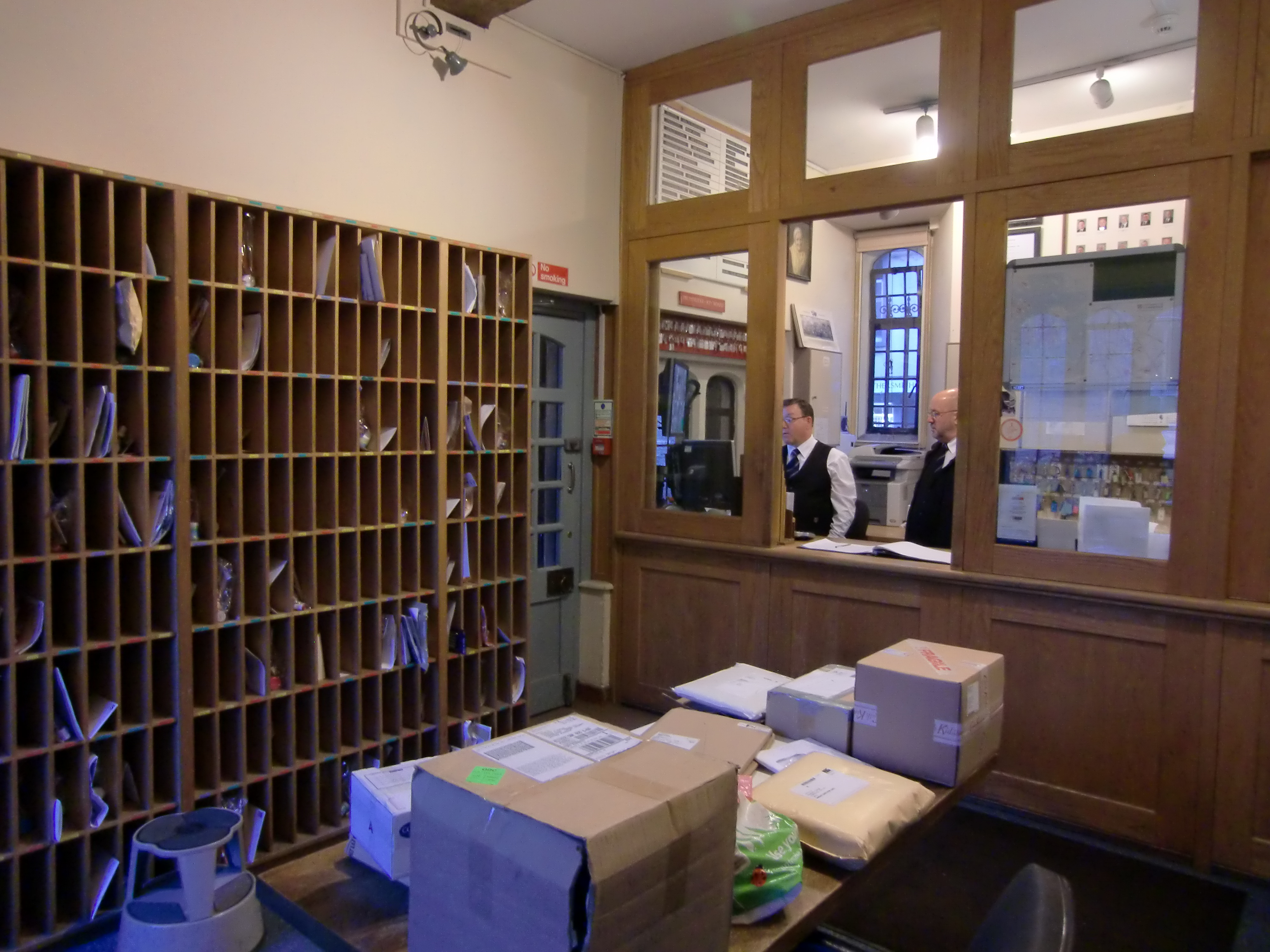
Porters' lodge in Magdalene College, Cambridge

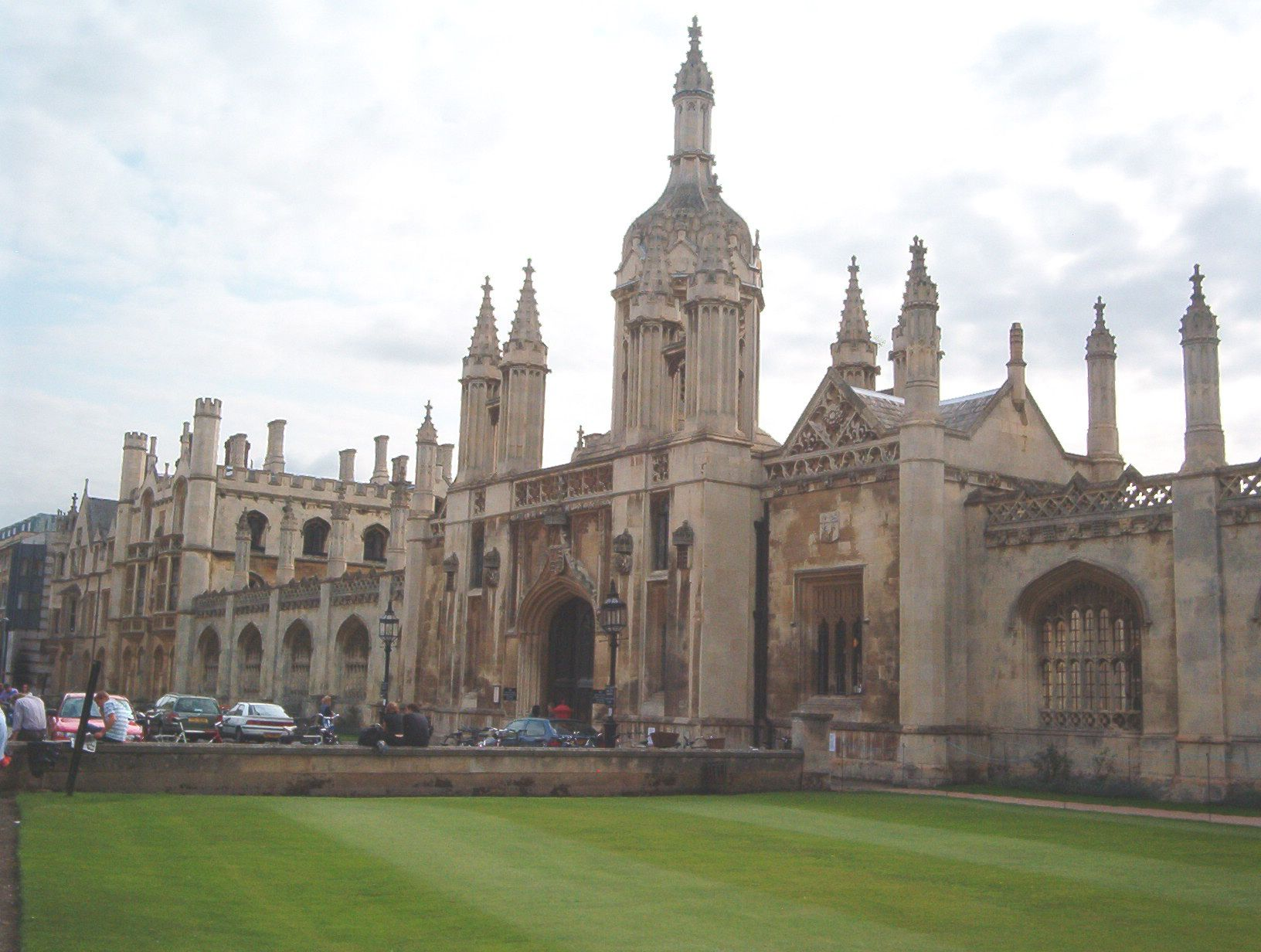
The Gatehouse containing the porters' lodge at King's College, Cambridge

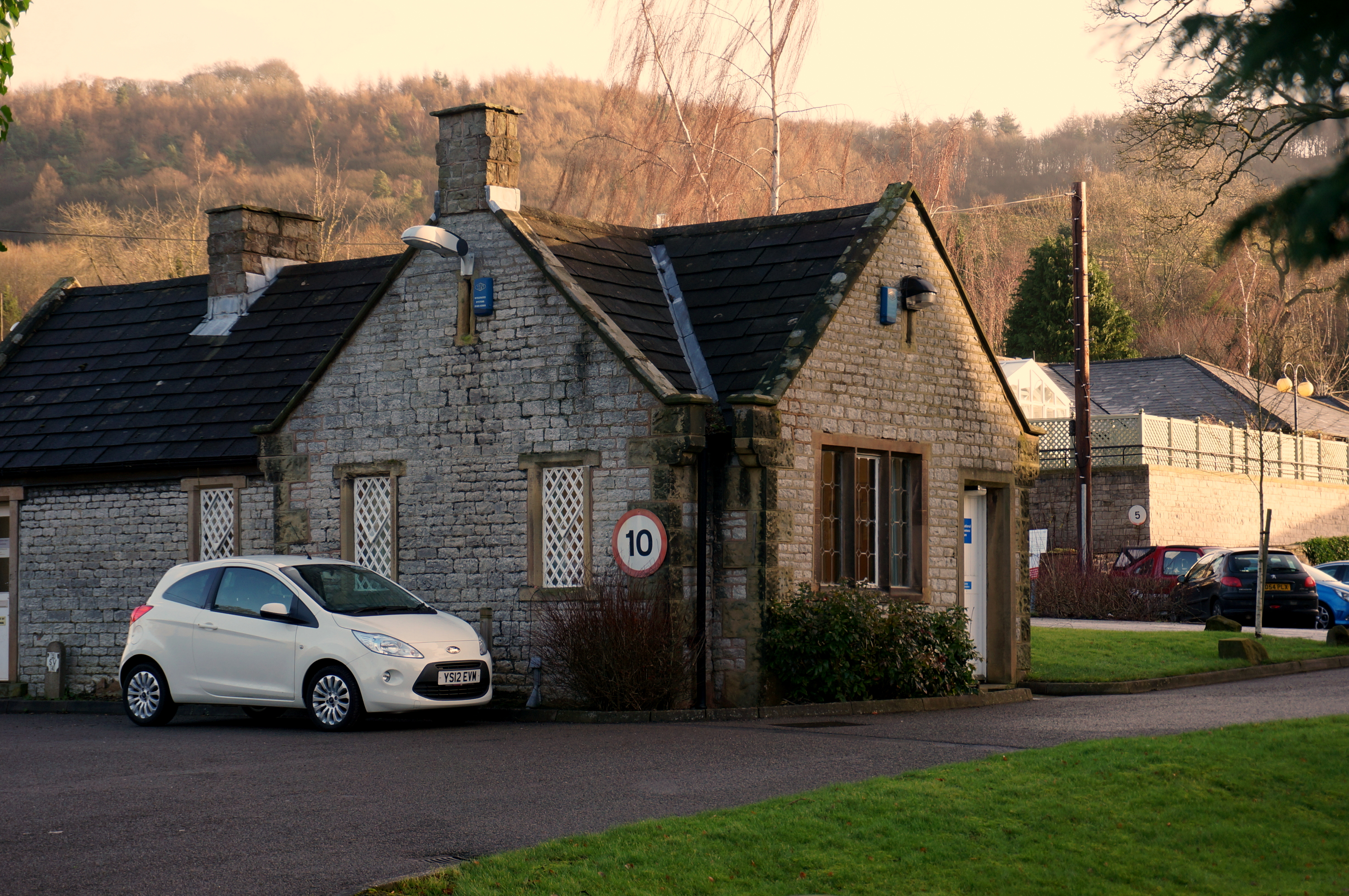
The historic porter's lodge at Newholme Hospital in Derbyshire

A porters' lodge or porter's lodge (colloquially, plodge) is a place near the entrance of a building where one or more porters can be found to respond to student enquiries as well as enquires from the public and direct them around the building. It is particularly associated with university accommodation in the United Kingdom and Canada (such as the majority of colleges of the Universities of Cambridge, Oxford, Durham, York and Toronto).

Oxbridge porters' lodges typically also house the pigeon-holes for students' and Fellows' mail.

Historically, some hospitals included a porter’s lodge, as with Newholme Hospital in Derbyshire, built for the Hospital porter for purposes of reception, messaging, mail, and myriad other duties.
