= Porter (college) =

Occupation within certain UK universities

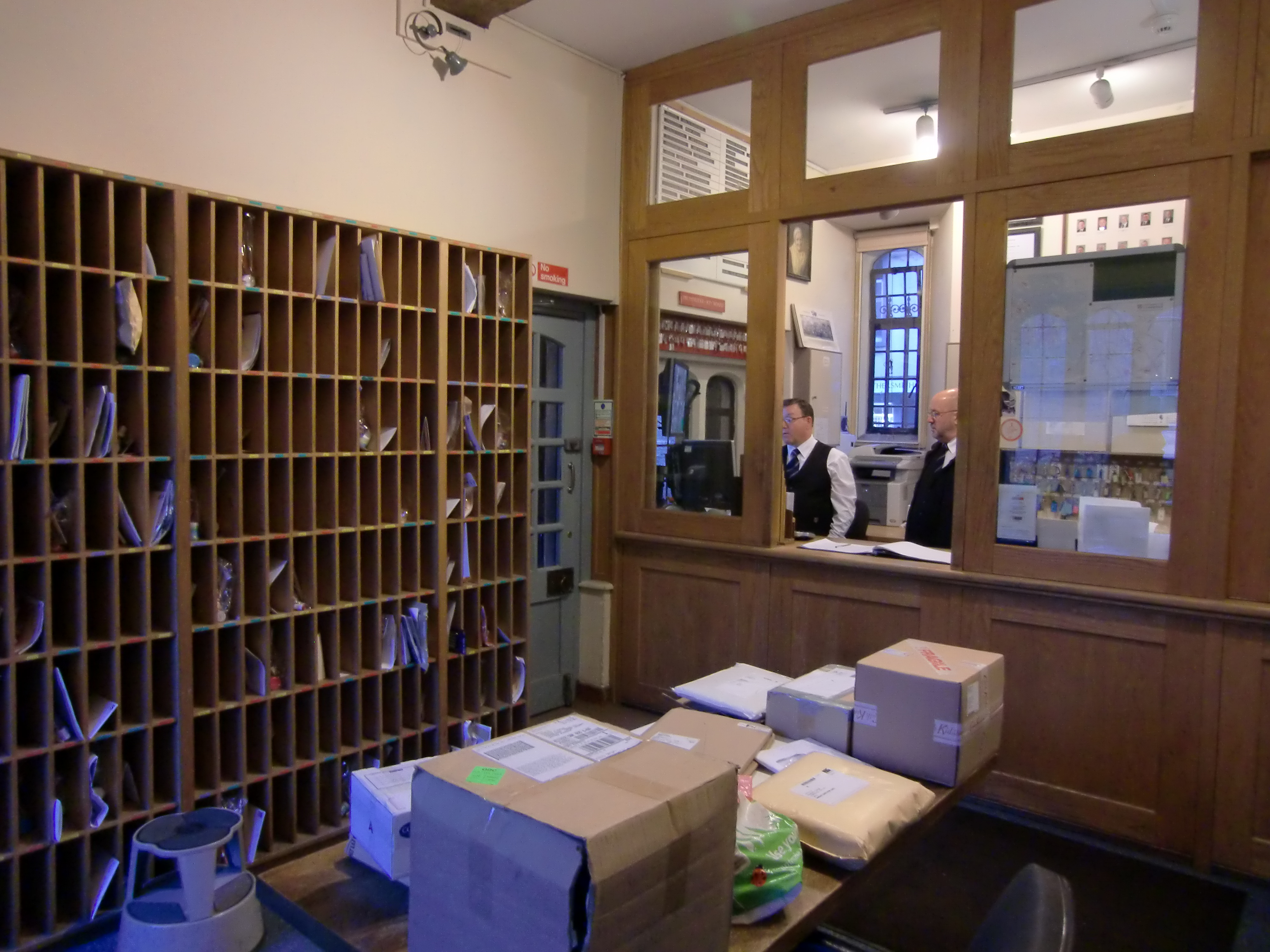
Porter's lodge in Magdalene College, Cambridge, 2010

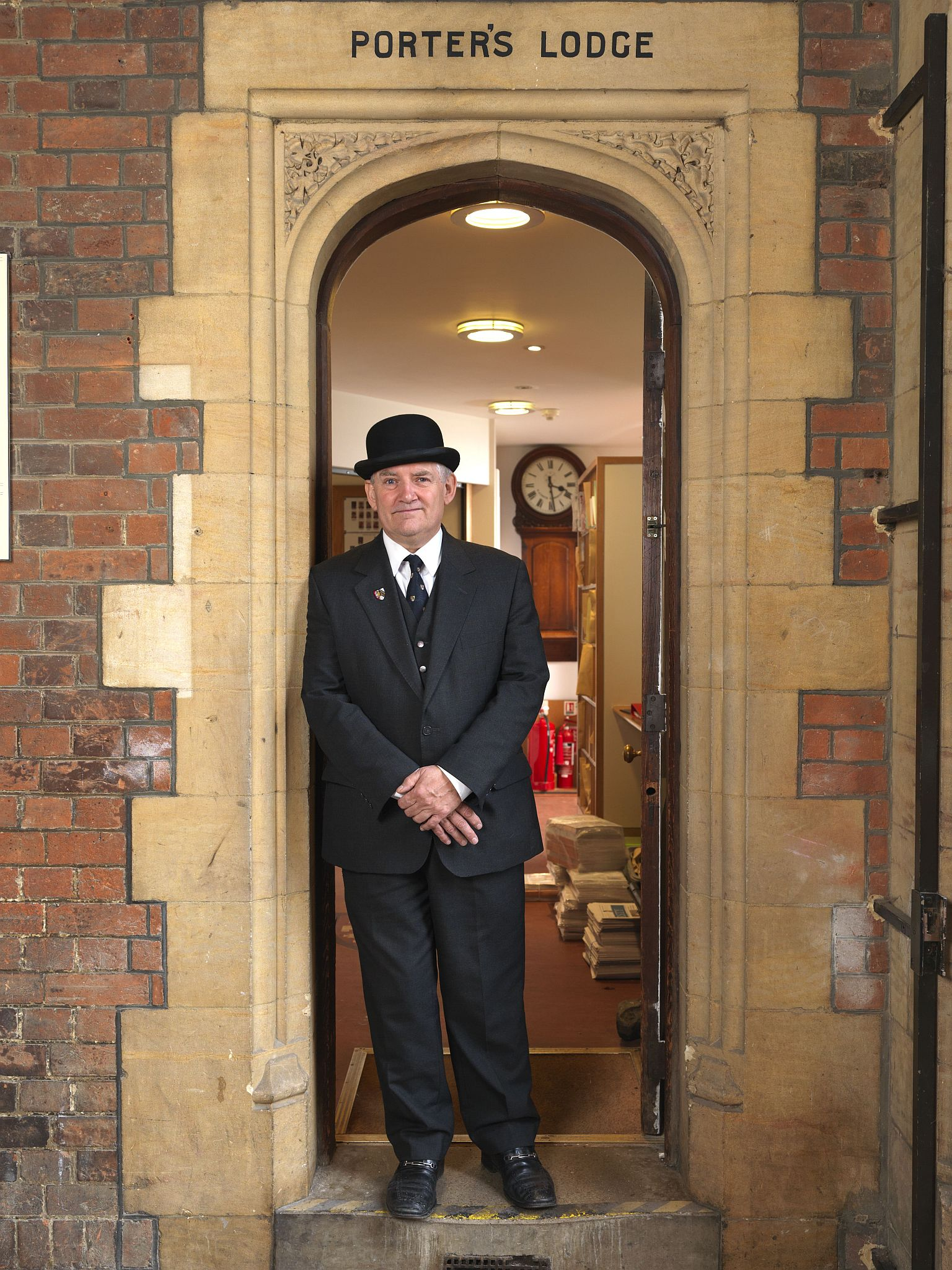
The Porters' lodge at Selwyn College, Cambridge

The University of Edinburgh, the majority of colleges at the universities of Cambridge, Durham and Oxford, as well as newer collegiate universities such as Lancaster University, the University of York, and older universities like University of Bristol and St David's College, have members of staff called porters. There is normally a Head Porter, Deputy Head Porter and a team of other porters. Their precise job roles vary from college to college. Jobs as Oxbridge porters are highly sought after. Porters work in a section of the college called the porters' lodge, at the main entrance.

Roles can involve:

- Controlling entry to the college
- Sorting mail
- Providing security to members
- Reporting students to the Dean
- Maintenance and repairs to college property

Porters also exist at McGill University in Canada, where each one is generally responsible for a large building or group of smaller buildings. Generally, they provide a single point of contact for any issues relating to the facilities they are responsible for, including security, maintenance requests, access control, etc.

The character Skullion from Tom Sharpe's satirical 1974 novel Porterhouse Blue was a fictional head porter reputed to be based on Albert Jaggard, the Head Porter of Corpus Christi during the 1960s and 1970s.

At Edinburgh, the position has historically been hereditary.
