= Purl =

Alcoholic beverage

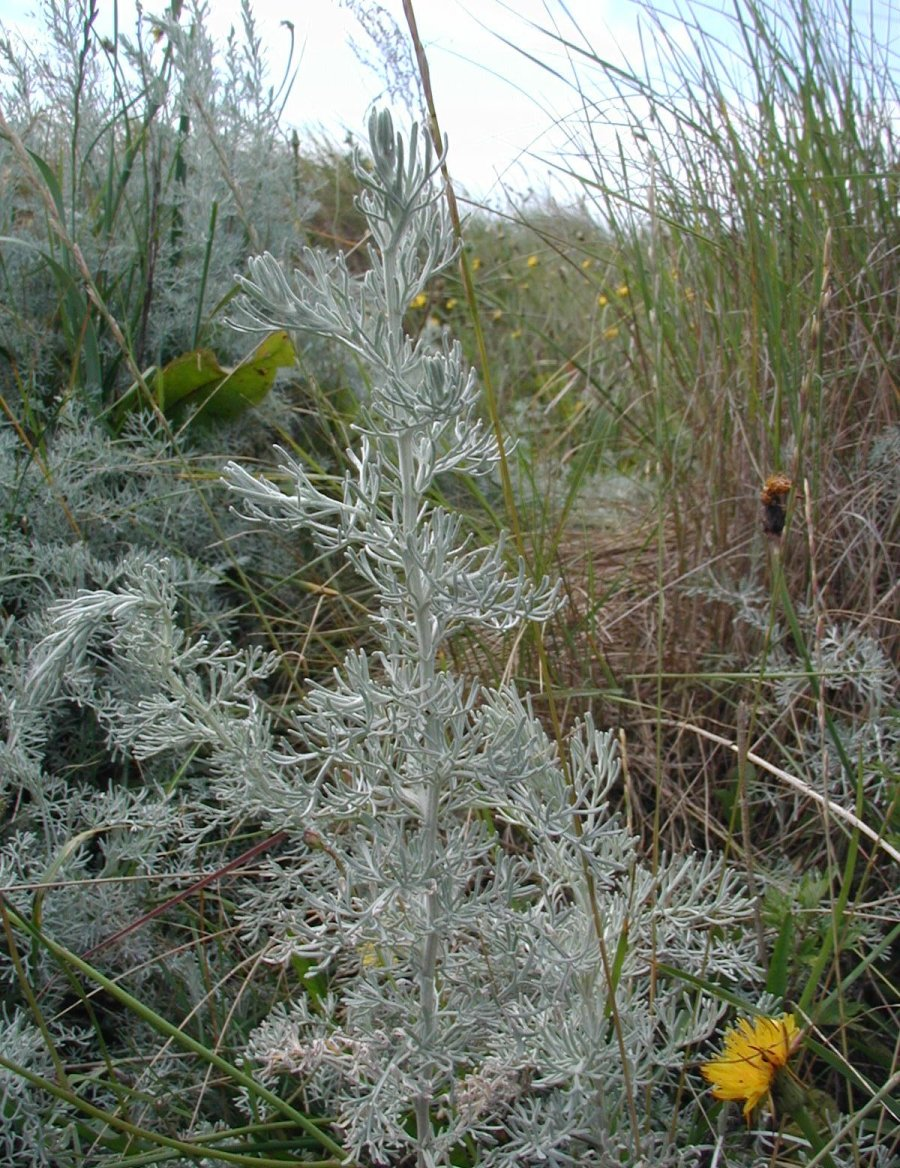
Artemisia maritima, the aromatic (and anthelmintic) herb most frequently used to flavour purl: English common names include sea wormwood and old woman

Purl or wormwood ale is an English drink. It was originally made by infusing ale with the tops of various species of Artemisia ("wormwood"), especially those of Artemisia maritima, "sea wormwood", which grows in coastal salt marsh and bears the alternative English common name of "old woman" ("old man" being a common name of the related A. abrotanum). Other purgative or bitter herbs such as orange peel or senna might also be used. The drink was commonly drunk in the early hours of the morning at which time it was popular with labourers.

By the middle of the 19th century, wormwood had been forgotten and the recipe was to mull ale instead with gin, sugar and spices such as ginger. It was sold by purl-men from purl-boats on the Thames who were licensed by the Watermen's Hall. The drink had ceased to be popular by the end of the 19th century, being replaced by beer, especially the variety known to the English as bitter.

Purl-royal was a similar concoction made using wine in place of ale or beer.

The English took the drink with them to North America and a purl house was opened in New York, where rich punches and possets were popular.

Purl was traditionally drunk during the winter and spring seasons.

== In fiction ==
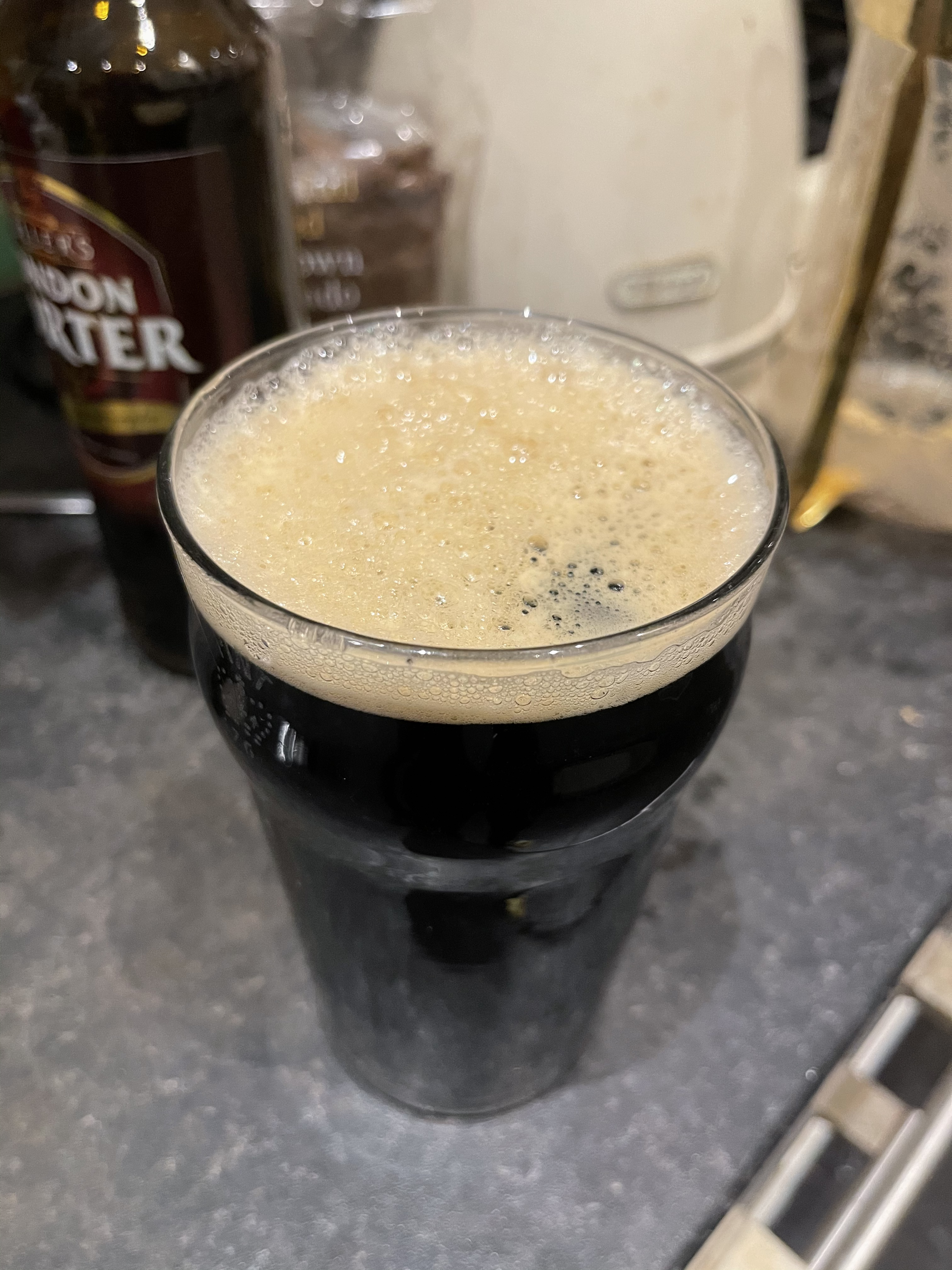
A freshly-mulled pint of Dog's Nose (so called because wet and black), one of the mid-19th century descendants of the original (wormwood) purl, containing London porter, gin, brown sugar and sometimes also nutmeg

Shakespeare mentions purl in his play, The Merry Wives of Windsor. Samuel Pepys recorded in his diary entry for February 19, 1660, "Thence forth to Mr Harper's to drink a draft of purle, whither by appointment Monsieur L'Impertinent". On March 21, 1662, he writes, "Thence to Westminster Hall ... Here I met with Chetwind, Parry, and several others, and went to a little house behind the Lords' house to drink some wormwood ale, which doubtless was a bawdy house, the mistress of the house having the look and dress".

Two centuries later, purl appeared in Charles Dickens's The Old Curiosity Shop, published in 1840–1841. The character Dick Swiveller makes a show of kindness by bringing from a public house a boy "who bore in one hand a plate of bread and beef, and in the other a great pot, filled with some very fragrant compound, which sent forth a grateful steam, and was indeed choice purl, made after a particular recipe which Mr Swiveller had imparted to the landlord, at a period when he was deep in his books and desirous to conciliate his friendship." And, in the next chapter: "Mr. Swiveller emerged from the house; and feeling that he had by this time taken quite as much to drink as promised to be good for his constitution (purl being a rather strong and heady compound)...."

Dickens described the final period of the drink in his last complete novel, Our Mutual Friend:

For the rest, both the tap and parlour of the Six Jolly Fellowship-Porters gave upon the river, and had red curtains matching the noses of the regular customers, and were provided with comfortable fireside tin utensils, like models of sugar-loaf hats, made in that shape that they might, with their pointed ends, seek out for themselves glowing nooks in the depths of the red coals, when they mulled your ale, or heated for you those delectable drinks, Purl, Flip, and Dog's Nose. The first of these humming compounds was a speciality of the Porters, which, through an inscription on its door-posts, gently appealed to your feelings as, "The Early Purl House". For, it would seem that Purl must always be taken early; though whether for any more distinctly stomachic reason than that, as the early bird catches the worm, so the early purl catches the customer, cannot here be resolved.

"Early" purl is depicted as being served in an English coach house in the 1830s in Tom Brown's School Days by Thomas Hughes.

== Recipe ==
According to The London and Country Brewer, purl was made in the following manner:

Roman Wormwood two Dozen; Gentian-root six Pounds; Calamus Aromaticus (or the sweet Flag-root) two Pounds; Snake-root one Pound; Horse-Rhadish one Bunch; Orange-peel dried, and Juniper-berries, each, two Pounds; Seeds or Kernels of Sevil-Oranges clean'd and dry'd, two Pounds. These he cuts and bruises and puts them into a clean Butt, and starts his mild brown, or pale Beer upon them so as to fill up the vessel, about the beginning of November, which he lets stand till next Season. This he does annually, and ought to be followed by all the Business. N. B. Was he to add a Pound or two of Galingal-Roots, to it, the Composition would be the better.

Another way of making purl is described in Accum's Treatise on the Art of Brewing (1820): "Amber Ale, which is also called Two-penny, because it was sold for two-pence a pint, when porter was retailed at three-pence the quart, was formerly employed for making the liquor called Purl, or warmed two-penny beer, mixed with a small quantity of a bitter tincture: usually with tincture of bitter orange peels".

== See also ==
- Absinthe
- Vermouth
