= Porterhouse Blue =

1974 novel by Tom Sharpe

- First edition
- Author: Tom Sharpe
- Language: English
- Publisher: Secker & Warburg
- Publication date: 1974
- Publication place: United Kingdom
- ISBN: 0-330-24667-4
- Followed by: Grantchester Grind

Porterhouse Blue is a novel written by Tom Sharpe, first published in 1974. A satirical look at Cambridge life and the struggle between tradition and reform, Porterhouse Blue tells the story of Skullion, the Head Porter of Porterhouse, a fictional college of Cambridge University.

The novel has a sequel, Grantchester Grind. In 1987, Channel 4 adapted Porterhouse Blue into a TV series of the same name.

== Characters ==
The central characters are Skullion, the Head Porter; Zipser, a research graduate student; Sir Godber Evans, the Master; Lady Mary, the Master's wife; the Dean; and Mrs. Biggs, Zipser's bedder.

== Plot ==
Cover of Porterhouse Blue paperback by Pan

For the first time in five hundred years, the master of Porterhouse fails to name his successor on his deathbed before dying. He succumbs to a Porterhouse Blue - a stroke brought about by overindulgence in the college's legendary cuisine. Sir Godber Evans is appointed as his successor. Sir Godber, egged on by his zealous wife, Lady Mary, announces sweeping changes to the centuries of college tradition, much to the concern of Skullion and the Fellows, who plan a counter-attack on the proposed contraceptive machines, women students, and canteen.

Meanwhile, the only research graduate student in the college, Zipser, visits the hard-of-hearing Chaplain and explains his fixation for Mrs Biggs, his middle-aged, large-breasted bedder. As the Chaplain is hard of hearing he requires Zipser to use a megaphone. To his intense embarrassment Zipser is overheard by members of the college who gather outside to listen. Mrs Biggs is not within earshot, but nevertheless has sensed that something is up from Zipser's awkward behaviour around her every time she comes to clean his rooms and especially when she teases him sexually, such as when she asks him to help take off her bright red PVC raincoat in the tight confines of the "gyp".

While Sir Godber congratulates himself on having defeated the traditionalists, investigative journalist Cornelius Carrington is brought in on the pretext of helping both parties, while secretly having his own agenda.

Meanwhile, having been advised to pick up a foreign student, so as to avoid his lust for Mrs Biggs, after a series of frustrating attempts to buy condoms Zipser drunkenly acquires two large boxes. Concerned that he has technically stolen them, he tries many ways to get rid of them and eventually inflates them with gas from the gas fire in his rooms and floats them up the chimney, without realising that some have become stuck in the chimney while the rest have floated down into the college court. Fearing for the good name of college, Skullion spends the night bursting the inflated condoms.

Mrs Biggs has decided to reciprocate Zipser's passion, and sneaks up to Zipser's room in the middle of the night and wakes him up. To his amazement she undresses and, despite his protests, promptly enters his bed and lies on top of him. Unfortunately, while undressing, she has lit the gas fire, which takes a short while to ignite the inflated condoms stuck in the chimney, causing an explosion that demolishes the Bull Tower and kills her and Zipser in their moment of passion.

Skullion refuses to open the main gates of college to let the fire engines in and continues to burst the inflated condoms; partly as a consequence he is fired. However, when he visits his bank he discovers his nest egg of shares inherited from a previous master is worth a fortune. He takes his revenge by giving a shocking revelatory interview on Carrington's live television show. Skullion pleads with Sir Godber to be reinstated, but is refused so, in anger, he pushes Sir Godber, causing him to fall and sustain a mortal injury. Skullion quickly leaves before two senior academics find the dying Sir Godber who whispers them one word: 'Skullion'. They agree that, in accordance with college tradition, Skullion has been named the new Master of Porterhouse.

When Skullion is visited by the college officials with the good news, he thinks they have found out his involvement with Sir Godber's death and whilst they are telling him about his great promotion it causes in him a debilitating Porterhouse Blue, and he suffers paralysis. Nonetheless, he is installed as the Master and his shares are sold for rebuilding the Bull Tower, so Porterhouse's traditions are firmly re-established.

== Adaptations ==
=== Audio books ===
There have also been two audio book versions;

- Porterhouse Blue. read by David Jason. HarperCollins. 1992. ISBN 0-00-104635-7.
- Porterhouse Blue: Complete & Unabridged (Word for Word Audio Books). read by Griff Rhys Jones. BBC Audio and Chivers. 1993. ISBN 0-7451-2817-3.

== See also ==
- Tom Sharpe
- Grantchester Grind
- List of fictional Cambridge colleges
