= Bedder =

Occupation at the University of Cambridge

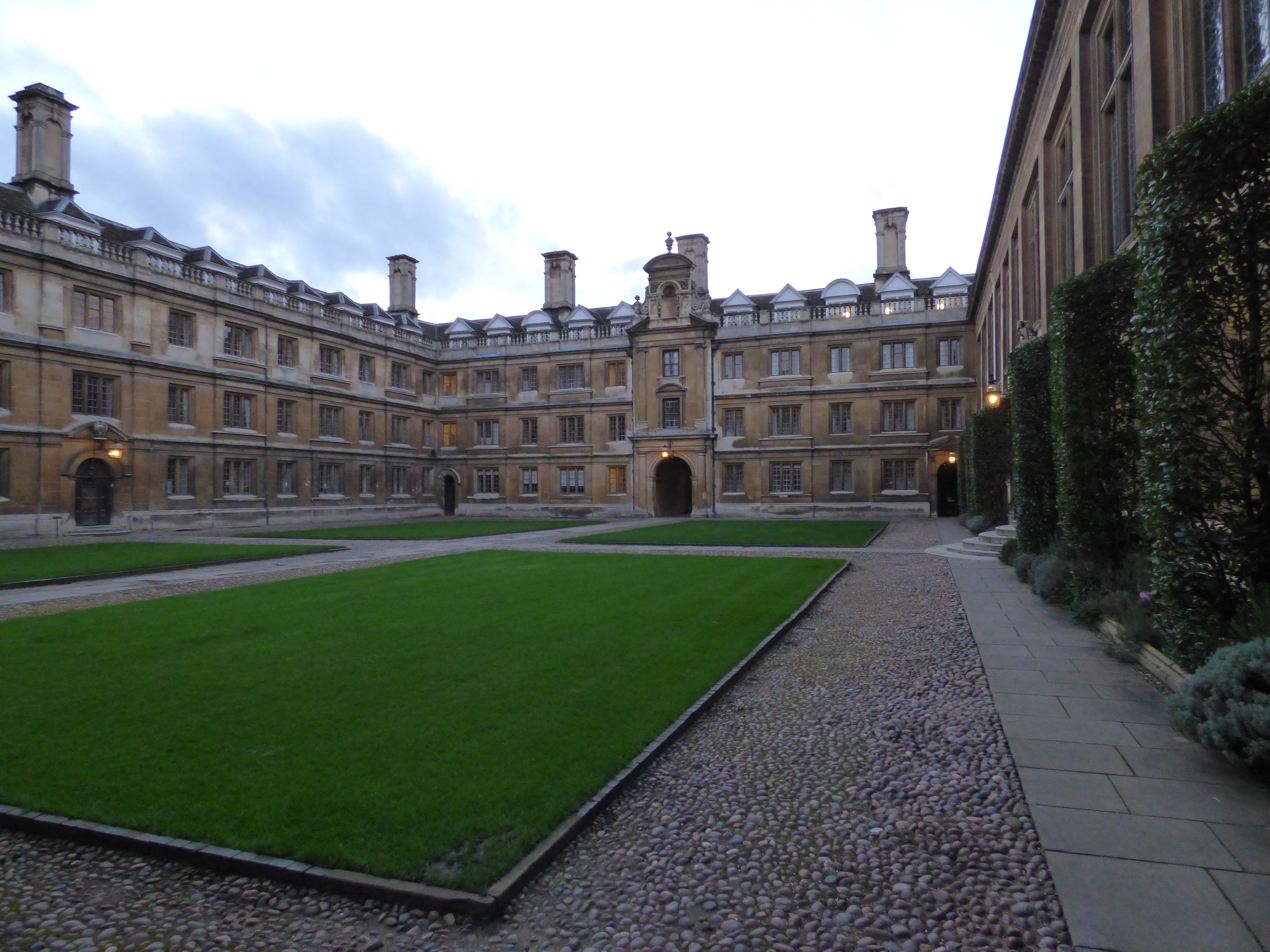
University of Cambridge (Clare College)

A "bedder", short for "bedmaker", is a housekeeper in a college of the University of Cambridge. The equivalent at the University of Oxford is known as a "scout". The equivalent at Trinity College, Dublin was known as a "skip", until the practice was abandoned in the early 1970s. The colleges of the University of Durham have also replicated the Oxbridge model and refer to housekeeping staff as bedders. There is no equivalent at the vast majority of other British or American universities, though the universities of Harvard, Yale, and Princeton have previously offered similar positions to care for their students' needs.

== History ==
In early times, bedders were often employed directly by students and fellows rather than the college, but they are now part-time college employees. An edict of the University of Cambridge issued in 1635 banned bedders aged under fifty, although this policy has long since been abandoned. Until the late Victorian age, women could not become undergraduates, and there were even regulations preventing Fellows from marrying, so the edict may have been intended to leave bedders beyond suspicion of any impropriety. Rumours persist that there was once a broader "Bedder Test", but there is no evidence that colleges ever preferred women of unappealing mien.

Historically, a gyp (undergraduate's manservant) supplemented the role of the bedder at Cambridge, Durham, and other institutes of education.

== Development ==
Even in the early 20th century, before modern utilities were installed in the colleges, the role required heavier labour, cleaning coal fires and carrying water for washing. Nowadays, bedders often change bed linen, vacuum the rooms, empty bins and perform other domestic services, although their role varies from college to college. Some do not make beds at all, but others go so far as to wash students' dishes.

== Conditions ==
The job earns more than the minimum wage, but it is sometimes hard to fill vacancies as the role appears demeaning to modern British women, and staff from other countries are also recruited. The role requires a high degree of trust. Some bedders see their role as including a pastoral element, looking out for the needs of young people far from home.

Perks of the job include discount cards (at Cambridge), Christmas presents from students, and occasional more generous gifts from delegates staying in the rooms for corporate conferences in between University terms.
