= Condom machine =

Vending machine for the sale of condoms

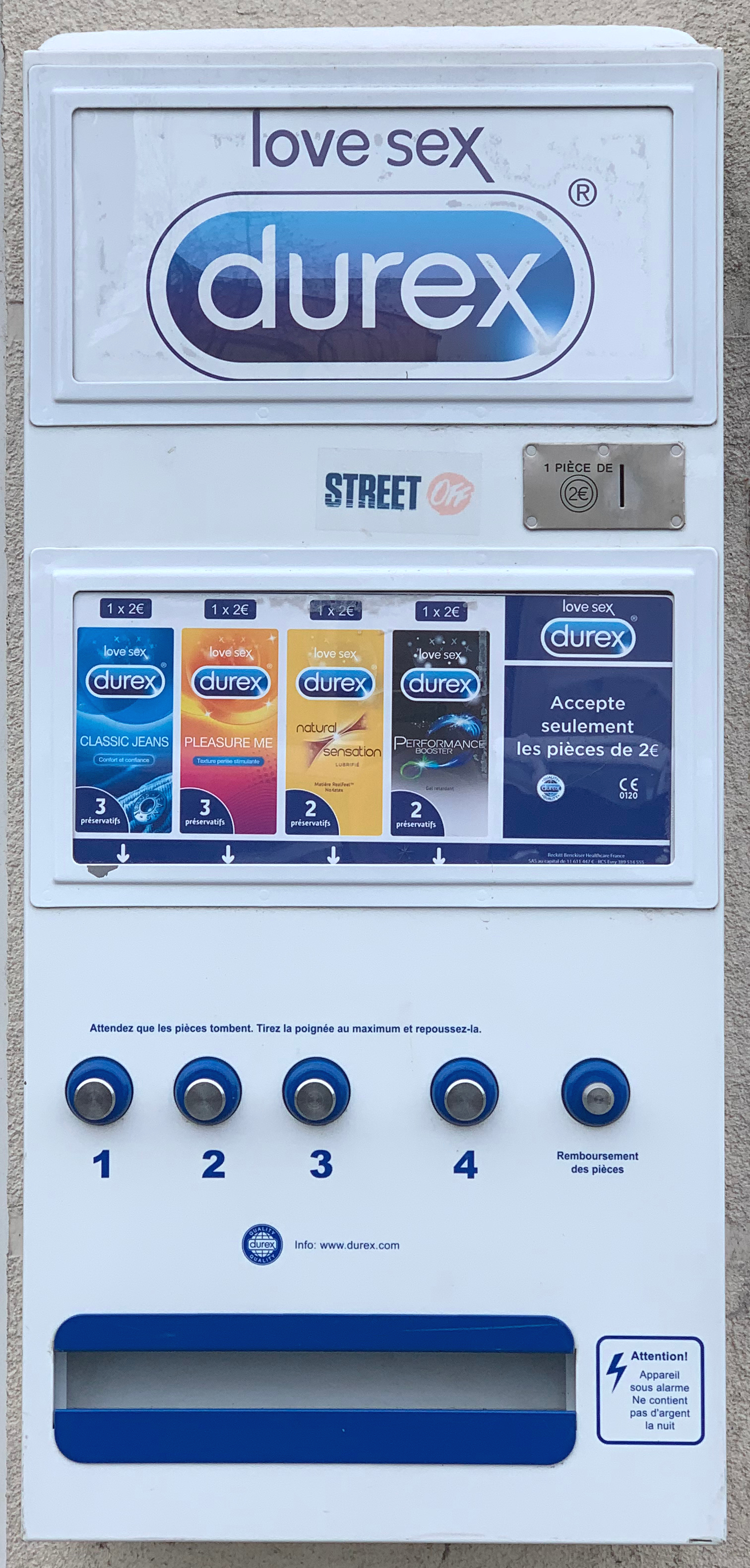
Condom vending machine in France

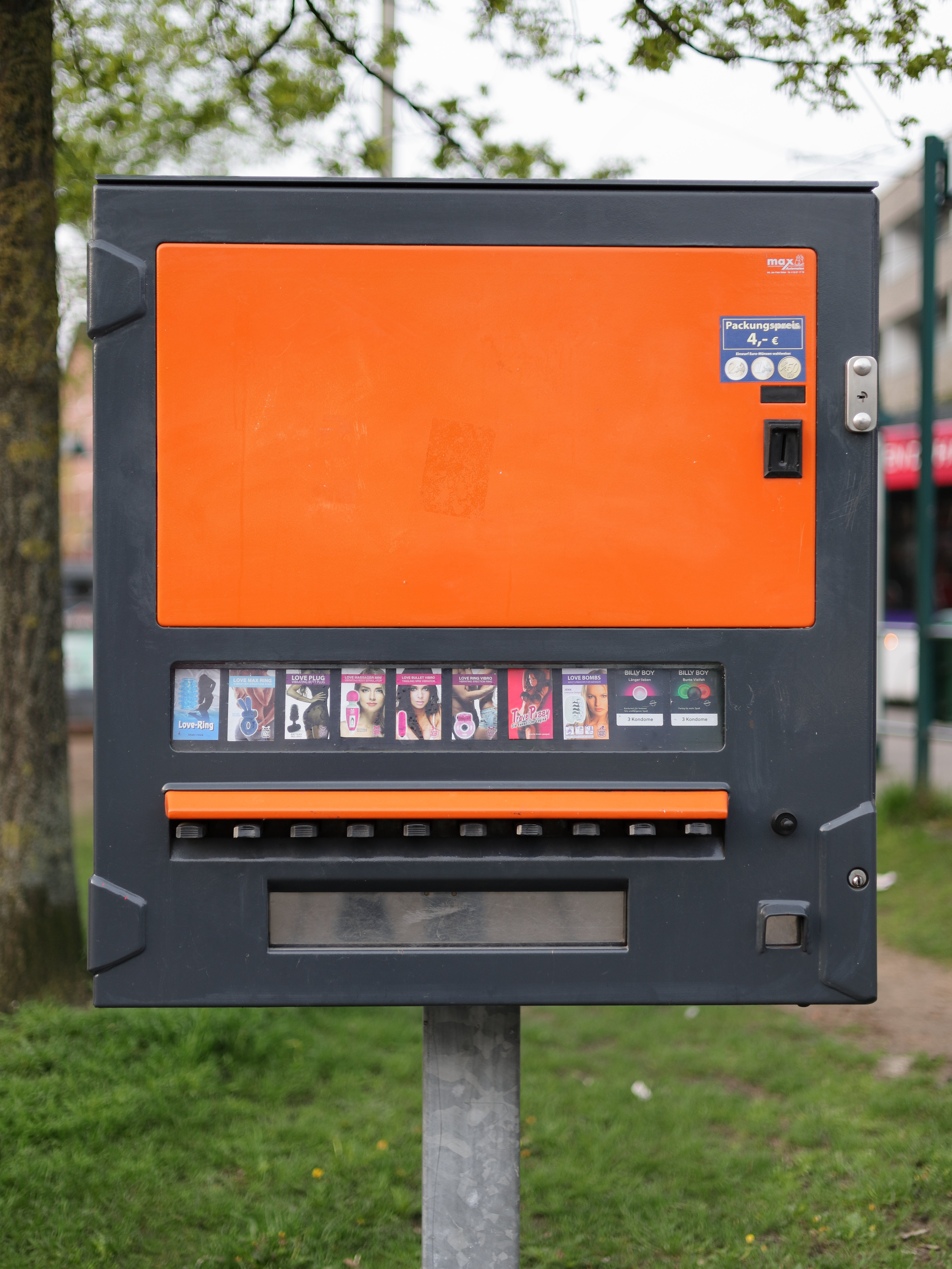
A vending machine for various sex toys, including condoms, in Germany

A condom machine is a vending machine for the sale of condoms. Condom machines are often placed in public toilets, subway stations, railway stations and airports as a public health measure to promote safe sex. Many pharmacies also keep one outside, for after-hours access. Rare examples exist that dispense internal condoms.

== History ==
Condom vending machines were introduced in 1928 by Julius Fromm's company.

== Popular culture ==
In the novel Porterhouse Blue, conflict over an attempt to introduce such a device to a Cambridge college, is one of the factors that leads to murder.

== Safety ==
According to the United States Food and Drug Administration, when using condoms from a machine, one should check the expiration date, that the condoms are latex and labelled for disease prevention, and that the machine is not exposed to direct sunlight or other source of extreme temperatures.

== See also ==
- Emergency contraception
- Safe sex
