= Tom Sharpe =

English satirical novelist (1928–2013)

- Born: Thomas Ridley Sharpe; 30 March 1928; London, England
- Died: 6 June 2013 (aged 85); Llafranc, Catalonia, Spain
- Education: Pembroke College, Cambridge
- Occupation: Novelist
- Writing career
- Language: English
- Notable works: Wilt series, Porterhouse Blue, Blott on the Landscape

Thomas Ridley Sharpe (30 March 1928 – 6 June 2013) was an English satirical novelist, best known for his Wilt series, as well as Porterhouse Blue and Blott on the Landscape, all three of which were adapted for television.

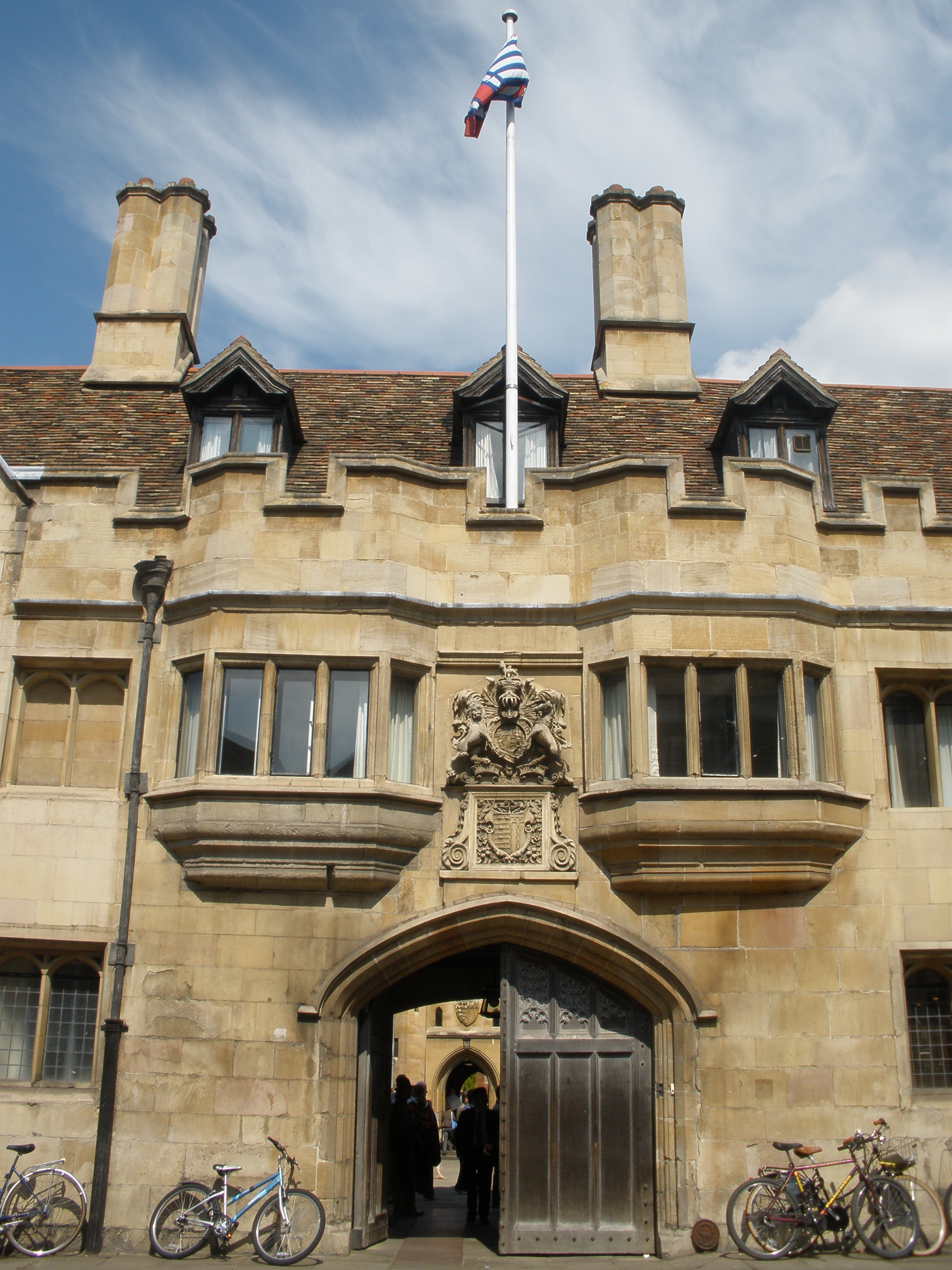
Pembroke College, Cambridge University

== Life ==
Sharpe was born in Holloway, London, and brought up in Croydon. Sharpe's father, the Reverend George Coverdale Sharpe, was a Unitarian minister who was active in far-right politics in the 1930s. He was chairman of the Acton and Ealing branch of The Link, and a member of the Nordic League. He declared that he hated Jews "in the sense that he hated all corruption". Sharpe initially shared some of his father's views, but was horrified on seeing films of the liberation of the Bergen-Belsen concentration camp.

=== University of Cambridge ===
Sharpe was educated at Bloxham School, on which he based Groxbourne in Vintage Stuff, followed by Lancing College. He then did national service in the Royal Marines before being admitted to Pembroke College, Cambridge, where he read history and social anthropology.

=== South Africa ===
Sharpe moved to South Africa in 1951, where he worked as a social worker and a teacher. He was friendly with the activist and artist Harold Strachan until they fell out over a woman. Sharpe's time in South Africa inspired his novels Riotous Assembly and Indecent Exposure, in which he mocked the apartheid regime. He also wrote a play, The South African, which was critical of the regime. After it was performed in London, Sharpe was arrested for sedition in 1961 and deported from South Africa.

=== Teaching and later life ===
After returning to England, Sharpe took a position as a history lecturer at the Cambridge College of Arts and Technology, later Anglia Ruskin University. This experience inspired his Wilt series. From 1995 onward he and his American wife, Nancy, divided their time between Cambridge and their home in Llafranc, Spain, where he wrote Wilt in Nowhere. The couple had three daughters. Despite living in Catalonia, he did not learn either Spanish or Catalan. "I don't want to learn the language," he said, "I don't want to hear what the price of meat is."

=== Death ===
Sharpe died on 6 June 2013 in Llafranc from complications of diabetes at the age of 85. He was reported to have been working on an autobiography. It was also said that he had suffered a stroke a few weeks earlier. Paying tribute, the author Robert McCrum wrote "The Tom Sharpe I knew was generous, acerbic, engaging, and full of wicked fun." Susan Sandon, Sharpe's editor at Random House, remarked that he was "witty, often outrageous, always acutely funny about the absurdities of life". His ashes were interred in the graveyard at the remote church in Thockrington, Northumberland, where his father had been a preacher.

== Adaptations ==
Blott on the Landscape was adapted by BBC TV in 1985 and broadcast in six episodes of 50 minutes each. It was scripted by Malcolm Bradbury and starred George Cole as Sir Giles Lynchwood, Geraldine James as Lady Maud and David Suchet as Blott.

In 1987 Porterhouse Blue was adapted for television, again by Bradbury, in four episodes for Channel 4. It starred David Jason as Skullion and Ian Richardson as Sir Godber Evans.

In 1989 Wilt was made into a film by LWT, featuring Griff Rhys Jones as Henry Wilt, Mel Smith as Inspector Flint and Alison Steadman as Eva Wilt.

== Critical response ==
Michael Dirda said in an interview: "Tom Sharpe is very funny – but exceptionally vulgar, crude and offensive. Many view him as Britain's funniest living novelist. Most people feel that his first two novels, set in a fictionalized South Africa, are his best: Riotous Assembly and Indecent Exposure." Leonard R. N. Ashley wrote in the Encyclopedia of British Humorists that "Sharpe's humorous techniques naturally derive from his fundamental approach, which is that of the furious farceur who compounds anger and amusement." and "His dialogue is deft and more restrained than his characterization, which sometimes is mere caricature ..." Ashley also quotes reviews and comments by many critics, and cites 21 published reviews or critical comments on Sharpe's work, with brief summaries or quotations from each.

=== Influence ===
Martin Levin, in a review of Porterhouse Blue, wrote that "Sharpe is one of England's funniest writers. He's in the tradition of the 19th-century satirist Thomas Love Peacock, who wrote novels of ideas laced with physical, slapstick farce." Adrian Mourby wrote that "Tom Sharpe's Porterhouse Blue and Vintage Stuff are books that hark back to a golden age of academic dottiness, of the kind that has all but disappeared since the 1940s when Sharpe himself was a student." Caroline Moorehead writes (in a review of Faculty Towers: The Academic Novel and its Discontents): "When I was a fellow of Peterhouse, back in the Eighties, I was asked with tedious regularity whether the experience resembled Porterhouse Blue, Tom Sharpe’s grotesquely overblown satire. But even as I (truthfully) denied it, a few vignettes would slide past my mind’s eye – such as my very first Governing Body meeting, when, sombrely robed, the fellows debated, hotly and with manifest ill will, whether the vomit by the chapel was beer- or claret-based."

== Legacy ==
The Los Angeles Times wrote of The Great Pursuit: "No one, from author to critic, goes unscathed in this satire on the publishing business on both sides of the Atlantic. Agent Frensic comes across a deliciously filthy, but anonymous, manuscript that promises bestsellerdom. Frensic supplies a fake author and they are off down the primrose path. Much of this book is funny and devastatingly accurate until the plot disperses ..." More critically, Tom Payne wrote of Wilt in Nowhere: "Even half an hour after reading Tom Sharpe's 14th novel, it's difficult to remember what happened in it. ... Wilt is a victim of our times, and Sharpe doesn't seem to like them much. ... Sharpe might be happier in another age – the 18th century, perhaps – but even then he'd find plenty to rail against. It's tempting to see him as a contemporary Smollett: his plots are guided by whatever vices he feels like including, or whatever images are in his head. ... Wilt in Nowhere isn't Sharpe's finest work. His best tales put the reader firmly in a world: we can cherish the memories of the atavistic dons in Porterhouse Blue, or rail at the South African police in Indecent Exposure (1973). The present novel is simply a hapless tour of bits of England and Florida, in which colourful things happen and puzzle the police."

Sharpe sent up the class-conscious English writer Dornford Yates in Indecent Exposure. He worked on an adaptation of Yates' thriller She Fell Among Thieves for the BBC in 1977, which contained similar elements of parody.

== Bibliography ==
=== Piemburg, South Africa series ===
- Riotous Assembly (1971) ISBN 9780871131430
- Indecent Exposure (1973) ISBN 9780871131423

=== Porterhouse Blue series ===
- Porterhouse Blue (1974) ISBN 9780871132796
- Grantchester Grind (1995) ISBN 9780099466543

=== Wilt series ===
- Wilt (1976) ISBN 9780879517342
- The Wilt Alternative (1979) ISBN 9780394726212
- Wilt on High (1984) ISBN 9780099466482
  - Wilt in Triplicate (omnibus containing the three novels above) (1996) ISBN 9780436204159
- Wilt in Nowhere (2004) ISBN 9780099481737
- The Wilt Inheritance (2010) ISBN 9780091796969

=== Other novels ===
- Blott on the Landscape (1975) ISBN 9780879519278
- The Great Pursuit (1977) ISBN 9780879517335
- The Throwback (1978) ISBN 9780330260121
- Ancestral Vices (1980) ISBN 9780330266352
- Vintage Stuff (1982) ISBN 9780099435549
- The Midden (1996) ISBN 9780879519285
- The Gropes (2009) ISBN 9780091930905
