= Josephine Tewson =

British actress (1931–2022)

- Born: Josephine Ann Tewson; 26 February 1931; Hampstead, London, England
- Died: 18 August 2022 (aged 91); Northwood, London, England
- Occupation: Actress
- Years active: 1952–2019
- Spouses: Leonard Rossiter (m. 1958; div. 1961) Henry Newman (m. 1972; died 1980)

Josephine Ann Tewson (26 February 1931 – 18 August 2022) was an English actress, known for her roles in British television sitcoms and comedies. She portrayed Edna Hawkins ("Mrs H") on Shelley (1979–1982), Jane Travers in Clarence (1988), and Miss Lucinda Davenport in Last of the Summer Wine (2003–2010). She portrayed the frequently put-upon neighbour Elizabeth "Liz" Warden in Keeping Up Appearances (1990–1995). Tewson's professional career lasted more than 65 years, from 1952 until her retirement in 2019.

== Early life and education ==
Tewson, an only child, was born on her father's twenty seventh birthday in Hampstead, London, on 26 February 1931. Her father, William (1904–1965) was a professional musician and played the double bass in the BBC Symphony Orchestra; her mother, Kate (née Morley, 1908–1999), was a nurse and the daughter of footballer Haydn Morley, who captained The Wednesday in the 1890 FA Cup Final. After grammar school, Tewson studied at the Royal Academy of Dramatic Art from which she graduated in 1952.

== Early career ==
Tewson began acting on the London stage in the 1950s and remained active in theatre productions throughout her professional career. She appeared on television during the 1960s with semi-regular appearances on shows like Z-Cars, The Dick Emery Show, and The Charlie Drake Show. She was a regular comedy performer in sketches on David Frost on Sunday and Hark at Barker (1969–1970). She created the role of Mrs. Drudge in the premiere of Tom Stoppard's The Real Inspector Hound at the Criterion Theatre in London in June 1968.

She later appeared in Mostly Monkhouse, a BBC Radio comedy with David Jason and Bob Monkhouse. During the 1970s she had significant roles in comedy sitcoms including Six Dates with Barker, Coppers End (1971), and 1977's Odd Man Out with John Inman playing her half-sibling. She co-starred in No Appointment Necessary with Roy Kinnear; the tapes of which have been lost or destroyed. Tewson played Edna Hawkins (usually referred to as "Mrs H" by Shelley) in the first six series of the British sitcom Shelley (1979–82). Later, she played Jane Travers in Ronnie Barker's last starring television role before his retirement, the sitcom Clarence (1988), which he wrote. She appeared as two characters in the 1984 children's film Gabrielle and the Doodleman, as Gabrielle's father's housekeeper Mrs. Briggs, and as the Fairy Godmother.

Tewson was rumoured to be Inman's cousin, though she denied this in several interviews.

== Later career ==
Tewson's most prominent role was as Elizabeth "Liz" Warden, neighbour and reluctant confidante of social wannabe Hyacinth Bucket in the comedy series Keeping Up Appearances, written by Roy Clarke. She appeared semi-regularly as Miss Davenport in Last of the Summer Wine (2003–2010), a series also written by Clarke. She appeared in two episodes of the documentary series Comedy Connections, talking about her work in Keeping Up Appearances (2004) and opposite The Two Ronnies (2005). In 2009, she played Iris in the radio drama Leaves in Autumn written by Susan Casanove, produced by the Wireless Theatre Company.

Other television appearances included an episode of Heartbeat ("Closing The Book", 2002), and as competition judge Samantha Johnstone in the mystery drama Midsomer Murders ("Judgement Day", 2000). She appeared in two episodes of Doctors as kleptomaniac Audrey Wilson ("Now You See It...", 2009), and as Marjorie Page, a woman in the early stages of Alzheimer's disease ("The Bespectacled Bounder", 2012). Tewson played a school teacher in a Sugar Puffs "I Want My Honey" advert during the late 1980s/early 1990s. Just after the end of Keeping Up Appearances, she played a nanny in a 30-second commercial for Nabisco Fruit Newtons, widely aired in 1997 in the United States.

In 2012 Tewson launched her one-woman show, Still Keeping Up Appearances?, and toured the UK until her retirement in early 2019.

== Personal life and death ==
Tewson married actor Leonard Rossiter in 1958. They divorced in 1961. She married dental surgeon Henry Newman in 1972. Newman died in 1980. Tewson died from complications of Alzheimer's disease and diabetes at Denville Hall, a retirement home in London for actors and other entertainment professionals, on 18 August 2022, aged 91.

== Filmography ==
=== Film ===
Year	Title	Role	Notes
1972	The Troublesome Double	Mrs Wentworth	
1977	The Strange Case of the End of Civilization as We Know It	Miss Hoskins	
1978	The Hound of the Baskervilles	Nun	
1984	Gabrielle and the Doodleman	Mrs Briggs/Fairy Godmother	
1989	Wilt	Miss Leuchars	
2000	The Mumbo Jumbo	Miss Hodges	

=== Television ===
Year	Title	Role	Notes
1959	Preview	Joan Garnett	Episode: "Marriage Bureau"
1959	Charlesworth	Mrs. Furse	Episode: "Long Hot Spell"
1963	ITV Play of the Week	Barmaid	Episode: "Double Stakes"
1963	No Hiding Place	Mavis Peters	Episode: "Four Faces of Clare"
1963	First Night	Mrs Tullet	Episode: "The Initiation"
1963-1968	Z-Cars	Various	3 episodes
1964	No Hiding Place	June Merrall	Episode: "The Things Money Can Buy"
1965	The Sullavan Brothers	WPC	Episode: "The Outsider"
1965	Emergency Ward 10	Mrs. Close	5 episodes
1966	Sergeant Cork	Martha St. Clair	Episode: "The Case of the Devil's Daughter"
1967	Emergency Ward 10	Dr. Saunders	Episode: "Devil Doll"
1967	Mrs Thursday	Dulcie Ainsworth	Episode: "The Old School Tie Up"
1968	The Charlie Drake Show	Various	6 episodes
1968	Frost on Sunday	Various	14 episodes
1969	The Champions	Hotel switchboard operator	Episode: "The Night People"
1969–1970	Hark at Barker	Mildred Bates	All 15 episodes
1969–1979	The Dick Emery Show	Various	15 episodes
1970	ITV Saturday Night Theatre	Gladys	Episode: "Suffer Little Children"
1971	Six Dates with Barker	Travers	Episode: "1937: The Removals Person"
1971	Copper's End	WPS Penny Pringle	13 episodes
1971–1981	The Two Ronnies	Various	5 episodes
1972	His Lordship Entertains	Mildred Bates	All 7 episodes
1973	Comedy Playhouse	Lady Cynthia	Episode: "Elementary My Dear Watson"
1973	Whoops Baghdad!	Fatima	Episode: "The Wazir Takes a Wife"
1973	It's Tarbuck	Various	6 episodes
1973	Son of the Bride	Miss McDowdie	All 6 episodes
1973	Casanova '73	Mrs Kershaw	Episode: #1.3
1973	Tell Tarby	Various	6 episodes
1974	Thriller	Yvonne	Episode: "A Coffin for the Bride "
1975	Tarbuck and All That!	Various	5 episodes
1975	Wodehouse Playhouse	Mabel Potts	Episode: "Rodney Fails to Qualify"
1975	Dawson's Weekly	Cleoberry	Episode: "Stage-Struck"
1975	Larry Grayson	Various	2 episodes
1976	Happy Ever After	Mrs Robins	Episode: "Mistaken Identikit"
1976	Lucky Feller	Shirley	Episode: "Where There's Life There's Soap"
1977	Whodunnit?	Miss Frisby	Episode: "No Happy Returns"
1977	No Appointment Necessary	Penelope Marshall	All 7 episodes
1977	Odd Man Out	Dorothy Sutcliffe	All 7 episodes
1979	Rings on Their Fingers	Mrs Harris	Episode: "Home Market"
1979–1984	Shelley	Edna Hawkins	23 episodes
1983-1985	Terry and June	Brenda/Mrs. Robins	2 episodes
1983	Tears Before Bedtime	Beatrice	Episode: "Show Me the Way to Leave Home"
1985	The Caucasian Chalk Circle	Various	TV film
1987	Rude Health	Mrs Thorpe	8 episodes
1988	Clarence	Jane Travers	All 6 episodes
1990–1995	Keeping Up Appearances	Elizabeth "Liz" Warden	43 episodes
1994	Coronation Street	Peggy Phillips	2 episodes
1999	Sunburn	Louise Montague	Episode: #1.1
2000	Midsomer Murders	Samantha Johnstone	Episode: "Judgement Day"
2002	Heartbeat	Mrs Morris	S11 E12: "Closing the Book"
2003–2010	Last of the Summer Wine	Miss Lucinda Davenport	62 episodes
2006	Holby City	Mabel Phillips	Episode: "Looking After Number One"
2009-2015	Doctors	Various	3 episodes
2012	Lewis	Hazel O'Brien	Episode: "The Indelible Stain"

=== Theatre roles ===
Year	Production	Role	Venue
1957	Free as Air	Ivy Crush	Savoy Theatre, West End
1961	Androcles and the Lion	Megaera	Mermaid Theatre, London
1964	Coriolanus		Nottingham Playhouse, Nottingham
1966	The Ballad of False Barman		Hampstead Theatre, London
1968	The Real Inspector Hound	Mrs. Drudge	Vaudeville Theatre, West End
1972	A Cuckoo in the Nest		Thorndike Theatre
1976	Absurd Person Singular		Wimbledon Theatre, London
1985	Noises Off	Dotty Otley	Savoy Theatre, West End
1986–87	Woman in Mind	Muriel	Vaudeville Theatre, West End
?	Moscow Shadows	Natasha	New End Theatre, Hampstead
?	See How They Run	Miss Skillon	Watermill Theatre, Newbury
1989	Last of the Red Hot Lovers	Jeanette Fisher	Strand Theatre, West End
1994	Arsenic and Old Lace	Abby Brewster	Yvonne Arnaud Theatre, Guildford and tour
1995	The Killing of Sister George	Mercy Croft	Ambassadors Theatre, West End
?	The Importance of Being Earnest	Lady Bracknell	Horseshoe Theatre, Basingstoke
?	Talking Heads: A Lady of Letters		Swan Theatre, Worcester
1998	Romeo and Juliet	Nurse	Salisbury Playhouse, Wiltshire and tour
2002	A Woman of No Importance	Lady Hunstanton	No. 1 Tour
2004	The Importance of Being Earnest	Miss Prism	No. 1 Tour
2008	Salonika	Charlotte	West Yorkshire Playhouse, Leeds
2009	Separate Tables	Lady Matheson	Chichester Festival Theatre

=== Radio ===
Year	Title	Role	Company
1971, 1973	The Secret Life of Kenneth Williams	Maisie	BBC Radio
Early 1970s	Mostly Monkhouse	Various	BBC Radio
July 1981	It Sticks Out Half a Mile	Miss Baines	BBC Radio
1994	Uncle Dynamite	Lady Bostock	BBC Radio
2009	Leaves in Autumn	Iris	Wireless Theatre Company
