= Freddie Earlle =

Scottish actor (1924–2007)

- Born: Frederick Medvidoff; 24 May 1924; Glasgow, Scotland
- Died: 7 July 2007 (aged 83); Estepona, Spain
- Occupations: Actor, comedian
- Years active: 1961–1999
- Spouse(s): Freda Mundy Pearlman (m. 1950; div. 195?); Naomi Mendel (m. 1963) (3 children)
- Children: 3

Freddie Earlle (24 May 1924 – 7 July 2007) was a Scottish actor. He was known for his comedic appearances on television. His memorable roles are being a regular in series 6 of It's a Square World, playing Francois Tournignon in the 1972 BBC adaptation of Clochemerle, Corporal Miguel Pasquale in ITV sitcom Yanks Go Home and Mungo Boyd in BBC Scotland's 1980 dramatisation of Doom Castle.

== Early life ==
Born as the eldest son into a Russian Orthodox Jewish family who worked in the wholesale business, Earlle became interested in theatre as a boy. At the age of five, he performed in his school's percussion band, broadcasting from Glasgow. This was followed by doing Gang Shows with the Boy Scouts and by the age of 15, he was producing.

Upon leaving school, Earlle took up hairdressing, being an apprentice barber in a family-bought business. Impressed by his personality and talent for telling jokes, clients encouraged him to go into show business. He closed the shop when comedian Tommy Morgan gave him his chance in show business.

== Career ==
Being anti-superstitious, Earlle chose 13 as his lucky number after going to the Princess Theatre every year as a boy to watch pantomimes. It was traditional for the company to have 13 letters in the titles of their pantomimes. After being named Freddie Earl by Morgan, he added the LE onto the surname and hence his stage name was created.

Beginning his career in vaudeville as a comedian in the late 1940s, Earlle progressed to become a performer in music halls. With his first wife, Freda Mundy, they performed a variety and cabaret act called Mundy and Earle (being 13 letters due to the latter's insistence), being known as "a boy, a girl and a gramophone". At times, they shared the bill with the likes of Laurel and Hardy, Frank Sinatra, Gypsy Rose Lee and Peter Sellers. He also did stand-up comedy, performing at Butlins holiday camps amongst other gigs, as well as compering pop shows.

Earlle's career moved onto television and as a result, he found himself having parts in No Hiding Place, The Plane Makers, Ghost Squad, ITV Play of the Week, R3, Virgin of the Secret Service, Sherlock Holmes, Hark at Barker, Counterstrike, Paul Temple, Six Dates with Barker, Comedy Playhouse, Dad's Army (episodes - The Royal Train and When You've Got to Go), Sykes, The Liver Birds, The Brothers, Z-Cars, It Ain't Half Hot Mum, Going Straight, Wilde Alliance, The Basil Brush Show, Robin's Nest, Yes Minister, Bergerac, Rainbow, Triangle, Hi-de-Hi!, Farrington of the F.O., C.A.T.S. Eyes, The Bourne Identity, The Paradise Club, The Bill, Taggart, Coronation Street and London's Burning. On stage, his favourite role was as Doc in West Side Story.

== Personal life ==
After divorcing Freda Mundy, Earlle began a relationship with Naomi Mendel. They moved to England in 1958 and had a daughter, Rosalind before getting married in 1963. Afterwards, they had two further children, Sara (born 1964) and Michael (born 1970).

For a while, Earlle combined his acting with solo cabaret work. However, when the music halls closed in 1965, he took his wife and two daughters to Israel to live and work on a kibbutz. They returned home in June 1967 as he missed his acting and so resumed his career.

Rosalind became a charity manager and married screenwriter Christopher H. Bidmead, who was script editor on Doctor Who during 1980–81. As a result, Earlle was cast in Warriors' Gate.

Retiring from acting in 1999, Earlle moved to southern Spain where he resided for his final eight years.
