= Inspector Morse =

Fictional character by Colin Dexter

Detective Chief Inspector Endeavour Morse GM
- First appearance: 1975: novel Last Bus to Woodstock
- Created by: Colin Dexter
- Portrayed by: John Thaw (television) (1987–2000); Shaun Evans (television) (2012–2023)
- Appears in: 13 novels (1975–1999); Inspector Morse television series (1987–2000); Endeavour television series (2012–2023)
- Also portrayed by: Andrew Burt (BBC Radio) (1985); John Shrapnel (BBC Radio) (1992–96); Colin Baker (stage) (2010); Nigel Fairs (stage) (2015); Neil Pearson (BBC Radio) (2017-2018); Tom Chambers (stage) (2025)

In-universe information
- Title: Detective Chief Inspector
- Family: Cyril Morse (father); Constance Morse (mother); Gwen Morse (stepmother); Joyce Garrett (half-sister)
- Relatives: Marilyn Garrett (niece); Wayne Garrett (nephew)
- Nationality: British
- Decorations: George Medal (television 1967)
- Born: 1930 (television: 1938)
- Died: 1999: novel The Remorseful Day (television: 2000)
- Alma mater: St John's College, Oxford

Detective Chief Inspector Endeavour Morse, GM, is the eponymous fictional character in the series of detective novels by British author Colin Dexter.

On television he was portrayed by John Thaw in a 33-episode drama series, Inspector Morse (1987–2000), and by Shaun Evans in the prequel series Endeavour (2012–2023). The older Morse is a senior Criminal Investigation Department (CID) officer, while the younger is a detective constable rising through the ranks with the Oxford City Police and, in later seasons, Thames Valley Police.

Morse presents, to some, a reasonably sympathetic personality, despite his sullen and snobbish temperament. He is known for his classic Jaguar Mark 2 (a Lancia in the early novels), thirst for English real ale, and love of classical music (especially opera and Wagner), poetry, art and cryptic crossword puzzles. In his later career he is usually assisted by Sergeant Robbie Lewis, a partnership and formal friendship which is fundamental to the series. Morse uses Lewis’ first name, Robbie for the first time in S5, E5 "Promised Land" before going to face a kidnapper and potential killer.

== Biography ==
=== Family ===
Morse's father was a taxi driver. In the episode of the television adaptation Cherubim and Seraphim, it is revealed that Morse's parents divorced when he was 12. He remained with his mother until her death three years later, upon which he had to return to his father. Morse had a dreadful relationship with his stepmother Gwen. He claims that he only read poetry to annoy her, and that her petty bullying almost drove him to suicide. He has a half-sister named Joyce with whom he is on better terms. Morse was devastated when Joyce's daughter Marilyn took her own life.

Morse prefers to use only his surname, and is generally evasive when asked about his first name, sometimes joking that it is Inspector. "Everyone just calls me Morse. I do have a first name." In The Dead of Jericho it is remarked that "he had never quite forgiven his parents for christening their only offspring as they had." Also in The Dead of Jericho, and in The Wench Is Dead, it is noted that his initial is E. At the end of Death Is Now My Neighbour, his name is revealed to be Endeavour. Two-thirds of the way through the television episode based on the book, he gives the cryptic clue "My whole life's effort has revolved around Eve, nine letters". In the series, it is noted that Morse's reluctance to use his Christian name led to his receiving the nickname Pagan (Deceived by Flight) while at Stamford School (which Colin Dexter, the author of the Morse novels, attended). In the novels, Morse's first name came from the vessel HMS Endeavour; his mother was a member of the Religious Society of Friends (Quakers) who have a tradition of "virtue names", and his father admired Captain James Cook.

Dexter was a fan of cryptic crossword and named Morse after champion setter Jeremy Morse, one of Dexter's arch-rivals in writing crossword clues. Dexter used to walk along the bank of the River Thames at Oxford, opposite the boathouse belonging to 22nd Oxford Sea Scout Group; the building is named T.S. Endeavour.

=== Education ===
Although details of Morse's education are kept vague, it is hinted that he won a scholarship to study at St John's College, Oxford. He lost the scholarship as the result of poor academic performance stemming from a failed love affair, which is mentioned in the second episode of the third series, "The Last Enemy", and recounted in detail in the novel The Riddle of the Third Mile, Chapter 7. Further details are revealed piece-by-piece in the prequel series. He often reflects on such renowned scholars as A. E. Housman who, like himself, failed to get an academic degree from Oxford.

=== Career ===
After university, he entered the army on National Service. This included serving in West Germany with the Royal Corps of Signals as a cipher clerk. Upon leaving, he joined the police at Carshall-Newtown, before being posted to Oxford with the Oxford City Police. He was awarded the George Medal in the last episode of Endeavour Series 4, which he refrains from wearing on his uniform. He is assigned to a uniformed position in Series 6 and his opinions and observations are disregarded by CID.

=== Habits and personality ===
Morse is the embodiment of middle-class Englishness, with a set of prejudices and assumptions to match, although his background, being the son of a taxi driver, might be considered working class. He claims to have a private income from his father driving for the Aga Khan, but this may be a joke. Due to his manners and bearing, he is sometimes considered gentleman detective, the staple of British detective fiction, in contrast to the working-class lifestyle of his assistant Lewis. In the novels, Lewis is Welsh, but in the TV series this is altered to a Tyneside (Geordie) background, appropriately for the actor Kevin Whately. Morse is in his forties at the start of the books (Service of all the Dead, Chapter Six: "… a bachelor still, forty-seven years old …"), and Lewis slightly younger (e.g. The Secret of Annexe 3, Chapter Twenty-Six: "a slightly younger man – another policeman, and one also in plain clothes"). John Thaw was 45 at the beginning of shooting the TV series and Kevin Whately was 36.

Morse's relationships with authority, the establishment, bastions of power and the status quo, are markedly ambiguous, as are some of his relations with women. He is frequently portrayed as patronising female characters, and once stereotyped the female sex as not naturally prone to crime, being caring and non-violent, but also often empathises with women. He is not shy to show his liking for attractive women and often dates those involved in cases. Indeed, a woman he falls in love with sometimes turns out to be the culprit.

Morse is highly intelligent. He is a crossword addict and dislikes grammatical and spelling errors; in every personal or private document that he receives, he manages to point out at least one mistake. He claims that his approach to crime-solving is deductive, and one of his key tenets is that "there is a 50 per cent chance that the person who finds the body is the murderer". Morse uses immense intuition and his fantastic memory to apprehend the perpetrator.

Among Morse's conservative tastes are that he likes to drink real ale and whisky, (which he calls “brain food”) and likes to drink while thinking about cases despite doctors’ advice on cutting down. In the early novels, Morse drives a Lancia. In the television and radio productions (and reprints of the novels), this is altered to a Jaguar Mark 2. His favourite music is opera, which is echoed in the soundtracks to the television series. The original music is by Barrington Pheloung, which has been made into Morse Code and spells out Inspector Morse.

His dying words, said to Jim Strange, (who liked calling Morse, “matey” due to their long working relationship together), are "Thank Lewis for me."

Morse is portrayed as being an atheist. However, in some scenes, he does entertain the possibility of God and/or quote the Bible from memory, agreeing with the phrases, as he does with lines from various literary books/texts.

== Novels ==
The novels in the series are:

- Last Bus to Woodstock (1975)
- Last Seen Wearing (1976)
- The Silent World of Nicholas Quinn (1977)
- Service of All the Dead (1979)
- The Dead of Jericho (1981)
- The Riddle of the Third Mile (1983)
- The Secret of Annexe 3 (1986)
- The Wench is Dead (1989)
- The Jewel That Was Ours (1991)
- The Way Through the Woods (1992)
- The Daughters of Cain (1994)
- Death Is Now My Neighbour (1996)
- The Remorseful Day (1999)

Inspector Morse also appears in several stories in Dexter's short story collection, Morse's Greatest Mystery and Other Stories (1993, expanded edition 1994).

The 2008 short story The Mystery of the Drunken Driver (appearing in the Daily Mail) is set during Morse's undergraduate years. It was reprinted as Mr E. Morse, BA Oxon (Failed) in 2010.

== In other media ==
=== Television ===
==== Inspector Morse (1987–2000) ====
The Inspector Morse novels were made into a TV series (also called Inspector Morse) for the British commercial TV network ITV. The series was made by Zenith Productions for Central (a company later acquired by Carlton) and comprised 33 two-hour episodes (100 minutes excluding commercials)—20 more episodes than there are novels—produced between 6 January 1987 and 15 November 2000. The last episode was adapted from the final novel The Remorseful Day, in which Morse dies from a heart attack. Morse was played by John Thaw and Lewis by Kevin Whateley.

==== Lewis (2006–2015) ====
A spin-off series, similarly comprising 33 two-hour episodes and based on the television incarnation of Lewis, was titled Lewis; it first aired on 29 January 2006 and last showed on 10 November 2015. The spin-off consisted the following cast members: Whately as DI Robbie Lewis, Laurence Fox as DS James Hathaway, Clare Holman as Dr Laura Hobson and Rebecca Front as CS Jean Innocent.

==== Endeavour (2012–2023) ====
In August 2011, ITV announced plans to film a prequel drama called Endeavour, with author Colin Dexter's participation. English actor Shaun Evans was cast as a young Morse in his early career. The pilot episode was broadcast on 2 January 2012 on ITV. The prequel was made by Mammoth Screen. Four new episodes were televised from 14 April 2013, showing Morse's early cases working for DI Fred Thursday (Roger Allam) and with Jim Strange (Sean Rigby), initially as PC Jim Strange, later DS Jim Strange, and pathologist Max De Bryn (James Bradshaw), plus Chief Superintendent Reginald Bright (Anton Lesser), DS Peter Jakes (Jack Laskey), WPC Shirley Trewlove (Dakota Blue Richards), DC George Fancy (Lewis Peek), DI Ronnie Box (Simon Harrison) and DS Alan Jago (Richard Riddell). Alongside the police department, the prequel also consisted of Fred Thursday’s family members: Win Thursday, (Caroline O’Neill), Sam Thursday (Jack Bannon), Joan Thursday (Sara Vickers) and the newspaper editor Dorothea Frazil (Abigail Thaw). A second series of four episodes followed, screening between 30 March 2014 and 20 April 2014. On 3 January 2016, the third series aired, also containing four episodes. A fourth series was aired, once again with four episodes, on 8 January 2017. Filming of a fifth series of six episodes began in early 2017 with the first episode of the fifth series aired on 4 February 2018. On 10 February 2019 the sixth series aired, which comprises four 1-hour-30-minute episodes. A seventh series of three episodes was filmed in late 2019, aired on 9 February 2020 and in August 2019 ITV announced that the series had been recommissioned for an eighth series, screened on 12 September 2021, also containing three episodes. Morse was voted number two on the top 25 list in ITV's Britain's Favourite Detective first broadcast on 30 August 2020.

On 23 May 2022, a day after filming began for the ninth series, ITV announced that Endeavour would end production after a decade on air at the conclusion of the ninth series, bringing the total number of Endeavour episodes to 36. The ninth and final series comprised the final three episodes, which aired from 26 February 2023 to 12 March 2023.

=== Radio ===
An adaptation by Melville Jones of Last Bus to Woodstock featured in BBC Radio 4's Saturday Night Theatre series in June 1985, with Andrew Burt as Morse and Christopher Douglas as Lewis.

In the 1990s, an occasional BBC Radio 4 series (for The Saturday Play) was made starring the voices of John Shrapnel as Morse and Robert Glenister as Lewis. The series was written by Guy Meredith and directed by Ned Chaillet. Episodes included: The Wench is Dead (23 March 1992); Last Seen Wearing (28 May 1994); and The Silent World of Nicholas Quinn (10 February 1996).

In 2017, Alma Cullen dramatised her 2010 Morse stage play House of Ghosts as a Radio 4 production starring Neil Pearson as Morse, and Lee Ingleby as Lewis. A year later, Cullen penned an original drama entitled Morse: In The Shallows, with Pearson and Ingleby reprising their roles.

=== Theatre ===
An Inspector Morse stage play appeared in 2010, written by Alma Cullen (writer of four Morse screenplays for ITV). The part of Morse was played by Colin Baker. The play, entitled Morse—House of Ghosts, saw DCI Morse looking to his past, when an old acquaintance becomes the lead suspect in a murder case that involves the on-stage death of a young actress. The play toured the UK from August to December 2010. Subsequent stagings include Weymouth, Dorset in 2015 with Nigel Fairs, and a 2025-2026 touring production starring Tom Chambers.
