= Nigel McCrery =

English screenwriter, producer and writer (1953–2025)

- Born: 30 October 1953; Essex, England
- Died: 6 February 2025 (aged 71); Nottingham, England
- Occupations: Screenwriter, producer, writer
- Spouse: Gillian Copson (m. 1976; div. 2005)
- Children: Luke, Emily and Rebecca

Nigel Colin McCrery (30 October 1953 – 6 February 2025) was an English screenwriter, producer and writer. He was the creator of the long-running crime dramas Silent Witness (1996–present) and New Tricks (2003–2015).

== Early life ==
McCrery was born in Essex on 30 October 1953. His father, Colin McCrery, served in the RAF, so the family travelled during his early childhood before settling in Nottingham. He attended George Spencer Secondary School in Stapleford.

== Police career ==
After working in a series of jobs, McCrery joined the Nottinghamshire Constabulary in 1978. He worked on a number of murder cases and became interested in forensic science. In August 1987, he left the police to read modern history at Trinity College, Cambridge.

== Writing career ==
McCrery wrote a number of books, including crime novels as well as non-fiction publications on both forensic science and military history and he also wrote several plays. His first play, Going Home, was about a survivor of the Holocaust who returns home after World War II.

== Broadcasting ==
McCrery was selected for the BBC's Graduate Entry Scheme in 1990. After working on a variety of BBC documentaries, he joined the BBC drama department in 1992, becoming the researcher on Our Friends in the North. He then went on to create the series Backup (1995–1997), the long-running series Silent Witness, the television film All The King's Men (1999) starring David Jason and Maggie Smith, the 1950s-set medical drama series Born and Bred (2002–2006), and a further television film, Impact (2003), as well as the series New Tricks (2003–2015).

In 1992, while working as an assistant producer on the BBC1 show Tomorrow's World, McCrery arranged for the remains of the Tsar Nicholas II and the rest of the Russian Royal Family, executed by the Bolsheviks in 1918, to be flown to the UK for DNA examination to verify their identities. McCrery's car was then used to convey the bones of nine Romanovs to their destination. He wrote in his book Silent Witnesses: "There can't be many people who've had an entire royal family in the boot of their car".

== Charity work ==
In 1988, McCrery persuaded Sebastian Coe and Steve Cram to race around the Great Court at Trinity College, replicating a scene in the film Chariots of Fire. The event raised £50,000 for Great Ormond Street Hospital.

McCrery was also involved with the charity Care after Combat, which visits and helps former military personnel in prison.

== Personal life, illness and death ==
McCrery was dyslexic. His school invited him back in 2013 to open their new learning and inclusion centre, named for him.

McCrery married Gillian Copson in 1976. The couple, who had three children, a son and two daughters, divorced in 2005.

In October 2024, in an interview on BBC Radio 4, McCrery revealed that he had recently been diagnosed with a terminal illness. He died in Nottingham, on 6 February 2025, aged 71.

== Bibliography ==
=== Fiction ===
- Core of Evil (2007; also published as Still Waters)
- Tooth and Claw (2009)
- Scream (2010)
- The Thirteenth Coffin (2015)
- Flesh and Blood (2017)
- Blood Line (2018)

=== Non-fiction ===
- For Conspicuous Gallantry: A Brief History of the Recipients of the Victoria Cross from Nottinghamshire and Derbyshire (1990)
- The Vanished Battalion: One of the Great Mysteries of the First World War Finally Solved (1992; also published as All the King's Men)
- Shoot!: How to Make a Video Film to Professional Standards (1993)
- Under the Guns of the Red Baron: The Complete Record of Von Richthofen's Victories and Victims Fully Illustrated (with Norman L. R. Franks and Hal Giblin, 1995)
- The Complete History of the SAS: The Full Story of the World's Most Feared Special Forces (with Barry Davies, 2003)
- Go!, Go!, Go!: The Dramatic Inside Story of the Iranian Embassy Siege (2008)
- Into Touch: Rugby Internationals Killed in the Great War (2013)
- Silent Witnesses: A History of Forensic Science (2013)
- The Fallen Few of the Battle of Britain (2015)
- The Final Season: The Footballers who Fought and Died in the Great War (2015)
- Final Wicket: Test and First-Class Cricketers killed in the Great War (2015)
- The Extinguished Flame: Olympians Killed in the Great War (2016),
- Hear the Boat Sing: Oxford and Cambridge Rowers Killed in World War I (2017)
- The Coming Storm: Test and First-Class Cricketers Killed in World War Two (2017)
- Final Scrum: Rugby Internationals Killed in the Second World War (2018)
- Season in Hell: British Footballers Killed in the Second World War (2019)
- The Undying Flame: Olympians Who Perished in the Second World War (2021)
- Dambusters: The Crews and Their Bombers (2021)
- Virtus Vera Nobilitas: Students from Trinity College Cambridge Who Died During the Great War (2024)
