= His Lordship Entertains =

1972 British television comedy series

- Directed by: Harold Snoad
- Starring: Ronnie Barker; Josephine Tewson; David Jason; Mary Baxter; Moira Foot; Frank Gatliff
- Country of origin: United Kingdom
- No. of episodes: 7 (6 missing)

Production
- Producer: Harold Snoad
- Running time: 30 minutes

Original release
- Network: BBC2
- Release: 5 June – 17 July 1972

His Lordship Entertains is a 1972 television series showing Ronnie Barker's second vehicle for his Lord Rustless character, which was first seen three years earlier in Hark at Barker on ITV. This time though, Rustless appeared in a series for BBC2. Hark at Barker had also included sketch inserts, while His Lordship Entertains was a sitcom.

Set again in the aristocratic Chrome Hall, which had now become a hotel. It once more starred David Jason as the 100-year-old Dithers and Josephine Tewson as Mildred Bates, two actors who would continue to have a working relationships with Barker. In fact all of the regular cast reprised their roles from Hark at Barker.

Barker wrote all the scripts under the pseudonym Jonathan Cobbald. He liked to refer to the show as "Fawlty Towers mark one" as it appeared on television three years before that other hotel bound sitcom.

Four episodes of the sitcom have been performed on stage by the University of Nottingham's New Theatre.

== Archive status ==
For many years it was thought that the series had been entirely lost. However, the first episode of His Lordship Entertains, 'The Food Inspector', was recovered in 2009. In addition the scripts were published in Ronnie Barker's anthology All I Ever Wrote.

== Cast ==
- Ronnie Barker as Lord Rustless
- Josephine Tewson as Mildred Bates
- David Jason as Dithers
- Mary Baxter as Cook
- Moira Foot as Effie
- Frank Gatliff as Badger
- Mary Merrall as Mrs Ringer
- Bart Allison as Mr Blunt
- Gladys Henson as Mrs Ringer's friend
- Diana King as Harriet
- Anthony Sharp as Sir Geoffrey Quick
- Michael Knowles as Mr Smith
- Walter Sparrow as Mr Flint
- Patrick Troughton as The Sheik
- Colin Bean as guest
- Pamela Cundell as Mrs Featherstone
