= Frank Beck (British Army officer) =

British land agent and British Army officer

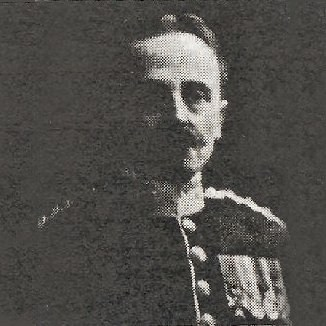
- Captain Frank Beck
- Born: Frank Reginald Beck; 3 May 1861; Oxwick, Norfolk, England
- Died: 12 August 1915 (aged 54); Suvla, Ottoman Empire
- Cause of death: Killed in action
- Occupation: Land agent for the British royal family
- Spouse: Mary Plumpton Wilson (m. 1891)
- Children: 6

Captain Frank Reginald Beck, MVO (3 May 1861 – 12 August 1915) was a land agent to the British royal family. He helped to form a volunteer company comprising members of the royal staff. Under his leadership this unit fought in the Gallipoli campaign of 1915. Following the landings at Suvla Bay, as part of the August Offensive, Beck and many of his men went missing, presumed killed.

== Early life and career ==
Born in Oxwick, Norfolk, Beck was the son of Edmund Beck, land agent to the British royal family at Sandringham. Educated at Norfolk County School, North Elmham, he inherited his father's position on the King's estate, serving as Land Agent at Sandringham to Edward VII when Prince of Wales, 1891–1901, and when King, 1901–10; and to King George V from 1910 until the First World War. He was appointed a Member of the Royal Victorian Order (4th Class) in 1901, and created a Knight of the Order of St Olav by the King of Norway in 1906.

Beck was instrumental in the formation of the Sandringham Company of Volunteers ("E" Company, 5th Battalion Norfolk Regiment, Territorial Force), which included grooms, gardeners, farm labourers and household staff from the King's estates. Beck raised the company as a Volunteer Force unit in 1906, with his commission as captain dated 19 May; he was commissioned a captain in the Territorial Force on 1 April 1908.

== War service and death ==
Despite his age and the fact King George V told him not to go, Beck volunteered for foreign service after the outbreak of war and served with the Mediterranean Expeditionary Force at Gallipoli, leading his company during the attack on Anafarta on 12 August 1915. He fought alongside his two nephews, Arthur Evelyn and Albert Edward Alexander Beck, who were both awarded the Military Cross. On that day, a large part of the Norfolks, including Beck and many of the Sandringham men, were missing in action. For several years, nothing was known of their fate, and a legend grew that the battalion had vanished into a mysterious cloud.

Queen Alexandra, King Edward VII's widow, took a particular interest in establishing what had happened to the men, many of whom had been her employees. After the 1918 Armistice of Mudros, 180 bodies were found "scattered over an area of about one square mile, at a distance of at least 800 yards behind the Turkish front line." This information was kept from Queen Alexandra as it was felt she would be too distressed at the news. Beck's body was not identified.

Beck's watch, given to him in 1915 by Sir Dighton Probyn, was bought from a Turkish officer after the war. It was presented to his heirs in 1922 and remains in the family's possession.

== Memorials ==
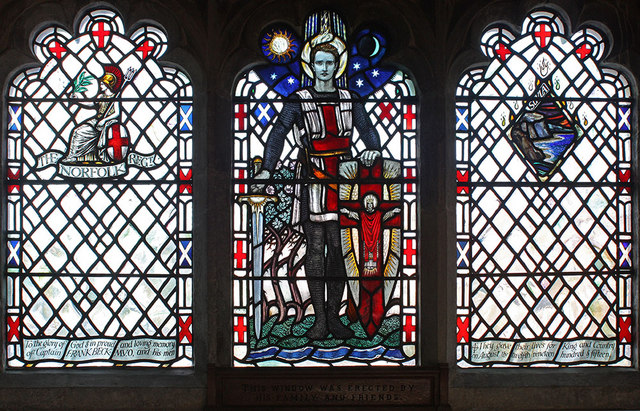
Memorial window in the Church of St Peter and St Paul, West Newton, Norfolk

Beck is commemorated on the Helles Memorial, with other servicemen with no known grave. There is a brass plaque in the Church of St Mary Magdalene, Sandringham and a stained glass window (by Karl Parsons) in the Church of St Peter and St Paul, West Newton. Beck and 18 other men from the company who died at Suvla Bay are commemorated on the Sandringham war memorial cross and at West Newton parish church.

== Film portrayal ==
In 1999, a film was made, entitled All the King's Men, depicting the formation of the Sandringham company, its fate, and Beck's role in this. Beck was portrayed by David Jason.

== Family ==
Beck married Mary Plumpton Wilson in 1891 and had five daughters. His only son died in infancy.

== See also ==
- List of people who disappeared mysteriously: 1910–1990
