= Childwall Sports and Science Academy =

Location
- Fiveways; Queens Drive; Liverpool, Merseyside, L15 6XZ; England
- Coordinates: 53.399112°N 2.899525°W

Information
- Type: Academy
- Motto: Engage, Enable, Empower
- Department for Education URN: 138787 Tables
- Ofsted: Reports
- Headteacher: Janette Vincent
- Staff: 100+
- Gender: Mixed
- Age: 11 to 19
- Enrolment: 1048
- Capacity: 1200
- Website: www.childwallssa.org

Childwall Sports and Science Academy is a secondary school in Liverpool, England, with a sixth form. It is an academy and part of the Lydiate Learning Trust.

== Academic performance and inspections ==
As of 2022, the college's most recent inspection by Ofsted was in May 2022, with a judgement of Good. Judgements from earlier years were:

- 2014: Requires Improvement
- 2016: Requires Improvement
- 2018: Requires Improvement

In 2019 the school's Progress 8 score at GCSE was 0.61, "well below average". The Attainment 8 score was 38, compared to 41 in Liverpool as a whole. 17% of children that year were entered for the English Baccalaureate, compared to the Liverpool average of 31%. 24% of children that year achieved grade 5 or above in maths and English at GCSE, compared to 36% in Liverpool. At A-Level in 2019 the average grade was D+, compared to C in Liverpool as a whole.

== History ==
The school was originally known as Holt High School for Boys. It was located on Queen's Drive. It had around 600 boys and a three-form entry in the mid 1940s.

It became the co-educational Holt Comprehensive School in September 1967, when Holt High School for Boys merged with Olive Mount School for Girls. It later was renamed to Childwall Comprehensive School, then Childwall Community School. After becoming a specialist Sports College, the school was renamed Childwall Sports College.

== Notable former pupils ==
=== Childwall Valley High School for Girls ===
- Alma Cullen, screenwriter and playwright
- Alison Steadman OBE, actress
- Marion Studholme, soprano with the Sadler's Wells Opera Company, now English National Opera (ENO)
- Pauline Yates, actress

=== Holt High School for Boys ===
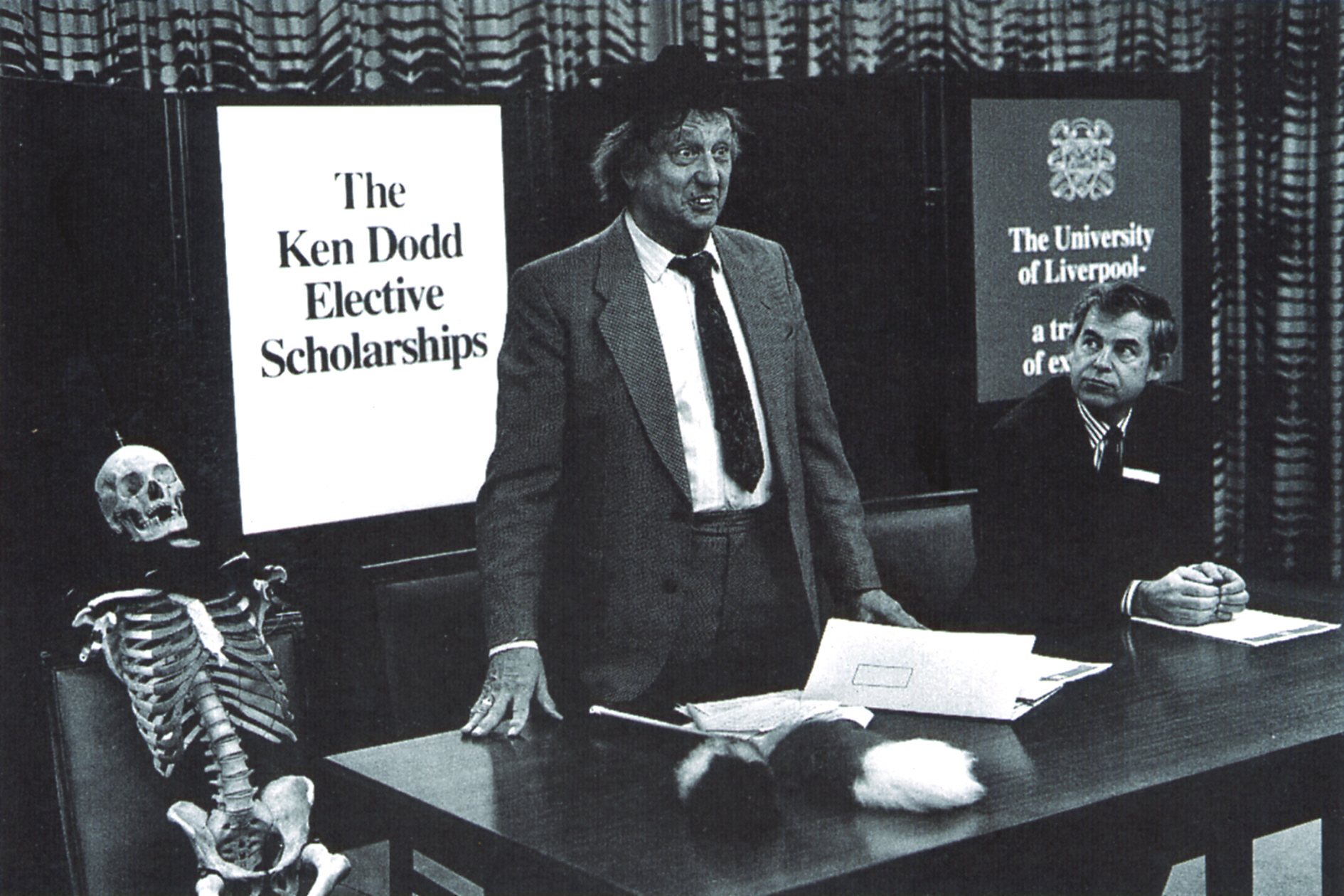
The Ken Dodd Elective Scholarships - University of Liverpool

- Prof John Horton Conway FRS, mathematician and Professor Emeritus at Princeton University, known for Conway's Game of Life
- Sir Ken Dodd OBE, comedian
- John Shirley-Quirk CBE, bass-baritone
- Sir David Webster, Chief Executive from 1945-70 of the Royal Opera House
- Mal Evans, road manager and personal assistant for The Beatles

=== Holt Comprehensive School ===
- Rt Rev Nicholas Baines, Bishop of Croydon from 2003, subsequently Bishop of Bradford
- Tony Bellew, former professional boxer
- Neil Danns, footballer
- Mark Womack, actor
