= Frank Gatliff =

Australian actor (1927–1990)

- Born: Frank Ernest Gatliff; 31 December 1927; Melbourne, Australia
- Died: 23 June 1990 (aged 62); London, England
- Occupation: Actor

Frank Ernest Gatliff (31 December 1927 – 23 June 1990) was an Australian actor based in Great Britain. He appeared in several films (notably as Bluejay in The Ipcress File) but mostly on TV, in such series as Gideon's Way, The Baron, Danger Man, The Avengers, Department S, Strange Report, The Persuaders!, Doctor Who (in the serial The Monster of Peladon), Rising Damp, The Good Life, The Onedin Line, Blake's 7, Minder and C.A.B..

== Partial filmography ==
- Captain Carvallo (1958)
- On the Beach (1959) - Radio Officer (uncredited)
- Crooks Anonymous (1962) - Policeman in Park
- A Prize of Arms (1962) - Maj. Palmer
- Bitter Harvest (1963) - Police Surgeon (uncredited)
- The Ipcress File (1965) - Bluejay
- The Projected Man (1966) - Dr. Wilson
- Some Girls Do (1969) - Man Sitting Behind Pilot (uncredited)
- Hark at Barker (1969-1970) - Badger - the butler
- His Lordship Entertains (1972) - Badger - the butler
- The Zoo Robbery (1973) - Smythe
- Operation Daybreak (1975) - Surgeon
- The Four Feathers (1978) - Old Major
- The Prisoner of Zenda (1979) - Casino Servant (uncredited)
- The Bunker (1981) - Ernst-Günther Schenck
- Déjà Vu (1985) - William Tanner (1984)
- Nemesis (1987) - Jason Rafiel
