= Six Dates with Barker =

1971 British TV comedy series

- Six Dates With Barker
- Starring: Ronnie Barker; Christopher Timothy; Valentine Dyall; Lesley-Anne Down; Michael Bates; Freddie Jones; Michael Hordern
- Country of origin: United Kingdom
- No. of episodes: 6

Production
- Running time: 25 minutes
- Production company: London Weekend

Original release
- Network: ITV
- Release: 8 January – 12 February 1971

Six Dates with Barker is a series of six one-off, half-hour situation comedies showcasing the talents of Ronnie Barker. All were broadcast by London Weekend Television early in 1971.

Writers on the series included John Cleese and Spike Milligan. The producer was Humphrey Barclay.

== Episode list ==
1. "1937: The Removals Person"
  - Transmitted 8 January 1971
  - Barker plays Fred, a short-sighted removals man who works whilst the owner of the house watches The Coronation. Also starring Joan Benham, Gillian Fairchild, Nan Braunton, Josephine Tewson and Christopher Timothy. Written by Hugh Leonard.
2. "1899: The Phantom Raspberry Blower of Old London Town"
  - Transmitted 15 January 1971
  - A mysterious figure who blows raspberries at people terrifies Victorian London. Also starring Alan Curtis, Moira Foot, Larry Noble, Christine Ozanne and John Sharp. Written by Spike Milligan.
3. "1970: The Odd Job"
  - Transmitted 22 January 1971
  - When his wife leaves him, Barker hires a passing odd job man to kill him when he least expects it. When his wife returns he finds his previous request impossible to cancel. Also starring David Jason, Joan Sims, Derek Ware, Larry Martyn and George Waring. Written by Bernard McKenna. This episode was videotaped in black and white owing to the 1971 ITV Colour Strike. In 1978 this episode was remade as a feature length film with Graham Chapman taking Barker's role and David Jason reprising his role as the odd job man.
4. "1915: Lola"
  - Transmitted 29 January 1971
  - A top female agent goes missing after the German Head of Espionage fails to monitor her properly. Also starring Graham Armitage, Valentine Dyall, Freddie Earlle, Freddie Jones, Dennis Ramsden, Peter Stephens and Hugh Walters. Written by Ken Hoare and Mike Sharland.
5. "1971: Come in and Lie Down"
  - Transmitted 5 February 1971
  - Barker plays Dr Swanton, a psychiatrist who is visited by a patient (Michael Bates), who is so terrified of being diagnosed with mental problems, he pretends to be a gasman. Written by John Cleese.
6. "2774 AD: All the World's a Stooge"
  - Transmitted 12 February 1971
  - In the far future, comedy has become the religion of the world and there are dire consequences for those who do not join in. Also starring Lesley-Anne Down, Joyce Grant, Michael Hordern and Victor Maddern. Based on an outline by Gerald Wiley (Barker's pseudonym) and Maurice Murphy.

== Spin-offs ==
There were several spin-offs to come from this series.

- "The Phantom Raspberry Blower of Old London Town" was turned into a serial for the 1976 series of The Two Ronnies, David Jason performed the required 'Raspberrys' blown by the Phantom (but did not appear on screen). Actor David Rowlands appeared as The Phantom in the penultimate instalment.
- "The Odd Job Man" became a 1978 film, retitled The Odd Job. Extended from the original TV version to feature length. Though this time, original co-writer Graham Chapman took Barker's part, Diana Quick took the part of his wife, originally played by Joan Sims. David Jason as the hitman was the sole original cast member in this movie (though even his part was at first going to be played by Keith Moon).
- "The Removals Person" was turned into Ronnie Barker's final TV series Clarence, seventeen years after the original was made. This time the series was written by Barker using the pseudonym Bob Ferris. This was the name of Rodney Bewes' character in BBC sitcom The Likely Lads, and the name was in tribute to writers Dick Clement and Ian La Frenais. Josephine Tewson reprised her role as Barker's co-star.

== Archive status and DVD release ==
Unlike many television programmes of the time, all six shows exist in the archives. They have been released by Network DVD, both as a single-disc individual release and together with Hark at Barker as The Ronnie Barker Collection.

== See also ==
- Seven of One
