= The Riddle of the Third Mile =

1983 novel by Colin Dexter

- Cover of the first edition
- Author: Colin Dexter
- Cover artist: Chris Brown
- Language: English
- Series: Inspector Morse series, #6
- Genre: crime novel
- Publisher: Macmillan
- Publication date: 27 October 1983
- Publication place: United Kingdom
- Media type: Print (Hardcover)
- Pages: 224p.
- ISBN: 0-333-35812-0
- OCLC: 59092912
- Preceded by: The Dead of Jericho
- Followed by: The Secret of Annexe 3

The Riddle of the Third Mile is a crime novel by Colin Dexter, the sixth novel in Inspector Morse series.

== Plot summary ==
The novel is divided into three books – the first mile, the second mile and the third mile. The title is a reference to the biblical sentence "And whosoever shall compel thee to go a mile, go with him twain" as in St Matthew, Chapter Five, Verse Forty-One. The third mile could also indirectly refer to a particularly elaborate scheme used in the book to lure three of the college staff to London.

=== The First mile ===
There are three main narratives in this book.

During the Second World War, there are three brothers Albert, Alfred and John Gilbert serving as tank drivers in the army. Albert and Alfred are identical twins. The youngest brother is assumed to have been trapped in his tank during an offensive and burnt to death. One of the elder brothers is present yet unable to help due to a direct order from the lieutenant Browne-Smith. The brothers develop a hatred towards Browne-Smith, (mistakenly) believing that his cowardice caused their brother's death.

At the present time Browne-Smith is a professor at Oxford. He departs on a mysterious trip to London, where he visits a topless bar and then proceeds to a brothel. There he is served drugged drinks and collapses on the bed.

A few days later the Master of Lonsdale College invites Morse to lunch and voices suspicion about the disappearance of Browne-Smith. He has left the college without any communication or forwarding address. Morse promises to keep an eye out for any information that comes his way. It is revealed that Morse was a student of Browne-Smith in his college days and the reason Morse picked up his obsession with grammar and spelling. We also see a short flashback into Morse's days in Oxford and his breakup with his lover.

Then a dismembered corpse is fished out of the Oxford Canal at Thrupp. The corpse is missing the head, hands and legs. This makes identification difficult, but Morse believes that the corpse could be that of Browne-Smith. It is also found that Browne-Smith was suffering from a brain tumour and had only a few more weeks left to live.

== = The Second Mile ==
As more evidence accumulates suspicion seems to fall on the don Westerby, who was antagonistic towards Browne-Smith at Lonsdale College and is supposedly on holiday in Greece after his recent retirement. But Morse speculates that the body is not that of Browne-Smith but probably Westerby, thereby the need to dismember the corpse to confuse the police.

During a visit to Browne-Smith's room at the college, Morse meets one of the Gilbert twins, who is running a removals business engaged to shift the retired Westerby's effects. Morse gains the address of Westerby's new flat in London from the Gilbert twin. On travelling there, he finds another corpse, this time stabbed with a screwdriver. In a moment of forgivable lapse brought about by his fear of corpses, Morse does not recognise the murderer and allows him to walk free.

The second mile concludes with three more deaths – one murder, one suicide and one from natural causes, leaving none of the suspects alive.

=== The Third Mile ===
Morse largely guesses how things happened. His theory goes as follows: the Gilbert twins wanted to kill Browne-Smith in order to avenge the death of John Gilbert and set up an elaborate scheme to lure him to London. He tells them that John actually committed suicide so they let him go. Browne-Smith in turn uses the same scheme to lure Westerby and confronts him before realising that he was mistaken in his antagonism. He has always assumed (wrongly) that Westerby had voted against him in the election for Master of the college. Westerby and Browne-Smith both realise that the current Master had voted against both of them in their previous elections. So they use the same scheme for the third time to lure the Master to London and kill him. Browne-Smith was, however, guilt-ridden and tried to steer Morse to the culprits. It is suggested that he was mentally unbalanced – a side-effect of the tumour.

Morse further guesses that the corpse found in Thrupp was that of the Master. Westerby killed Alfred in his London flat and in turn Albert killed Westerby and then committed suicide. Browne-Smith died of his tumour.

== Characters ==
- Albert Gilbert: He is one of the Gilbert twins. He is described as the quick-witted and resourceful of the two. He kills Westerby and commits suicide on learning that his wife has left him.
- Alfred Gilbert: He is the second twin and is killed by Westerby.
- Professor Browne-Smith: He is a don at Lonsdale College and suffering from a terminal brain tumour. He was a former Lieutenant and the Gilbert brothers served under him in WWII. Like Morse, he is obsessed with grammar and spelling.
- Professor Westerby: Another professor at Lonsdale, who dislikes Browne-Smith as he thinks that Browne-Smith voted against him in the election for the Master's seat. He used his car to dump the first corpse into the canal at Thrupp.
- Master of Lonsdale: While never mentioned by name, he is finally revealed to be a dubious character. He voted against Smith and later Westerby thereby voting them out of the race for the Mastership. He is also said to be involved in inappropriate dealings about examination results.

== Adaptations ==
Although the narratives differ, this novel provided the inspiration for the Inspector Morse television episode The Last Enemy, the second episode of series 3, aired in 1989. The episode guest stars Barry Foster as Sir Alexander Reece, Michael Aldridge as Arthur Drysdale and Tenniel Evans as Doctor David Kerridge, three characters who combine aspects of Browne-Smith, Westerby, the Gilbert twins and the Master. Reece is the Master of the College who involves Morse in Kerridge's disappearance. Drysdale is the one with the brain tumour and a former army officer from the war. Drysdale and Kerridge both blame the other for their failure to be granted an important position, when Reece was responsible. Drysdale lures Kerridge into a trap and tries to strangle him but spares him on learning the truth. Reece kills Kerridge and is then himself killed by the dying Drysdale. The initial dismembered corpse is that of a man Drysdale killed for an affair with his late wife.

== Publication history ==
- 1983, London: Macmillan ISBN 0-333-35812-0, Pub date 27 October 1983, Hardback
- 1984, New York: St. Martin's Press ISBN 0-312-68228-X, Pub date February 1984, Hardback
