= The Secret of Annexe 3 =

1986 novel by Colin Dexter

- Cover of the first edition
- Author: Colin Dexter
- Cover artist: Martin White
- Language: English
- Series: Inspector Morse series, #7
- Genre: crime novel
- Publisher: Macmillan
- Publication date: October 1986
- Publication place: United Kingdom
- Media type: Print (Hardcover)
- Pages: 224
- ISBN: 0-333-43139-1
- OCLC: 59097956
- Preceded by: The Riddle of the Third Mile
- Followed by: The Wench Is Dead

The Secret of Annexe 3 is a crime novel by Colin Dexter, the seventh novel in Inspector Morse series.

== Plot ==
The plot centres on the Haworth Hotel, in Banbury Road, Oxford, owned and run by John Binyon, a football pools winner, with the assistance of his wife, Catherine, and a manageress, Sarah Jonstone. The hotel consists of two buildings: a Victorian house that Binyon had bought ten years earlier, and its neighbour, known as the "annexe", bought more recently and still undergoing conversion, with only four rooms currently in use as hotel accommodation. For the third year running the hotel is hosting a three-day New Year "bonanza", including, on New Year's Eve, a fancy dress dinner party (this year on the theme of The Mystery of the East), and on New Year's Day a treasure hunt. There are 38 guests and the fancy-dress competition is won by a man named Mr Ballard, wearing Rastafarian costume, with dreadlocks and stage-black makeup.

On the following afternoon, New Year's Day, Ballard is found dead and mutilated in his room, Annexe 3 (i.e. Room 3 in the annexe). Inspector Morse, assisted by Sergeant Lewis, is assigned the case. They begin to investigate the background to the guests who had been staying at the hotel – most of whom have already left at the earliest possible opportunity. One immediately suspicious circumstance is that Annexe 3, occupied by Ballard and his wife, had been booked by post by Mrs Ballard, writing from an address in Chipping Norton that proves not to exist, and Mrs Ballard herself has now vanished. Morse's enquiries also focus on the other guests who had been staying in the annexe – Mr and Mrs Palmer and Mr and Mrs Smith – as the snow on the surrounding ground is undisturbed, suggesting that no-one else had entered or left the building overnight. In due course it is established that Mrs Palmer is a high-class prostitute who had occupied a room with a client and the Smiths, initially suspected of being an unmarried couple using an alias, are actually fraudsters who regularly check in to hotels and leave without paying. These deceits complicate Morse's enquiries but are eventually dismissed as red herrings.

The Ballards' fake address suggests that a postal worker may have been involved in the matter and leads Morse to the name of Tom Bowman, a postman from Chipping Norton, who now appears to be missing. The corpse proves to be Bowman. His wife, Margaret, gives a preliminary interview to Morse and Lewis but subsequently disappears. Evidence emerges that she had been engaged in an extramarital affair, and Morse manages to identify her lover as Edward Wilkins, a crane driver. He theorises that Bowman learned of his wife's infidelity and hatched a plot whereby Wilkins would be lured to an assignment with Margaret at the Haworth Hotel, where Bowman would kill him; but that Margaret tipped Wilkins off and that consequently it was Bowman who was killed. Morse surmises that, in order to throw confusion on the time of death, and to provide himself and his wife with a partial alibi, Bowman had arranged matters so that both he and Wilkins would be dressed in similar Rastafarian costumes and that Wilkins, having killed Bowman in the early evening, had taken advantage of this fact by attending the party and winning the competition in the guise of "Mr Ballard".

Wilkins is questioned but turns out to have a strong alibi for New Year's Eve: he plays tenor sax in a jazz band that was performing at another pub. Morse eventually works out that the winner of the fancy-dress competition had been a genuine Rastafarian, Winston Grant, a black musician, who had been hired by Wilkins to pose as "Mr Ballard" in order to strengthen Wilkins' alibi. Wilkins, aided by Margaret Bowman, had indeed been the murderer. Wilkins is taken into custody from an airliner at Gatwick Airport as it is about to take off. Margaret, however, evades justice. She was on the same aircraft but avoided the attention of the police and so has escaped to Barcelona.

== Adaptations ==
Although the narratives differ, this novel provided the inspiration for the Inspector Morse television episode The Secret of Bay 5B, the last episode of series 3, aired in 1989. It guest stars Mel Martin as Rosemary Henderson (the rough equivalent of Margaret Bowman), Philip McGough as Brian Pierce (the rough equivalent of Winston Grant) and George Irving as George Henderson (the rough equivalent of Thomas Bowman). The corpse is found in a car in a multi storey rather than in a hotel annexe, and a number of complications are added to the plot, with Rosemary having two lovers, one of whom kills the other and her husband, and a subplot of Pierce being involved in art fraud. Whereas the book has Margaret escaping justice, Rosemary is arrested with her accomplice at the end.

== Publication history ==
- 1986, London: Macmillan ISBN 0-333-43139-1, Pub date October 1986, Hardback
- 1987, New York: St. Martin's Press ISBN 0-312-01089-3, Pub date November 1987, Hardback
