= Do Not Adjust Your Set =

British television series

- Starring: Denise Coffey; Eric Idle; David Jason; Terry Jones; Michael Palin; Bonzo Dog Doo-Dah Band
- Country of origin: United Kingdom
- Original language: English
- No. of series: 2
- No. of episodes: 29

Production
- Executive producers: Humphrey Barclay (series 1); Ian Davidson (series 2)
- Production locations: Wembley Studios (Series 1); Teddington Studios (Series 2)
- Running time: c. 25 minutes (excluding commercials)
- Production companies: Rediffusion London (Series 1); Thames Television (Series 2)

Original release
- Network: ITV
- Release: 26 December 1967 – 14 May 1969

Related
- At Last the 1948 Show (1967)

Do Not Adjust Your Set is a British television series produced originally by Rediffusion, London, and then by the fledgling Thames Television for British commercial television channel ITV from 26 December 1967 to 14 May 1969. The show took its name from the message (frequently seen on the TV screen in those days) that was displayed when there was a problem with transmission or technical difficulties.

It helped launch the careers of Denise Coffey, David Jason, Eric Idle, Terry Jones and Michael Palin; the last three became members of the Monty Python comedy troupe soon afterwards. Although originally conceived as a children's programme, it quickly acquired a following amongst adults, including future Python members John Cleese and Graham Chapman.

The Bonzo Dog Doo-Dah Band, a satirical comedy/art/pop group, also performed songs in each programme and frequently appeared as extras in sketches. The programme itself comprised a series of satirical sketches, often presented in a surreal, absurd and discontinuous style – anticipating Monty Python's Flying Circus, which began five months after the last episode of Do Not Adjust Your Set. Several surreal animations between sketches were crafted for the second series by Terry Gilliam, who soon graduated to Python along with Palin, Jones and Idle.

One recurring feature of the show was Captain Fantastic, a superhero parody featuring David Jason in farcical and morbid adventures against villainess Mrs. Black (Coffey). These segments were shot entirely on location in London. The feature was so popular with the young audience that after Do Not Adjust Your Set itself ended, Captain Fantastic briefly continued in its own capacity in the children's magazine show Magpie.

Only 14 of the original 29 episodes currently exist.

== Awards ==
In June 1968, an episode of Do Not Adjust Your Set was submitted to the 1968 Prix Jeunesse International Television Festival in Munich. It won first prize in the 12–15 years category.

== Home media ==
Nine of the 14 episodes from the first (Rediffusion) series were released on DVD in the UK and the US on 25 August 2005. Both releases use the same NTSC Region 0 discs made from telerecordings of the original videotapes. In this DVD release, the episodes are numbered 1 to 9, although, in fact, they are episodes 2, 3, 6, 7, 10, 11, 12, 13, and 14 from series 1 (a similar fault was made on the release of At Last the 1948 Show). The sole surviving episode from series 2 and Do Not Adjust Your Stocking were not included. Contrary to claims on the packaging, Terry Gilliam's animations also do not appear on this release, although Gilliam does appear as one of the additional writers in the credits for episodes 3 and 4. The Bonzo Dog Doo Dah Band was seen playing their song "Death Cab for Cutie" (also performed in the Beatles' film Magical Mystery Tour) on the DVD in episode 7.

On 16 September 2019, the British Film Institute released a comprehensive DVD set of the surviving videos and animations from both series. It includes the previously missing fourth episode of the first series, which was rediscovered (but only after the earlier DVD release) when it was noticed that a copy had been sent to the jury of the Prix de Jeunesse award. This edition survives as a domestic recording on a Phillips 1500 cassette made by Thames Television in 1976, which was discovered by Kaleidoscope in 2015, when a copy was returned from Munich. It is thus the only series 1 episode with magnetic rather than optical sound quality. The BFI release features episodes with their original numbering. They include the Christmas special and some Gilliam animations (restored from his own masters) that appeared in otherwise lost episodes.

== Episodes ==
=== Christmas Special (1967) ===
The very first episode, an introductory special meant for Boxing Day 1967, was accidentally switched with the first regular episode in all regions except for London.

No. overall	No. in series	Title	Archival status	Original release date
1	1	"A Happy Boxing Day and a Preposterous New Year"	Exists	26 December 1967

=== Series 1 (1968) ===
The first series was produced by Rediffusion, thirteen episodes were broadcast from 26 December 1967 to 28 March 1968, on Thursdays at 17:25. Three episodes from this series are currently missing from the archives, nine episodes survive as telerecordings and a further edition (Episode 4) survives on a domestic tape recording. Several cast changes occurred over the course of this series, Tim Brooke-Taylor filled in for Michael Palin for the studio recording for Episode 9, as the latter was having his appendix removed. The following edition, Neil Innes was absent from the taping since he had the flu, so Eric Idle filled in for him when performing the vocals/ piano parts for the Bonzo's musical number 'Love is a Cylindrical Piano'.

No. overall	No. in series	Title	Archival status	Original release date
2	1	"Episode 1"	Exists	4 January 1968
3	2	"Episode 2"	Exists	11 January 1968
4	3	"Episode 3"	Missing	18 January 1968
5	4	"Episode 4"	Exists	25 January 1968
6	5	"Episode 5"	Exists	1 February 1968
7	6	"Episode 6"	Exists	8 February 1968
8	7	"Episode 7"	Missing	15 February 1968
9	8	"Episode 8"	Missing	22 February 1968
10	9	"Episode 9"	Exists	29 February 1968
11	10	"Episode 10"	Exists	7 March 1968
12	11	"Episode 11"	Exists	14 March 1968
13	12	"Episode 12"	Exists	21 March 1968
14	13	"Episode 13"	Exists	28 March 1968

=== Specials (1968) ===
A summer special was broadcast on 29 July 1968. It was the last episode to be produced by Rediffusion, since it was transmitted on their final day of broadcasting before Thames Television took over as the franchise holder for the London region (weekdays only) the following day. The Christmas special was the first episode to be produced by Thames. For a 1986 repeat, David Jason demanded to be removed from the show, thus creating an abridged version of 25 minutes. This edition was also notable for featuring the first animated sketch by Terry Gilliam, who would go on to contribute further material for the subsequent series.

No. overall	No. in series	Title	Archival status	Original release date
15	1	"Special"	Exists	29 July 1968
16	2	"Do Not Adjust Your Stocking"	Exists	25 December 1968

=== Series 2 (1969) ===
The second and final series, thirteen episodes were broadcast from 19 February 1969 to 14 May 1969, on Wednesdays at 17:20. Most of the episodes from this series are currently missing from the archives, although audio recordings survive from several missing episodes Only Episode 2 survives intact; it is also the only episode from the entire series run to exist on its original 2" master videotape. Animated sequences by Gilliam including "Beware of the Elephants" and "Learning to Live with an Elephant" also exist on b&w 35 mm film.

No. overall	No. in series	Title	Archival status	Original release date
17	1	"Episode 1"	Missing	19 February 1969
18	2	"Episode 2"	Exists	26 February 1969
19	3	"Episode 3"	Missing	5 March 1969
20	4	"The Loose Denture Show"	Missing	12 March 1969
21	5	"Your Permanent Wave Looks OK to Me"	Missing	19 March 1969
22	6	"It's Sundown at the Usual Time"	Missing	26 March 1969
23	7	"The Show with Knobs On"	Missing	2 April 1969
24	8	"N.U.T.S."	Missing	9 April 1969
25	9	"The Original Broadway (Ealing) Cast"	Missing	16 April 1969
26	10	"Episode 10"	Missing	23 April 1969
27	11	"The Whizzo-Eazi-Probe"	Missing	30 April 1969
28	12	"The Interplanetary Crossword Puzzlers"	Missing	7 May 1969
29	13	"The Last Post"	Missing	14 May 1969

== Sources ==
- Currie, Tony (2004). A Concise History of British Television 1930–2000. Kelly Publications. p. 64. ISBN 1-903053-17-X.
- Wilmut, Roger (1980). From Fringe to Flying Circus: Celebrating a Unique Generation of Comedy, 1960–1980. Eyre Methuen. p. 183.
