= Alma Cullen =

Screenwriter from the United Kingdom (1938–2021)

- Born: Alma Fitzpatrick; 10 May 1938
- Died: 7 August 2021 (aged 83)
- Occupation(s): Scriptwriter and playwright

Alma Cullen (10 May 1938 – 7 August 2021) was a screenwriter and playwright, creating scripts for well-known British television dramas Inspector Morse and A Touch of Frost.

== Early life ==
Alma Cullen was born in Prescot, Merseyside of working class parents, Frank and Elsie Fitzpatrick. She attended Childwall Valley High School for Girls, leaving school at age 16 to earn money to help support her family. She subsequently attended Liverpool University, studying English and graduating in 1970. While still at university, her first play, A Glimpse into the Interior, was produced by BBC Radio Leeds.

== Career and awards ==
In the 1970s and 1980s Cullen wrote a series of plays for television. The Caledonian Cascade, produced by Granada Television in 1977, featured Rikki Fulton, Richard Wilson, Annie Ross and Iain Cuthbertson. Cullen's STV drama Two Per Cent won the Pharic McLaren award. Her play Off Peak starred well-known actors David Robb, Phyllis Logan, Annette Crosbie and Isla Blair. The play was nominated for a Prix Italia and won the silver medal at the 1984 New York TV Festival. Another STV drama, Northern Lights, was set during an Edinburgh Festival starring Judy Parfitt and Rik Mayall, and was shortlisted for an Emmy. Isla Blair also starred in the STV legal drama series, The Advocates, based in Edinburgh, and she is quoted as saying "[Cullen] is the only writer on television whose dialogues I have never wanted to change. That is very rare."

In the late 1980s and 1990s, Cullen collaborated with author Colin Dexter on four episodes of Inspector Morse, sharing the Writers' Guild award for best original drama in both 1991 and 1992.

In 1996, she wrote the script for an episode of A Touch of Frost, starring David Jason, who later went to win best actor award in 2000 for his role in Cullen's TV film All the King's Men.
