= The Odd Job =

- Directed by: Peter Medak
- Screenplay by: Bernard McKenna; Graham Chapman
- Based on: an original play by Bernard McKenna
- Produced by: Mark Forstater; Graham Chapman
- Starring: Graham Chapman; David Jason; Simon Williams; Diana Quick; Edward Hardwicke; Bill Paterson; Michael Elphick; Stewart Harwood; Carolyn Seymour
- Cinematography: Ken Hodges
- Edited by: Barrie Vince
- Music by: Howard Blake
- Production companies: Charisma Films; Taulorda
- Distributed by: Columbia-EMI-Warner Distributors
- Release date: September 1978
- Running time: 87 minutes
- Country: United Kingdom
- Language: English
- Budget: £500,000

The Odd Job is a 1978 British comedy film starring Monty Python member Graham Chapman.

It has been called "the film Graham Chapman starred in that everyone forgets exists".

== Premise ==
It tells the story of a man named Arthur Harris who is recently abandoned by his wife. He becomes so depressed that he hires an "odd job man" to kill him. Once his wife returns, Harris finds himself unable to cancel the contract.

== Cast ==
- Graham Chapman as Arthur Harris
- David Jason as The Odd Job Man
- Diana Quick as Fiona Harris
- Simon Williams as Tony Sloane
- Edward Hardwicke as Inspector Black
- Bill Paterson as Sergeant Mull
- Michael Elphick as Raymonde
- Stewart Harwood as Bernaard
- Carolyn Seymour as Angie
- Joe Melia as head waiter
- George Innes as caretaker
- James Bree as Mr. Kemp
- Zulema Dene as Mrs. Kemp
- Richard O'Brien as Batch
- Carl Andrews as taxi driver
- Dave Atkins as milkman
- John Judd as police driver
- Nick Edmett as Police Constable
- Toby Salaman as barman
- Tiny Keeling as Boston Startler
- David Hatton as old man
- Anthony Milner as waiter
- Mark Penfold as ambulanceman

== Production ==
Following Monty Python and the Holy Grail the members of Monty Python worked on separate projects. John Cleese made Fawlty Towers, Eric Idle Rutland Weekend Television, Terry Jones and Michael Palin Ripping Yarns, Terry Gilliam Jabberwocky and Graham Chapman The Odd Job.

The concept originated as an episode of the London Weekend Television/ITV series Six Dates with Barker in 1971, written by Bernard McKenna, with Ronnie Barker as Arthur Harris and David Jason as the Odd Job Man (who plays the same role in the feature film). Chapman admired the play and commissioned McKenna to turn it into a feature film script. Chapman raised the budget, which he said was half a million pounds.

The role of the odd job man was originally intended for Chapman's friend Keith Moon.

Finance came in part from members of the rock groups Led Zeppelin and Pink Floyd. Steve O'Rourke, Pink Floyd's manager, was an executive producer; so too was band manager Tony Stratton Smith.

The original director was meant to be Cliff Owen but he broke his thigh and had to be replaced. Peter Medak was selected; it was Medak's first feature since Ghost in the Noonday Sun. Two weeks before filming, Medak went to visit Keith Moon in hospital "drying out" so he would be ready for the film. Medak became convinced that Moon would not be able to finish the movie and pressed for him to be replaced. He wrote, "I knew how much Keith was looking forward to the part in the film: I knew that I was right and they were wrong but should I just wave goodbye to the £50,000 I had already spent or make the film and take a chance on it making money? I chose the latter and still wish I hadn't." (Moon died on 7 September 1978).

The film was shot in early 1978 at Shepperton Studios with location shooting around London.

== Reception ==
The Daily Mirror called it a "plodding farce". The Sunday Telegraph described it as "no good". The Observer wrote "this unhappy film is like a stale Whitehall farce brought to the screen by Pearl and Dean; I've seen funnier advertisements for Indian restaurants."

The film failed to find distribution in the US because distributors thought it was "too English". This prompted Medak to relocate to the US.

Chapman and McKenna later collaborated again on Yellowbeard.

== Notes ==
- Chapman, Graham (1980). A liar's autobiography, volume VII. Eyre Methuen. ISBN 978-0-413-47570-1.
