= The Phantom Raspberry Blower of Old London Town =

Television sketch written by Spike Milligan

Title card: The Two Ronnies, 1976

The Phantom Raspberry Blower of Old London Town is a 1971 episode of LWT's Six Dates with Barker that was written by Spike Milligan and later adapted by Ronnie Barker for The Two Ronnies sketch show in 1976. Set in Victorian London, it featured a Jack the Ripper–style madman who stalked the streets and killed or stunned his victims by blowing them a raspberry.

The title was preceded by the words "Chopper Films Presents", a parody of Hammer Films, and the writing of the serial was credited to "Spike Milligan and a gentleman". The "Gentleman" listed as the co-writer was Gerald Wiley, the pseudonym used by Ronnie Barker as a comedy writer. The story was originally conceived as a TV special for Peter Sellers, Harry Secombe, and Spike Milligan, to be produced by Peter Eton, their old Goon Show producer. Plans for the project were cancelled due to Peter Sellers' Hollywood commitments. The Phantom finally saw the light of day in an episode of Six Dates with Barker, broadcast on 15 January 1971, with Alan Curtis playing the role of the Phantom. Despite some sources claiming that Milligan provided the raspberry of the title, it was actually Barker's co-star from Open All Hours, David Jason, who was responsible for this sound effect - Jason confirmed this in his 2013 autobiography. One episode featured Ronnie Corbett as the diminutive yet domineering Queen Victoria and Barker as her browbeaten son "Edward, Prince of Wales" (in reality he was known as "Bertie" to his family, a diminutive of his name "Albert Edward"), which was a parody of the recent TV series Edward the Seventh starring Timothy West.

A stage version ran at the St. James Theatre in London from 30 October to 1 November 2015, with the premiere in aid of The Princes Trust. It was adapted by Lee Moone, with the addition of comedy songs. The format was as a live radio show, complete with sound effects. Each evening a different mystery guest was cast as the Phantom and could be heard offstage until the reveal in the closing scenes. The guests were Jon Culshaw, John Challis and Danny Baker. The director was Dirk Maggs.

A newly adapted stage play, celebrating the 50th anniversary of the 1976 original broadcast, tours in Autumn 2026. It stars Daniel Grooms, Callum Hale, John Hewer (who also wrote the adaptation) and Della Maylan, and is directed by Rachael Hewer.
