= Clarence (British TV series) =

1988 BBC sitcom with Ronnie Barker

- Genre: Sitcom
- Created by: Ronnie Barker
- Written by: Ronnie Barker (as Bob Ferris)
- Starring: Ronnie Barker; Josephine Tewson
- Opening theme: "(Keep Your) Sunny Side Up"
- Country of origin: United Kingdom
- No. of episodes: 6

Production
- Running time: 30 minutes per episode

Original release
- Network: BBC2
- Release: 4 January – 8 February 1988

Clarence is a 1988 BBC sitcom starring Ronnie Barker and Josephine Tewson, written by Ronnie Barker under the pseudonym "Bob Ferris" as an acknowledgement to Dick Clement and Ian La Frenais, creators of Porridge and the sitcom character Bob Ferris. It was Barker's final sitcom appearance before his retirement.

Barker stars as Clarence Sale, a short-sighted furniture shifter. The series was inspired by "The Removals Person" by Hugh Leonard, an episode in the 1971 LWT comedy anthology series, Six Dates With Barker. The pilot episode has the same plot and a very similar script, even to the extent of Tewson reprising her earlier role. The only significant difference is that in "The Removals Person" Barker's character is named Fred.

Only one series of Clarence was made, which is now available on DVD. The series is also available in Region 4 Australia with the same cover art. The house of the family that Jane Travers works for, which inspired the opening titles, is located on Malvern Road in Cheltenham.

== Plot ==
In 1937, on the day of King George VI's coronation, Clarence Sale, a myopic removal man is clearing the house of a snooty upper-class lady who is moving abroad. There, he meets Jane Travers, her maid. The pair are mutually attracted and soon Clarence proposes to her. Jane decides that they should have a trial period of living together in a small cottage she has been given in an inheritance to see if they are compatible, with a bolster in the bed to preserve her chastity. The series followed this unconventional relationship, as well as Clarence's attempts at his furniture-moving profession.

== Cast ==
Clarence region 2 DVD cover

- Ronnie Barker as Clarence Sale
- Josephine Tewson as Jane Travers
- Phyllida Law as Mrs Vaile (Ep. 1)
- Julia Deakin as Angela (Ep. 1)
- Richard Caldicot as Cinema Manager (Ep. 2)
- Gwen Nelson as Mrs Titheridge (Ep. 6)
- Damaris Hayman as Lady in Loo (Ep. 6)

== DVD releases ==
In Australia, Region 4, the series was released on 9 August 2006. It was then re-released as "The Complete Series" on 20 August 2014.

== Episodes ==
No.	Title	Directed by	Written by	Original release date
1	Episode 1	Mike Stephens	Bob Ferris	4 January 1988
It's Coronation Day 1937 and Clarence meets maid Travers while he moves her employers home. It could be love at first sight if, of course, he could see her properly. Guest starring Phyllida Law and Julia Deakin
2	Episode 2	Mike Stephens	Bob Ferris	11 January 1988
Travers holds back on accepting Clarence's proposal until she is sure she can live with him. So the couple decide to move to the Oxfordshire countryside and begin a trial-run. Guest starring Richard Caldicot.
3	Episode 3	Mike Stephens	Bob Ferris	18 January 1988
In the Oxfordshire countryside Clarence returns to his moving profession working for the vicar's wife.
4	Episode 4	Mike Stephens	Bob Ferris	25 January 1988
Travers believes looking after chickens will help her decide whether Clarence is husband material. Of course he has to build the run first.
5	Episode 5	Mike Stephens	Bob Ferris	1 February 1988
Not many people are moving in the countryside so Clarence has to find other work.
6	Episode 6	Mike Stephens	Bob Ferris	8 February 1988
Travers continues to evade Clarence's proposals and money continues to be tight. The couple find work at a big house in the village. Guest starring Gwen Nelson and Damaris Hayman.
