= Morse's Greatest Mystery =

First edition

Morse's Greatest Mystery and Other Stories is a book by Colin Dexter. First published in 1993, it is a collection of eleven short stories, six of which feature Inspector Morse. In 1996, Dexter received a Macavity Award for Best Mystery Short Story for "Evans Tries an O-Level". The collection was also published under the title As Good as Gold in 1994 as a special paperback edition, commissioned by Kodak.

== Contents ==
- "As Good as Gold" (Morse)
- "Morse's Greatest Mystery" (Morse)
- "Evans Tries an O-Level"
- "Dead as a Dodo" (Morse)
- "At the Lulu-Bar Motel"
- "Neighbourhood Watch" (Morse)
- "A Case of Mis-Identity" (a Sherlock Holmes pastiche)
- "The Inside Story" (Morse)
- "Monty's Revolver"
- "The Carpet-Bagger"
- "Last Call" (Morse)

== Publication history ==
- 1993 London: Macmillan ISBN 0-333-59690-0, Pub date 5 November 1993, Hardcover; without "As Good as Gold"
- 1994 London: Pan Books ISBN 0-330-33475-1, Pub date 4 March 1994, Paperback; without "As Good as Gold"
- 1994 London: Macmillan ISBN 0-333-62773-3, Pub date 2 December 1994, Paperback, 240p.; without "As Good as Gold"
- 1994 London: Pan, Pub date 1994, Paperback, 282p.; as As Good as Gold, special edition, commissioned by Kodak
- 1995 London: Pan Books ISBN 0-330-34025-5, Pub date 7 April 1995, Paperback
- 1995 New York : Crown Publishers ISBN 0-517-79992-8, Pub date 14 November 1995, Hardcover; First US edition
- 1996 New York: Fawcett ISBN 0-8041-1309-2, Pub date 2 November 1996, Paperback
- 1998 London: Pan Books ISBN 0-330-37642-X, Pub date 1998, Paperback; Promotional edition which only includes "Morse's Greatest Mystery", "Evans Tries an O-Level", "Dead as a Dodo", "At the Lulu Bar Motel", "Neignbourhood Watch" and "A Case of Mis-Identity".
