= All the King's Men (1999 film) =

- Based on: The Vanished Battalion by Nigel McCrery
- Written by: Alma Cullen
- Directed by: Julian Jarrold
- Starring: David Jason; Maggie Smith; David Troughton
- Music by: Adrian Johnston
- Country of origin: United Kingdom
- Original language: English

Production
- Producers: Gareth Neame; Nigel McCrery
- Cinematography: David Odd
- Editor: Chris Gill
- Running time: 109 minutes

Original release
- Network: BBC
- Release: 14 November 1999

All the King's Men is a British World War I television drama by the BBC starring David Jason, first broadcast on Remembrance Sunday, 14 November 1999. The film derives its title from a line in the Humpty Dumpty nursery rhyme and is based on a 1992 book, The Vanished Battalion by the film's co-producer, Nigel McCrery.

== Book ==
The drama was based on co-producer Nigel McCrery's non-fiction book The Vanished Battalion. The book was first published in 1992 and was republished in 1997 and 1999 as All the King's Men: one of the greatest mysteries of the First World War finally solved.

== Plot ==
The film and book are based on the story of the 1/5th (Territorial) Battalion of the Norfolk Regiment which included men from the King's estate at Sandringham House who had initially been formed in a "Sandringham Company".

The battalion suffered heavy losses in action at Gallipoli on 12 August 1915 and a myth grew up later that the unit had advanced into a mist and simply disappeared. The film dramatises these events and the origins of the myth back home, in the process following an investigator sent after the war on behalf of the royal family to find the truth about the company's fate. As represented in the film, after becoming separated from other British troops and suffering heavy losses the remnants of the former Sandringham Company were taken prisoner by Ottoman soldiers and then massacred. One survivor wakes in a German military hospital and is told by a doctor that he was fortunate to have been found by German troops accompanying the Turkish forces.

The scene in which prisoners are killed as they tried to surrender was criticised by both the Turkish Ambassador in London, and by a grandson of the central character, Captain Frank Beck, as being unsupported by evidence.

=== Background to claimed massacre ===
The book itself only hints at the possibility that a proportion of those who died were "executed" after being captured. The Reverend Pierrepoint Edwards, who discovered the mass grave, was reported to have revealed, much later, in a private conversation that the bodies he had found had been shot in the head. The veracity of that claim has remained unproven, the suggestion being made in the film that it was not revealed at the time to protect the feelings of the King and Queen, and relatives of the deceased. There is stronger evidence though in the form of the account of one survivor, Private Arthur Webber of the Yarmouth Company, taken prisoner during the battle. He was wounded to the head and claimed to have both heard other wounded being bayonetted and shot by Turkish soldiers, and to have been attacked in the same fashion himself, only being saved by a German officer. In addition, at least one British officer was seen being taken prisoner during the battle but was not heard from again. The book suggests that, based on evidence from the time, the Turkish soldiers struggled with the concept of taking prisoners as opposed to a deliberate execution policy.

The film does go beyond the book in the way it portrays a larger group of men taken prisoner being deliberately executed, in a confused and fast-moving scene. From the accounts of the time, as related in the original book, it would seem that far from being tamely slaughtered as prisoners, most of the men who died did so in heavy fighting, either being killed outright or dying from the wounds suffered. The unit had advanced beyond other British troops in the line and found themselves isolated some distance behind Turkish lines. Ultimately, a group of anything up to 200 men had been surrounded at a farm house and wiped out during the fighting. As to the fate of Captain Beck, who is shown among the prisoners being executed, the film makes assumptions as well. The last sighting of Beck was by one of the survivors, who saw him slumped under a tree some time before the end of the battle, with his head to one side. The survivor could not be sure that he was not already dead at that point.

== Production ==
Filming took place at Sandringham and Holkham Hall, on the North Norfolk Railway and elsewhere in Norfolk, with Andalucia in Spain serving as Gallipoli.

== Reception ==
David Jason won Best Actor in the TV Quick Awards for his performance.

The rendition of the Norfolk dialect in the film was criticised by the Friends of Norfolk Dialect, formed to preserve and promote the proper recreation of it; "All the King's Men from Sandringham assembled proudly, then marched into the same old murky Mummerzet waters."

== Cast ==
=== Principals ===
- David Jason – Captain Frank Beck – the Sandringham estate manager
- Maggie Smith – Queen Alexandra
- David Troughton – King George V
- William Ash – Sergeant Ted Grimes

=== Other ===
- Sonya Walger – Lady Frances
- Stuart Bunce – 2nd Lt. Frederick Radley
- James Murray – Pte. Will Needham
- Ed Waters – Cpl Herbert Batterbee
- Tom Burke – Private Chad Batterbee
- Ben Crompton – Private Davy Croft
- Eamon Boland – Arthur Beck
- Jo Stone-Fewings – Lt. Alec Beck
- James Hillier – 2nd Lt. Evelyn Beck
- Emma Cunniffe – Peggy Batterbee
- Adam Kotz – Oswald Yeoman
- Patrick Malahide – Capt. Claude Howlett
- Gaye Brown – Queen Mary
- Phyllis Logan – Mary Beck
- Ian McDiarmid – Rev. Pierrepoint Edwards
- Danny Worters – Private George Dacre
- Laurence Dobiesz – Luke Grimes
- Roland Oliver – Mr Adams
- Jamie Beddard – Roland Adams
- Daisy Gough – Princess Mary

== Crew ==
- Ruth Maturuas – associate producer
- Nigel McCrery – co-producer
- Rebecca Eaton, Hilary Salmon, Jane Tranter – executive producers
- Casting by Maureen Duff and Gail Stevens
