= Moira Foot =

English actress (born 1953)

- Born: Moira Foot; 19 June 1953 (age 72); Northampton, England
- Occupation: Actress
- Years active: 1969–1988

Moira Foot (born 19 June 1953) is an English actress. She starred in 'Allo 'Allo!, playing Denise Laroque, the leader of the local communist resistance. She also played Miss Thorpe, Mr Rumbold's temporary secretary, in three episodes of Are You Being Served?. Other series in which she appeared include Hark at Barker, Six Dates with Barker, His Lordship Entertains, On the Buses, Oh Happy Band!, Maggie and Her, Doctor at Large, Quiller, and The Benny Hill Show. In 1977 she appeared in the episode Angels of Death in The New Avengers. Her film credits include roles in One Brief Summer (1970), On the Buses (1971), and The Strange Case of the End of Civilization as We Know It (1977).

Moira Foot is the daughter of Alistair Foot, co-writer (with Anthony Marriott) of the long-running farce No Sex Please, We're British.

== Filmography ==
- 'Allo 'Allo
- Oh Happy Band
- The Dick Emery Show
- Maggie and Her
- The Strange Case of the End of Civilization as We Know It
- The New Avengers
- The Benny Hill Show
- Quiller (TV Series)
- Whodunnit? (TV Series)
- Are You Being Served? (TV Series)
- The Life of Riley (TV Series)
- Late Night Drama (TV Series)
- Men of Affairs (TV Series)
- Billy Liar (TV Series)
- His Lordship Entertains (TV Series)
- Bachelor Father (TV Series)
- On the Buses
- Doctor at Large (TV Series)
- Six Dates with Barker (TV Series)
- Hark at Barker (TV Series)
- One Brief Summer
