= TV's 50 Greatest Stars =

British television awards show

TV's 50 Greatest Stars was a one-off British television awards show which invited the viewing public to vote for their favourite on-screen stars from a list compiled by the broadcaster ITV. Fifty actors, actresses, presenters and comedians, both alive and dead, were featured on the list, the number 50 being chosen to coincide with ITV's fiftieth birthday celebrations in September 2005 (although technically, there were 55 individuals on the list, due to partnerships such as The Two Ronnies and Richard and Judy being counted as one entry).

The two-hour show, directed by Mark Robinson, was hosted by Coronation Street actor Bradley Walsh, who ran through the stars in reverse order. The order was determined by the public, who could vote, either online or in the TV Times, for five (no more and no fewer) of their favourite celebrities. Members of the public could also nominate other television celebrities who had not been included on the list.

Actor David Jason won, with Morecambe and Wise and John Thaw coming in second and third place respectively; the majority of nominees were comedians, a fifth were deceased and men outnumbered women by almost five to one. Walsh was quoted as saying "I'm delighted to be involved in this show. It will be a great celebration of some of the most fantastic stars from the last 50 years. It will be interesting to see who the viewers vote to come out on top." The show was narrated by Mel Giedroyc.

== Results ==
The results of the public vote for TV's 50 Greatest Stars
Rank	Name	Description
1	David Jason	Actor; well known for several roles including Open All Hours, Derek "Del Boy" Trotter in the BBC comedy series Only Fools and Horses, and Detective Inspector Jack Frost in the ITV crime drama A Touch of Frost.
2	Morecambe and Wise	Comic double act; worked in variety, radio, film but especially famous for The Morecambe and Wise Show.
3	John Thaw	Actor; appeared in many television programmes including Redcap, The Sweeney, Home to Roost, Kavanagh QC but most notably the titular role in Inspector Morse.
4	Julie Walters	Actress; has won multiple BAFTAs and other awards for her work in a large number of films and TV shows including Billy Elliot, Harry Potter and Educating Rita.
5	Bruce Forsyth	Presenter and entertainer; the current holder of the world record for the longest television career for a male entertainer, known for on The Generation Game, Play Your Cards Right, The Price Is Right and Strictly Come Dancing amongst others.
6	The Two Ronnies	A comedy duo; known primarily for their sketch show The Two Ronnies.
7	Ant & Dec	Comedy and presenting duo; host such shows as I'm a Celebrity...Get Me Out of Here!, Saturday Night Takeaway and Britain's Got Talent.
8	David Attenborough	Naturalist and broadcaster; best known for his nine Life series of nature documentaries.
9	Stephen Fry	Comedian, presenter and actor; host of QI and half of the comic double act Fry and Laurie amongst many other things.
10	Victoria Wood	Comedian, actress; notable for Victoria Wood: As Seen on TV, Housewife, 49 and Dinnerladies amongst other works.
11	Robbie Coltrane	Actor and comedian; starred in the television series Cracker and received the British Academy Television Award for Best Actor in three consecutive years (1994 to 1996), and film appearances include roles in Harry Potter and James Bond.
12	Peter Kay	Comedian; the current world record holder for the most successful comedy tour.
13	French and Saunders	Comic double act; their eponymous television show consisted of spoofs and satire of popular culture, films, celebrities and art.
14	Michael Palin	Comedian, actor and presenter; known primarily for Monty Python (appearing in some of the most famous sketches), Ripping Yarns amongst other things.
15	Tommy Cooper	Comedian and magician who specialised in prop comedy, a member of the Magic Circle, also famous for his trademark red fez.
16	Billy Connolly	Comedian, actor; has appeared in a wide range of television shows. His films include Garfield: A Tail of Two Kitties, The Man Who Sued God, and The X-Files: I Want to Believe.
17	Benny Hill	Comedian, actor; most notable for his long-running television show The Benny Hill Show.
18	Lenny Henry	Comedian, actor and presenter; co-founded charity Comic Relief.
19	Jeremy Clarkson	Broadcaster; best known for presenting motoring show Top Gear.
20	Michael Parkinson	Broadcaster; known most for his long-running talk show Parkinson; The Guardian described him as "the great British talkshow host".
21	Terry Wogan	Broadcaster; had the most listened to radio show in Europe (Wake Up to Wogan), but has also presented Children in Need and a chat show Wogan.
22	Tony Hancock	Comedian, actor; had the popular comedy show Hancock's Half Hour amongst other things.
23	David Frost	Comedian, host and personality; hosted That Was the Week That Was, Frost Over the World, Breakfast with Frost and Through the Keyhole.
24	Bob Monkhouse	Comedian, actor, host; presented many different shows including The National Lottery, The Bob Monkhouse Show and Family Fortunes.
25	Rolf Harris	Comedian, entertainer/television personality; presented shows such as Animal Hospital and Rolf's Cartoon Club.
26	Noel Edmonds	Presenter; has presented a wide range of television shows from Top of the Pops, Top Gear, Juke Box Jury, The Late, Late Breakfast Show, The Noel Edmonds Saturday Roadshow, Telly Addicts and Noel's House Party.
27	Joanna Lumley	Actress, voice-over artist; has appeared in a range of films from The Wolf of Wall Street to On Her Majesty's Secret Service and James and the Giant Peach.
28	Simon Cowell	Reality television judge; a talent judge on Pop Idol, The X Factor and Britain's Got Talent.
29	Helen Mirren	Actress; has won many accolades for her work in television and films, such as Prime Suspect (receiving three consecutive British Academy Television Awards for Best Actress between 1992 and 1994), and The Madness of King George and The Queen.
30	Ricky Gervais	Comedian, actor; known for The Office, Derek and The Ricky Gervais Show amongst many other things.
31	Trevor McDonald	Newsreader, journalist; famous for ITV News at Ten and Tonight with Trevor McDonald.
32	Les Dawson	Comedian; remembered for his deadpan style and jokes about his mother-in-law and wife.
33	Martin Clunes	Actor; known mostly for his roles in Doc Martin and Men Behaving Badly.
34	Jamie Oliver	Celebrity chef; known for many shows which promote healthy eating and attempting to combat child obesity through his work on school dinners.
35	Robson Green	Actor, presenter; known for Soldier Soldier, Casualty and Wire in the Blood.
36	Cilla Black	Broadcaster; has presented such shows as Blind Date, Surprise Surprise and The Moment of Truth.
37	Caroline Quentin	Actress; known for her work on Men Behaving Badly, Jonathan Creek and presenting Restoration Home amongst other projects.
38	Chris Tarrant	Broadcaster; best known for presenting Who Wants to Be a Millionaire? between 1998 and 2014.
39	Peter Cook	Actor, comedian; a satirist who specialised in anti-establishment comedy.
40	Des Lynam	Broadcaster; has presented mainly (but not exclusively – e.g. Countdown) sport programmes like Grandstand, Match of the Day, Wimbledon, The Grand National, Sportsnight.
41	Leonard Rossiter	Actor, most notable for his roles in comedies Rising Damp and The Fall and Rise of Reginald Perrin.
42	Alan Whicker	Journalist, presenter; known primarily for Whicker's World amongst other projects.
43	Sarah Lancashire	Actress; a regular in Coronation Street, along with roles in films such as Where the Heart Is and in other television shows such as Last Tango in Halifax.
44	Richard and Judy	Presenters; a married couple who have presented both This Morning and later the chat show Richard & Judy.
45	Kenny Everett	Comedian, DJ; best known for his radio work and the television show The Kenny Everett Video Show.
46	Anne Robinson	Presenter, journalist; known mostly for her work on Watchdog and as the acerbic hostess of The Weakest Link where she earned the nickname the "Queen of Mean".
47	Steve Coogan	Actor, comedian; known for his character Alan Partridge which has spawned many television series and a film, but also for his film work such as The Parole Officer.
48	William Roache	Known for the long-term character Ken Barlow in the soap opera Coronation Street.
49	Rory Bremner	Comedian; an impressionist and satirist known for his work on Mock the Week and his sketch show Bremner, Bird and Fortune.
50	Alan Titchmarsh	Broadcaster, gardener; known for his gardening programming such as Gardeners' World and Ground Force, along with presenting other genres of programming such as Songs of Praise.
