= Zulema Dene =

English actress (1934–2022)

- Born: 21 May 1934; Paddington, London, England
- Died: 16 September 2022 (aged 88); London, England
- Education: Royal Central School of Speech and Drama

Zulema Noel Walliker (21 May 1934 – 16 September 2022) was an English actress.

== Life ==
She was an alumnus of the Royal Central School of Speech and Drama. Dene's career included West End productions, such as Tonight at 8.30 by Noël Coward at Lyric Theatre and Motherdear by Royce Ryton at Ambassadors Theatre, television, movies and, in later years, she did voice overs.

== Partial filmography ==
=== Movies ===
- The Odd Job (1978) - Mrs. Kemp
- The Pirates of Penzance (1983) - Pinafore Company
- Playing Away (1987) - Miss Rye
- Willow (1988) - Ethna

=== Television ===
- Emergency-Ward 10 (1965, 1967) - Sister Wright
- Mrs Thursday (1967) (1 episode) - Margaret Lever
- No Hiding Place (1967) (1 episode) - Nurse Brodie
- Dr. Finlay's Casebook (1968–69) (2 episodes) - Mrs. McKay
- Playhouse (1970) (1 episode) - Edwina
- Love Story (1973) (1 episode) - Phylis
- Coronation Street (1973) (3 episodes) - Muriel Chaplin
- The Kids from 47A (1974) (1 episode) - Miss Archibald
- Yanks Go Home (1976–77) (3 episodes) - Marjorie Mortimore
- George and Mildred (1977) (1 episode, "The Right Way to Travel") - Penelope Fordham
- Crown Court (1978) (3 episodes) - Jane Levine
- A Question of Guilt (1980) (7 episodes) - Mrs. Doggett
- Witness for the Prosecution (1982) - Miss Johnson
- The Jewel in the Crown (1984) (1 episode) - Isobel Rankin
- The Brief (1984) (1 episode) - Chairman
- Mapp & Lucia (1986) (1 episode) - Dorothea Cortese
- The Return of Sherlock Holmes (1986) (1 episode) - Theresa Wright
- A Very British Coup (1988) (2 episodes) - The Media - Vision Mixer
- Forever Green (1989) (1 episode) - Mylene
- Mr. Majeika (1990) (2 episodes) - Miss Wotherspoon
- Jeeves and Wooster (1990) (1 episode) - Aneta Cluj
- Coronation Street (1992–93) (8 episodes) - Sarah Brookes
- Love Hurts (1994) (2 episodes) - Olivia Truckle
- Anna Lee (1994) (1 episode) - Mrs. Andrews
- Rebecca (1997) (1 episode) - Tudor Lady
