= Captain Fantastic (TV series) =

Feature of the TV series Do Not Adjust Your Set

Captain Fantastic was a regular feature of television series Do Not Adjust Your Set from 1967 to 1969 which appeared as a filmed insert between the videotaped sketches.

The title character was a bowler-hatted, plastic-mac wearing and umbrella carrying superhero played by David Jason. Denise Coffey also appeared as the villainous Mrs Black.

Each episode was shot on location in and around London. There was no lip sync dialogue, so episodes played like silent movies, narrated by Jason in character over a frenetic piece of library music (Hero V. The Villain by Johnny Pearson). Each week Mrs Black would attempt to take over the world using the electronic gadgetry contained in her "horrible handbag", while Captain Fantastic tried to set things right using his high-tech umbrella.

Each episode ended on a cliffhanger, usually accompanied by a sarcastic comment from the announcer.

During one first series episode of the show, Eric Idle followed the Captain Fantastic segment with the song "Captain Fantastic, We Love You", backed by the Bonzo Dog Doo-Dah Band. The performance featured several of the regular cast members dancing while dressed as superheroes, including Jason who was dressed as Robin. Some years later Jason was to wear a Batman suit in an episode of Only Fools and Horses.

Once the run of Do Not Adjust Your Set finished, the serial was incorporated into Thames Television children's magazine Magpie.
