= The Strange Case of the End of Civilisation as We Know It =

1977 film by Joseph McGrath

- Cover of the US DVD release
- Directed by: Joseph McGrath
- Written by: Jack Hobbs; Joseph McGrath; John Cleese
- Produced by: Humphrey Barclay
- Starring: John Cleese; Arthur Lowe; Ron Moody; Connie Booth; Joss Ackland; Denholm Elliott
- Cinematography: Ken Higgins
- Edited by: Rusty Coppleman
- Music by: Ivor Slaney
- Production company: London Weekend Television
- Distributed by: Independent Television (ITV)
- Release date: 1977
- Running time: 55 minutes
- Country: United Kingdom
- Language: English

The Strange Case of the End of Civilisation as We Know It (also known as The Strange Case of the End of Civilisations) is a 1977 comedy film directed by Joseph McGrath and starring John Cleese, Arthur Lowe, Ron Moody, Connie Booth, Joss Ackland and Denholm Elliott. It was written by Jack Hobbs, McGrath and Cleese.

It is a low-budget spoof of the Sherlock Holmes detective series, as well as the mystery genre in general.

== Plot ==
Aboard a private aircraft, Dr. Gropinger – a parody of Henry Kissinger – is on a goodwill tour of Middle Eastern countries. He misplaces his diary and is thrown into a panic as, without the diary, he no longer knows what country he is about to land in. Stepping off the plane, he extends greetings in Hebrew to a congregation of Arabs and is shot dead. Soon after, the U.S. President (a caricature of Gerald Ford) receives a threatening letter claiming responsibility for the death, signed "Moriarty", who claims to have set in motion a plan that will allow him to rule the world. The president dispatches a top agent to London to work with the world's top law enforcement officials and find a strategy to combat Moriarty.

Headed by an incompetent Englishman, the committee settles on contacting Arthur Sherlock Holmes, an eccentric private detective with an affinity for certain addictive drugs (a nod to the literary Sherlock Holmes' experience with cocaine). Holmes is entrusted by the Commissioner of Police to find the descendant of Moriarty before he gains control of the world, accompanied by the descendant of Dr. Watson, who is both a medical doctor and utter fool. The commissioner is murdered while trying to leave, his death mainly the result of Watson's rampant stupidity.

The duo then proceed to Scotland Yard to discuss the situation with the committee. Before any plans can be made, most of the committee members are murdered by a sniper. Without their help, Holmes concocts a plan to invite the world's great detectives to a party, with the hope of laying a trap for Moriarty, who will be unable to pass up a chance at attacking all of them at once. Many fictional detectives attend, including Sam Spade, Columbo, and Hercule Poirot, all of whom are dispatched while Holmes and Watson do a crossword. The murderer is revealed to be an exact doppelgänger of Watson, leading to great confusion when Holmes cannot determine who is the real Watson, particularly when Watson himself is too stupid to know which is which.

After some clever deduction, Holmes discovers who the real Watson is, and the doppelgänger is revealed to be Moriarty's grandchild, who is in fact Holmes' landlady Mrs. Hudson. Holding Holmes and Watson at gunpoint, she tells them of her long-simmering plan to avenge her grandfather's death by destroying civilization. She shoots Dr. Watson and proceeds to riddle Holmes with (an impossible number of) bullets, which he survives, revealing he suspected her all along and so asked Watson to load her gun with blanks. As Holmes gloats, Watson sheepishly tells him that he forgot to switch the bullets; Holmes realizes he's been shot for real, and dies.

After the end credits run, a narrator teases the possibility of a second programme, asking if Holmes and Watson will die, and Moriarty will destroy the world. A voice replies "yes," and the first narrator says "oh."

== Cast ==
- John Cleese as Arthur Sherlock Holmes
- Arthur Lowe as Dr. William Watson, M.D.
- Ron Moody as Dr. Henry Gropinger
- Holly Palance as air hostess
- Joss Ackland as the President of the United States
- Val Pringle as black CIA man
- Bill Mitchell as "Judas Klein of the FBI"
- Christopher Malcolm as the other CIA man (as Chris Malcolm)
- Gyearbuor Asante as African delegate (as Christopher Asante)
- Denholm Elliott as English delegate
- Nick Tate as 1st Australian
- Josephine Tewson as Miss Hoskins
- Burt Kwouk as "Fo Tong of Peking", Chinese delegate
- Stratford Johns as Chief Commissioner Blocker
- Connie Booth as Mrs. Hudson / Francine Moriarty
- Derek Griffiths as bus conductor
- Billy Hamon as constable at Scotland Yard
- Edmund Pegge as Superintendent McClelland (2nd Australian)
- Robert Kingdom as intercom man
- Maria Charles as tea lady
- Delaney O'Connor as hotel commissionaire
- Moira Foot as receptionist
- Dudley Jones as Hercule Poirot
- Luie Caballero as Columbo
- Kenneth Benda as Sir Miles Messervey, 'M'
- Charlotte Alexandra as Miss Moneypacket
- Maurice Kaufmann as Steve McGarrett
- Mike O'Malley as Sam Spade
- Paul Chapman as McCloud

== Reception ==
The Stage and Television Today called the film "[a] most carefully disciplined, timed and rehearsed romp, making it an outstanding candidate for the truly funniest of the year."

Kenneth Eastaugh, reviewing for The Times, wrote: "It is rarely inspired, except when Cleese and Arthur Lowe are on the screen, and not funny enough even when they are on the screen. But there are some comical take-offs of television's most famous detectives... And it all keeps moving."

== Tie-in book ==
A paperback book containing the script, and many black and white photographs, was published as a Star Book by W.H. Allen in 1977 with illustrations by George Djurkovic.
