= Lucky Feller =

1976 British TV sitcom

- Genre: Sitcom
- Written by: Terence Frisby
- Directed by: Mike Vardy
- Starring: David Jason; Peter Armitage; Cheryl Hall; Pat Heywood
- Country of origin: United Kingdom
- Original language: English
- No. of series: 1
- No. of episodes: 13

Production
- Running time: 25 minutes
- Production company: London Weekend Television

Original release
- Network: ITV
- Release: 3 September – 26 November 1976

Lucky Feller is a British television sitcom written by Terence Frisby and produced by Humphrey Barclay. It was broadcast on ITV in 1976. The series stars David Jason and ran for one series of 13 episodes.

The series is about two plumber brothers who live in Brockley, South East London. The basic set-up can be compared to Only Fools and Horses, except with David Jason playing the Rodney part, Bernard 'Shorty' Mepstead. The elder brother, Randolph 'Randy' Mepstead, is played by Peter Armitage (Nicky Henson in the pilot episode). Shorty is naive, hopeful and in love with a girl named Kathleen Peake (Cheryl Hall). She is sexually infatuated with – and thinks she is pregnant by – Randy. Despite her attraction to Randy, she becomes engaged to Shorty and has to bed him before the end of the series so that he will believe that he is the father. But despite her best attempts, and Shorty's feelings for her, the consummation never happens. In the final episode, it becomes clear that Kath is not pregnant.

Guest stars include Pat Heywood, Prunella Scales and Mike Grady as well as Burt Kwouk and Saeed Jaffrey. The show was directed by both Gerry Mill and Mike Vardy and location sequences were mainly filmed in and around South London. The show was offered a second series, but writer Terence Frisby did not feel he had enough ideas for the series to continue, so the show ended with the thirteenth episode.

The complete series was released on DVD on 22 September 2014 and was repeated on Gold in 2017, 2018 and 2019. Rewind TV started showing the series from May 2025.

== Episodes ==
No.	Title	Directed by	Written by	Original release date
–	Pilot	Bryan Izzard	Terence Frisby	3 June 1975 (recorded on)
Shorty goes on a date with Kathleen Peake to a Chinese restaurant. They are interrupted by his brother Randy and Randy's drunken friend Sylveste. Randy takes Kath home before returning to the house. This episode has the same story as episode 2, but with a different actress as Mum.
1	"Mother's Day"	Gerry Mill	Terence Frisby	3 September 1976
It is Mother's Day, so Shorty has arranged for his mother, his brother Randy and himself to take a trip to Brighton. Their train breaks down en route. The brothers are attracted to Kath, a young woman with whom they are sharing their compartment. She lives in Nunhead and is visiting her grandmother who lives in Redhill.
2	"All the Tea in China"	Gerry Mill	Terence Frisby	10 September 1976
Shy Shorty plucks up courage to ask his new-found girlfriend Kath out for the evening to a Chinese restaurant. Randy and his friend Sylveste arrive unexpectedly. Randy takes Kath to her place whilst Shorty drives Sylveste home because he is incapacitated by alcohol. When both brothers are back at the house, Shorty thinks that Randy did him a favour by taking Kath home.
3	"Breaking the Ice"	Gerry Mill	Terence Frisby	17 September 1976
Shorty loses his nerve about asking Kath out for a second time. Mum persuades him to ask Kath home for an evening; he accidentally freezes a bottle of champagne which he had intended to drink with Kath.
4	"Kath's Family"	Mike Vardy	Terence Frisby	24 September 1976
Shorty dresses smartly and goes round to Kath's. Her unhappily married parents - Mr and Mrs Peake - are rowing – this time about a broken pane of glass. Shorty offers to mend it. He accidentally breaks the new pane of glass that the Peakes had, so he buys and fits a new window.
5	"It's a Dog's Life"	Gerry Mill	Terence Frisby	1 October 1976
Shorty declares the news: he is in love. Randy is in hysterics, then shocked when Shorty reveals the identity of his infatuation. A trip to the pub is called for.
6	"The Game"	Gerry Mill	Terence Frisby	8 October 1976
Shorty plans to ask Kath out but when he mentions that Randy is at home, that is where they end up for the evening. Kath has some games in mind – but not the one Shorty suggests.
7	"The Power and the Glory"	Mike Vardy	Terence Frisby	15 October 1976
The local church needs some of its wiring repaired and Kath suggests to the vicar that Shorty and Randy should do it. When Shorty learns that Kath got them the job and she is waiting for them in the church, he decides that this is the moment and plucks up courage to propose to her. She receives an electric shock, and he mistakes her shaking for nodding in acceptance.
8	"The Families Meet"	Mike Vardy	Terence Frisby	22 October 1976
In high excitement, Shorty has asked Kath and her parents to Sunday dinner. He plans to announce his intention to marry her. She is puzzled at his claim that she accepted his proposal.
9	"Where There's Life There's Soap"	Mike Vardy	Terence Frisby	29 October 1976
When the machines at the launderette break down and start spewing out soap suds on a Sunday afternoon, Shorty and Randy are hired by the owner to get his 'automated, computerised' system running again. Shorty is horrified and angry when he finds out that Kath is enjoying casual sex with Randy.
10	"Ever Been Had?"	Mike Vardy	Terence Frisby	5 November 1976
The Mepsteads have a night out on the town. Mum goes to bingo, then to a pub where she meets a man whom she brings home. Randy goes on a pub crawl and brings home a woman. At home, Mum's date recognises Randy's date as his wife.
11	"The Boat"	Mike Vardy	Terence Frisby	12 November 1976
Shorty, convinced it is his lack of word power that is preventing him making progress with Kath, is desperate for help. Randy chats up a female stranger in the street, to show Shorty how. Kath tells Mum that she is pregnant by Randolph and the two women conspire to trick Shorty into thinking that he is the father, and Kath now wants to marry Shorty as part of that plan. Kath has not had sex with Shorty, so she tries to find an opportunity to seduce him. Shorty and Kath hire a rowing boat and lay down together in a secluded spot. However, they are soon interrupted by a group of nuns. They get back into the boat, which has a large hole in it and sinks.
12	"A Night on the Moors"	Mike Vardy	Terence Frisby	19 November 1976
Shorty is delighted at Kath agreeing to marry him; he is unaware of her pregnancy. In order to dupe Shorty into thinking that he is the father, she persuades him to take her to Bournemouth for a trial weekend during which she intends to seduce him. However, they take a wrong turn onto Salisbury Plain and stay at a farmer's house. A mix-up regarding who sleeps where results in Kath having sex with the farmer and Shorty having sex with his wife. In the morning, Shorty says something which makes the women realise what happened, but the men still think they each had sex with their own woman.
13	"The Wedding"	Mike Vardy	Terence Frisby	26 November 1976
Now that he is about to marry Kath, Shorty is nervous about the events to come. A rehearsal takes place, but before the actual ceremony, Kath receives a letter advising that she is not pregnant and she decides not to go through with the wedding. When Mr Peake finds out about the pregnancy scare, he wrongly assumes that Kath had sex with Shorty. As Shorty waits in the church for the ceremony, Mr Peake turns up and punches him.
