= Hark at Barker =

1969 British TV comedy series

- Genre: Comedy
- Created by: Alun Owen
- Written by: Peter Caulfield (Alan Ayckbourn); Gerald Wiley (Ronnie Barker); Graeme Garden and Bill Oddie; Bernard McKenna; Eric Idle
- Starring: Ronnie Barker; Josephine Tewson; David Jason; Frank Gatliff
- Theme music composer: John Gregory
- Country of origin: United Kingdom
- Original language: English
- No. of series: 2
- No. of episodes: 15

Production
- Producer: Humphrey Barclay
- Running time: 25 minutes
- Production company: London Weekend Television

Original release
- Network: ITV
- Release: 11 April 1969 – 21 August 1970

Related
- Six Dates with Barker

Hark at Barker is a 1969 British comedy series combining elements of sitcom and sketch show, which starred Ronnie Barker. It was made for the ITV network by London Weekend Television.

Each show began with a spoof news item read by Barker as the announcer. He would then introduce the main part of the programme, a lecture to be given by Lord Rustless (also Barker) on a different topic each week from his stately home, Chrome Hall. Helped and hindered by Rustless' secretary (Mildred) Bates, his Butler Badger, his bad-tempered Cook, his incoherent gardener Dithers and (in Series 2) his buxom, near-mute maid Effie, these lectures invariably degenerated into farce, and were frequently interrupted by comic sketches on location or in the studio which also starred Barker in differing roles.

Barker reprised the role of Lord Rustless in the BBC series His Lordship Entertains, and played very similar characters in Futtock's End and the Two Ronnies specials The Picnic and By the Sea.

== Writers ==
The Chrome Hall sequences were written by "Peter Caulfield" (a pseudonym of Alan Ayckbourn). During the first season, the sketches were written by Barker under his pseudonym "Gerald Wiley", generally with separate sketch contributions from one or both of the team of Graeme Garden and Bill Oddie. (Some of the Garden/Oddie sketches reprised material from I'm Sorry, I'll Read That Again, and another was a forerunner of The Goodies episode "Bunfight at the OK Tea Room"). There were also other occasional sketch contributors during season 1, notably Eric Idle who contributed material to episode 3.

For season 2, sketch material was written by Gerald Wiley and Bernard McKenna.

== Regular cast ==
- Ronnie Barker as Announcer / Lord Rustless / Various sketch characters
- Frank Gatliff as Badger
- Josephine Tewson as Mildred Bates
- David Jason as Dithers / Various sketch characters
- Mary Baxter as Cook
- Moira Foot as Effie the maid (series 2 only)
  - Sketch performers seen across multiple episodes included Jan Rossini and Jo Kendall.
  - Amongst the many other performers who appeared in sketches, seen in one episode apiece were Pauline Yates, Michael Palin, Carol Cleveland, and (in a wordless cameo) Ronnie Corbett.

== Episode guide ==
Series 1 (11 April 1969 – 30 May 1969) – Produced in black and white.

1. "Meet Lord Rustless" 11 April 1969
2. "Rustless And Women" 18 April 1969
3. "Rustless In Pigtails" 25 April 1969
4. "Rustless And A Banquet" 2 May 1969
5. "Rustless And Murder" 9 May 1969
6. "Rustless And Foreigners" 16 May 1969
7. "Rustless And The Solar System" 23 May 1969
8. "Rustless And Relics" 30 May 1969

Series 2 (10 July 1970 – 21 August 1970) as Produced in colour.

1. "Rustless On Music" 10 July 1970
2. "Rustless On Law" 17 July 1970
3. "Rustless On Communications" 24 July 1970
4. "Rustless On Cooking" 31 July 1970
5. "Rustless On Medicine" 7 August 1970
6. "Rustless On Do-It-Yourself" 14 August 1970
7. "Rustless On Sport" 21 August 1970

All Star Comedy Carnival Christmas Special (25 December 1970) as Produced in black and white due to the ITV Colour Strike.

== Archive status and DVD release ==
All episodes exist on their original 2 inch Quad b&w and PAL colour videotapes bar "Rustless on Law" from series 2, which only exists as a 16 mm b/w telerecording. The series was released on Region 2 DVD in 2008 by Network DVD, and are also included in The Ronnie Barker Collection along with Six Dates With Barker.
