= David Jason =

British actor (born 1940)

Sir David Jason OBE
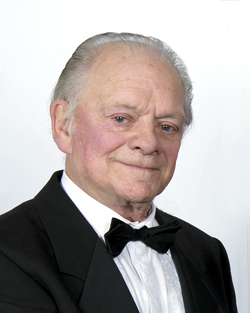
- Jason pictured in 2012
- Born: David John White; 2 February 1940 (age 86); Edmonton, Middlesex, England
- Occupation: Actor
- Years active: 1963–present
- Notable work: Open All Hours; Only Fools and Horses; The Darling Buds of May; A Touch of Frost; Still Open All Hours
- Spouse: Gill Hinchcliffe (m. 2005)
- Partner: Myfanwy Talog (1977–1995; her death)
- Children: 2
- Relatives: Arthur White (brother)

Sir David John White (born 2 February 1940), known professionally as David Jason, is a British actor. He has played Derek "Del Boy" Trotter in the sitcom Only Fools and Horses, Detective Inspector Jack Frost in the drama series A Touch of Frost, Granville in the sitcoms Open All Hours and Still Open All Hours, and Pop Larkin in the comedy drama series The Darling Buds of May, as well as voicing several cartoon characters, including the title characters of Danger Mouse and Count Duckula, Mr. Toad in The Wind in the Willows, and the BFG in the 1989 film of the same name.

In September 2006, Jason topped the poll to find TV's 50 Greatest Stars, as part of ITV's 50th anniversary celebrations. He was knighted in 2005 for services to acting and comedy. Jason has won four British Academy Television Awards (BAFTAs), (1988, 1991, 1997, 2003), four British Comedy Awards (1990, 1992, 1997, 2001) and seven National Television Awards (1996 twice, 1997, 2001 twice, 2002 and 2011).

== Early life ==
Jason's father, Arthur Robert White, was a porter at Billingsgate Fish Market, and his mother, Olwen Jones, was from Merthyr Tydfil, Glamorgan, Wales, and worked as a charwoman. She gave birth to twin boys at North Middlesex Hospital in Edmonton, London, on 2 February 1940, but Jason's twin brother died during childbirth, making him a twinless twin. He chose the stage name Jason because he liked Jason and the Argonauts, as the stage name "David White" was already taken, and not in tribute to his dead twin as has sometimes been claimed.

Jason lived off Lodge Lane, Finchley, and failed his eleven-plus in 1951, and attended Northfield Secondary Modern school. Upon leaving school, Jason wanted to be an actor, influenced by his elder brother (Arthur White), but their father advised that he should first learn a trade. He trained as an electrician for six years, before quitting and became a struggling actor.

Jason's elder brother is the actor Arthur White, born in 1933. The two appeared together in the crime drama A Touch of Frost, with Arthur playing police archivist Ernie Trigg; in 2006, they appeared in Terry Pratchett's Hogfather and again, in 2008, in the comic fantasy The Colour of Magic, in which Arthur played a character called "Rerpf". He also appeared briefly with his brother in two episodes of The Darling Buds of May.

When Jason was 15, he spent a year working as a mechanic's assistant. When he turned 16, he was eligible to register for an apprenticeship, but decided against it.

== Radio and TV career ==
=== Early years ===
Jason started his television career in the made-for-TV film Mother Goose (1965). He played Bert Bradshaw in Crossroads in 1966. In the following year, he played spoof super-hero Captain Fantastic, among other roles, in the children's comedy series Do Not Adjust Your Set (Rediffusion London/ITV) with Eric Idle, Terry Jones, Denise Coffey, and Michael Palin. Humphrey Barclay, who recruited Jason to appear in Do Not Adjust Your Set (partly to counter the more highbrow style of Idle, Jones, and Palin), admired his sense of timing. The programme ended in 1969, and the character then appeared for a time in the Thames Television children's programme Magpie. Jason appeared in the BBC comedy series Hugh and I in 1967, which starred Hugh Lloyd and Terry Scott as two friends who lived together in South London. He appeared in the Randall and Hopkirk (Deceased) episode "That's How Murder Snowballs" (1969) as Abel, a framed performer in a major London theatre.

In 1968, Jason was initially cast in the role of Lance Corporal Jones in the Jimmy Perry and David Croft BBC comedy Dad's Army. Croft had been very impressed with Jason and believed that he had the talent to play a man much older than his real age (though he was only 28 at the time) but BBC executive Bill Cotton overruled him, casting Clive Dunn because he was better known. According to Jason, "I was cast at 12 o'clock and sacked by three." Jason also missed out on the starring role of Frank Spencer in Some Mothers Do 'Ave 'Em in 1973 because BBC executives at the time believed that he lacked "star quality".

In the 1970s, Jason also acted in radio comedies, including the weekly topical satire Week Ending (in which he regularly played such figures as then UK Foreign Secretary David Owen) and The Hitchhiker's Guide to the Galaxy (as the "B Ark Captain" in the sixth episode). Jason also appeared in The Next Programme Follows Almost Immediately and made appearances on panel games such as The Impressionists as well as his own series, The Jason Explanation. In the early 1970s, he appeared in Mostly Monkhouse.

Jason appeared on stage in the West End in the farce No Sex Please, We're British playing Brian Runnicles for 18 months in 1973. He also starred with Valerie Leon in a stage comedy, Darling Mr London, which toured in 1975.

Jason appeared in variety shows as the supporting act of Dick Emery and his performances caught the attention of Ronnie Barker. Jason was recruited to appear in Hark at Barker (LWT, 1969), starring opposite Barker's Lord Rustless, as Dithers, the 100-year old gardener. There was also a sequel, His Lordship Entertains (1972), for the BBC. Jason played idealistic employee Granville in the first programme of the comedy anthology Seven of One (1973), called Open All Hours (BBC) and starring Barker as the curmudgeonly proprietor of a corner shop.

Four series of Open All Hours were made from 1976 to 1985. He featured in Barker's Porridge (BBC), a prison comedy, as the elderly Blanco in three episodes. Jason also appeared with Barker in various disguises in The Two Ronnies, including providing the "raspberry" sound effect for The Phantom Raspberry Blower of Old London Town.

Jason starred in London Weekend Television's Lucky Feller (1975–76), written by Terence Frisby and produced by Humphrey Barclay. About two brothers in south-east London, the series was in many ways a forerunner to Only Fools and Horses. He played the lead role of Peter Barnes in the ATV sitcom A Sharp Intake of Breath (1977–81), alongside Alun Armstrong and Richard Wilson. In 1979, he appeared as Buttons in the pantomime Cinderella at Newcastle's Theatre Royal, starring Leah Bell and Bobby Thompson, produced by Michael Grayson and directed by John Blackmore

In the 80’s he featured in ‘The Chemist’ BBC TVC Studio Play

=== Children's television ===
In the 1980s, Jason developed a working partnership with Cosgrove Hall, and was a voice-over artist for a number of children's television productions. This included voices for Danger Mouse, The BFG, Count Duckula, Hugo from Victor and Hugo, and Toad from The Wind in the Willows, all produced by Cosgrove Hall for Thames Television/ITV. He provided the voice of Father Christmas in Father Christmas and the Missing Reindeer, and Rola Polar in The Adventures of Dawdle the Donkey, Angelmouse, and did voices in animated films including Wombling Free and The Water Babies.

=== Transition into a leading man ===
In 1981, Jason was cast as Del Boy Trotter in the BBC situation comedy Only Fools and Horses, created by John Sullivan. Del is a wide boy who makes a dishonest living in Peckham, south London, trading in broken, stolen, and counterfeit goods. He is assisted by his brother, Rodney (played by Nicholas Lyndhurst), and Grandad (played by Lennard Pearce) and, in later episodes, Uncle Albert (played by Buster Merryfield).

In 1989, Jason starred as Ted Simcock in the ITV drama series A Bit of a Do, which aired from January to December.

In 1999, Jason starred as Captain Frank Beck in BBC's feature-length drama All the King's Men about the Sandringham regiment lost in World War I.

Jason earned acclaim for a string of serious roles. These include Skullion in Porterhouse Blue (for Channel 4), and, from 1991, as Sidney "Pop" Larkin in the rural idyll The Darling Buds of May (Yorkshire Television/ITV), based on the H. E. Bates novel, which also featured Catherine Zeta-Jones.

In 1992, he signed a golden handcuffs deal with ITV to star as Detective Inspector Jack Frost in the long-running TV series A Touch of Frost (Yorkshire Television/ITV). In September 2006, he was voted by the general public as No. 1 in ITV's poll of TV's Greatest Stars. In December 2006, he starred in Terry Pratchett's Hogfather on Sky1 as Albert. In early 2007, he starred in Diamond Geezer (Granada Television/ITV). This series ran for three episodes of 90 minutes each. There was a pilot in 2005. In March 2008, he starred as Rincewind in Terry Pratchett's The Colour of Magic, and in the two-part ITV drama Ghostboat.

On 16 September 2008, Jason announced that he would step down from his role as Jack Frost after 16 years. Three new episodes of the show were shown in autumn 2008, and were followed by a two-part finale in 2010. Approached by BBC One controller Danny Cohen in early 2011, he read three scripts and agreed to shoot a pilot for The Royal Bodyguard, which was shown at the Edinburgh Film Festival. The pilot episode aired on the BBC on Boxing Day but received a poor critical response. The series was cancelled after six episodes. In 2010, Jason starred in a made-for-TV film, Come Rain Come Shine, with Alison Steadman for ITV about an elderly Millwall supporter.

Between 2013 and 2019, he starred in Still Open All Hours. It featured many original cast members (and a portrait of Ronnie Barker as Arkwright) and was written by Roy Clarke, the original writer and creator of the show. He has also starred as Captain Skipper, a sea captain, sea dog and Pip's uncle in the animated series Pip Ahoy!.

In December 2021, Jason made a surprise cameo appearance on the Christmas Special of Strictly Come Dancing in the role of Del Boy to pass on a special message to The Repair Shop's Jay Blades, who was performing to the Only Fools and Horses theme tune.

== Honours ==
In 1993, Jason was made an Officer of the Order of the British Empire (OBE). In the Queen's Birthday Honours List of 2005, he was knighted for services to acting and comedy. Upon receiving the knighthood from Queen Elizabeth II at Buckingham Palace on 1 December 2005, he said he was "humbled" by the "fantastic tribute".

== Personal life ==
Jason lived with his long-term girlfriend, Welsh actress Myfanwy Talog, for 18 years and nursed her through breast cancer until she died in 1995.

On 26 February 2001, Jason became a father at the age of 61 when his girlfriend, 41-year-old Gill Hinchcliffe, gave birth to a girl in Stoke Mandeville Hospital, Aylesbury. Jason and Hinchcliffe married in 2005 and live in Ellesborough, Buckinghamshire.

In 2022, Jason discovered that he had another daughter, of whom he had been previously unaware, who was born in 1970 following a brief relationship with actress Jennifer Hill.

Jason is a patron of the Shark Trust, a United Kingdom registered charity working to advance the worldwide conservation of sharks through science, education, influence and action. He has also been Honorary Vice Patron of the Royal International Air Tattoo since 1999, and on 29 May 2014, presented a cheque on behalf of the Fairford-based RAF Charitable Trust for £125,000 to the RAF Air Cadet Organisation, to fund flight simulators for Air Cadets. He is a qualified helicopter pilot.

Jason was a guest on BBC Radio 4's Desert Island Discs in December 1994. His song choices included "Homeward Bound" by Simon & Garfunkel, "Help!" by the Beatles and "Holding Back the Years" by Simply Red.

Jason has expressed a negative opinion of the European Union (EU), being quoted in a 2012 interview with "the Germans want to run Europe. The irony is that here we are, the world has changed, and the Germans want to run Europe. They failed to do it by war, twice. What is it? Is this the Fourth Reich?"

In October 2013, he released his autobiography called David Jason: My Life. It was shortlisted for the 2013 Specsavers National Book Awards "Best Book of the Year". A second volume, Only Fools and Stories: From Del Boy to Granville, Pop Larkin to Frost, was published in October 2017. Penguin Books announced A Del Of A Life, which is Jason's third autobiography and was published in October 2020.

In September 2017, it was reported that a "credible threat was made to his life", although it is not known why Jason had been targeted. He reportedly increased his security after the threat was made.

== Works ==
=== Books ===
- David Jason: My Life. Random House. 2013. ISBN 978-1448164202.
- Only Fools and Stories. Century. 2017. ISBN 978-1780897950.
- A Del of A Life: Lessons I've Learned. Century. 2020. ISBN 978-1529125115.
- The Twelve Dels of Christmas. Cornerstone. 2022. ISBN 978-1529136142.
- This Time Next Year. Century. 2024. ISBN 978-1529944198.

=== Television ===
Year	Title	Role	Notes
1965	Mother Goose	King Goose	Television film
1966	Softly, Softly	Smith	Episode: "Over Take..."
1966	Crossroads	Bert Bradshaw	18 episodes
1967	Hugh and I	Unknown	Episode: "Chinese Crackers"
1967–1969	Do Not Adjust Your Set	Various	21 episodes
1967–1979	The Dick Emery Show	Unknown	2 episodes
1968	Randall and Hopkirk (Deceased)	Abel	Episode: "That's How Murder Snowballs"
1969	Galton and Simpson Comedy	Gordon	Episode: "Don't Dilly Dally on the Way"
1969	Counterstrike	Taffy Sadler	Episode: "On Ice"
1969	Canada Goose	Unknown	Television film
1969–1970	Hark at Barker	Various characters	11 episodes
1970	Doctor in the House	Mr. Drobnic	Episode: "What Seems to be the Trouble?"
1970	Two D's and a Dog	Dingle Bell	6 episodes
1971	Six Dates With Barker	Clive	Episode: "The Odd Job"
1971	Doctor at Large	Victor Bligh The Toad	2 episodes
1972	His Lordship Entertains	Dithers	7 episodes
1973	Seven of One	Granville	Episode: "Open All Hours"
1974	Doctor at Sea	Manuel Sanchez	Episode: "Go Away Stowaway!"
1974	Comedy Playhouse	Quentin	Episode: "It's Only Me: Whoever I Am"
1974	The Top Secret Life of Edgar Briggs	Edgar Briggs	13 episodes
1975–1976	Lucky Feller	Shorty Mopstead	14 episodes
1975–1977	Porridge	Blanco	3 episodes
1976–1985	Open All Hours	Granville	25 episodes
1977	The Sound of Laughter	Peter Barnes	Episode: "A Sharp Intake of Breath"
1977–1981	A Sharp Intake of Breath	Peter Barnes	22 episodes
1978	The Les Dawson Show	Various	Episode: #1.1
1981–2003	Only Fools and Horses	Derek "Del Boy" Trotter Don Vincenzo Occhetti	64 episodes
1982	Only Fools and Horses: "Christmas Trees"	Derek "Del Boy" Trotter	TV short
1982	The Funny Side of Christmas	Derek "Del Boy" Trotter Granville	Television film
1984	Dramarama	Mr. Stabs	Episode: "Mr. Stabs"
1987	Porterhouse Blue	Skullion	4 episodes
1988	Ariel Liquid (advertisement)	Mrs B	With his co-star, Nicholas Lyndhurst, as Mr H
1989	Jackanory	Storyteller	4 episodes
1989	A Bit of a Do	Ted Simcock	13 episodes
1990	Single Voices	The Chemist	Episode: "The Chemist"
1990	ScreenPlay	George	Episode: "Amongst Barbarians"
1991–1993	The Darling Buds of May	Pop Larkin	20 episodes
1992–2010	A Touch of Frost	DI Jack Frost	42 episodes
1993	Screen One	Billy Mac	Episode: "The Bullion Boys"
1997	Only Fools and Horses: "Only Fools Cutaway"	Derek "Del Boy" Trotter	TV short
1998	March in Windy City	Steven March	Television film
1999	All the King's Men	Captain Frank Beck	Television film
2001–2002	Micawber	Wilkins Micawber	4 episodes
2002	The Quest	Dave	
2004	The Second Quest	Dave	Television film
2004	The Final Quest	Dave	Television film
2005–2007	Diamond Geezer	Des	4 episodes
2006	Ghostboat	Jack Hardy	Television film
2006	Prehistoric Park	Narrator	6 episodes
2006	Terry Pratchett's Hogfather	Alberto Malich	Television film
2008	Terry Pratchett's The Colour of Magic	Rincewind	2 episodes
2009	Albert's Memorial	Harry	Television film
2010	Come Rain Come Shine	Don	Television film
2010	David Jason: The Battle of Britain	Presenter	
2011	David Jason's Greatest Escapes	Himself	
2011–2012	The Royal Bodyguard	Captain Guy Hubble	6 episodes
2013–2019	Still Open All Hours	Granville	41 episodes; A revival of the original series, featuring original cast members Lynda Baron and Maggie Ollerenshaw.
2014	Only Fools and Horses: "Beckham in Peckham"	Derek "Del Boy" Trotter	TV short
2014	Porridge: Inside Out	Narrator	
2017	The Story of Only Fools and Horses	Himself	Six-part documentary series about the sitcom Only Fools and Horses.
2017	David Jason: My Life On Screen	Himself	Three-part documentary series where Sir David Jason embarks on a journey across Britain to explore his career in television.
2017	David Jason's Secret Service	Himself	
2019	David Jason: Planes, Trains and Automobiles	Himself	Five-part documentary series about motor vehicles.
2020	David Jason's Great British Inventions	Himself	Four-part documentary series exploring his favourite British inventions.
2020	Flying For Britain with David Jason	Himself	80th anniversary of the Battle of Britain documentary.
2020	David Jason: Britain's Favourite TV Star	Himself	Channel 5 documentary; a retrospective look at David Jason's career.
2021	The Lancaster Bomber at 80 with David Jason	Narrator	Documentary celebrating the history of the iconic World War II bomber.
2021	Strictly Come Dancing	Derek "Del Boy" Trotter (uncredited)	Episode: "Christmas Special"
2022	Comedy Classics: Porridge	Narrator	
2023	The Apprentice	Derek "Del Boy" Trotter (voice, as Sir David Jason)	Episode: "Cartoons"
2024	David & Jay’s Touring Toolshed	Himself / presenter	With co-presenter Jay Blades
2024	Car SOS	Himself	Episode; Datsun 240K Skyline
2026	Open All Hours: Inside Out	Himself	Open All Hours 50th anniversary documentary

=== Film ===
Year	Title	Role	Notes
1971	Under Milk Wood	Nogood Boyo	
1973	White Cargo	Albert Toddey	
1975	Royal Flash	The Mayor	
1977	Wombling Free	Womble	Voice
1978	The Odd Job	Odd Job Man	
2010	All the Way Up		Director

=== Animation ===
Year	Title	Role	Notes
1978	The Water Babies	Cyril the Walrus	
1981–1992	Danger Mouse	Danger Mouse; Isambard Sinclair (narrator); Buggles Pigeon; Count Duckula; Various characters	90 episodes
1983	The Wind in the Willows	Toad/Chief Weasel	Television film
1984–1990	The Wind in the Willows	Toad/Chief Weasel/Billy Rabbit	48 episodes
1988–1993	Count Duckula	Count Duckula; Various characters	46 episodes
1989	The BFG	The BFG	
1989	A Tale of Two Toads	Toad/Chief Weasel/Isambard Toad/Billy Rabbit	
1991–1999	Victor and Hugo: Bunglers in Crime	Hugo; Interpol; Count Duckula (1 episode); Danger Mouse (1 episode)	30 episodes
1995	The Snow Queen	Eric	
1996	The Adventures of Dawdle the Donkey	Rola Polar	20 episodes
1997	Father Christmas and the Missing Reindeer	Father Christmas	Television film
1999–2000	Angelmouse	All the characters	26 episodes
2005–2018	Little Einsteins	Additional Characters	69 episodes
2005–2018	Doraemon	Additional Voices	947 episodes
2010	Muddle Earth	Randalf	16 episodes
2014–2020	Pip Ahoy!	Skipper; Pasty	22 episodes

=== Radio ===
Year	Title	Role	Notes
Unknown	Mostly Monkhouse	Various characters	
1970–1998	Week Ending	Various characters	
1977–1981	The Jason Explanation	Various characters	
1978	The Hitchhiker's Guide to the Galaxy	Captain of the "B" Ark; Caveman	
2008	Book at Bedtime: A Christmas Carol	Narrator	BBC Radio 4
2016–2017	Desolation Jests		BBC Radio 4

== Awards and nominations ==
Jason won a total of eighteen awards between 1986 and 2011. His hit comedy show Only Fools and Horses won many awards. His crime drama A Touch of Frost has also won and been nominated numerous times. Porterhouse Blue, The Second Quest, All the King's Men and A Bit of a Do have won David Jason one award each.

Year	Group	Award	Film/Show	Result
1985	BAFTA TV Award	Best Light Entertainment Performance	Only Fools and Horses	Nominated
1986	BAFTA TV Award	Best Light Entertainment Performance	Only Fools and Horses	Nominated
1987	BAFTA TV Award	Best Actor	Porterhouse Blue	Won
1988	BAFTA TV Award	Best Light Entertainment Performance	Only Fools and Horses	Nominated
1989	BAFTA TV Award	Best Light Entertainment Performance	Only Fools and Horses	Nominated
1990	British Comedy Award	Best TV Comedy Actor	A Bit of a Do	Won
1990	BAFTA TV Award	Best Light Entertainment Performance	Only Fools and Horses	Won
1992	British Comedy Award	Best TV Comedy Actor	The Darling Buds of May	Won
1996	National Television Award	Most Popular Comedy Performer	Only Fools and Horses	Won
1996	National Television Award	Special Recognition Award	N/a	Won
1996	BAFTA TV Award	Best Comedy Performance	Only Fools and Horses	Won
1997	British Comedy Award	Best TV Comedy Actor	Only Fools and Horses	Won
1997	National Television Award	Most Popular Actor	Only Fools and Horses	Won
1999	National Television Award	Most Popular Actor	A Touch of Frost	Nominated
2000	National Television Award	Most Popular Actor	A Touch of Frost	Nominated
2000	TV Quick Award	Best Actor	A Touch of Frost; All the King's Men	Won
2001	British Comedy Award	Lifetime Achievement Award	N/a	Won
2001	TV Quick Award	Best Actor	A Touch of Frost	Won
2001	National Television Award	Most Popular Actor	A Touch of Frost	Won
2001	National Television Award	Most Popular Comedy Performer	Only Fools and Horses	Won
2002	National Television Award	Most Popular Actor	A Touch of Frost	Won
2002	National Television Award	Most Popular Comedy Performance	Only Fools and Horses	Nominated
2002	TV Quick Award	Best Actor	A Touch of Frost	Won
2003	National Television Award	Most Popular Actor	A Touch of Frost	Nominated
2003	BAFTA TV Award	BAFTA Fellowship	N/a	Won
2003	National Television Award	Most Popular Actor	The Second Quest; A Touch of Frost	Nominated
2011	National Television Award	Outstanding Drama Performance	A Touch of Frost	Won
