= List of A Touch of Frost episodes =

The following is a list of episodes detailing the long-running ITV drama series A Touch of Frost, starring David Jason, John Lyons and Bruce Alexander.

== Series overview ==
Series	Episodes	Originally released	
Series	Episodes	First released	Last released
1	3	6 December 1992	20 December 1992
2	4	9 January 1994	30 January 1994
3	4	8 January 1995	29 January 1995
4	5	7 January 1996	4 February 1996
5	4	9 February 1997	2 March 1997
6	4	7 March 1999	28 March 1999
7	2	25 December 1999	1 January 2000
8	2	14 January 2001	15 January 2001
9	2	27 January 2002	28 January 2002
10	3	19 January 2003	14 September 2003
11	2	26 October 2003	22 February 2004
12	1	25 September 2005	
13	1	5 November 2006	
14	3	12 October 2008	26 October 2008
15	2	4 April 2010	5 April 2010

== Episodes ==
=== Series 1 (1992) ===
No. overall	No. in series	Title	Directed by	Written by	Original release date	UK viewers (millions)
1	1	"Care and Protection"	Don Leaver	Richard Harris	6 December 1992	16.35
No-nonsense detective inspector, Jack Frost, is caring for his terminally ill wife when he is forced to assume command of an investigation into the disappearance of a young girl, Tracy Uphill, aided by DC Clive Barnard, the Chief Constable's nephew. Her mother, Linda, had been late picking up Tracy because she was working as a prostitute. The police search for Tracy uncovers skeletal remains with a locked security box handcuffed to his severed wrist. Later, a conman demands a £2,000 ransom for Tracy's return, which Linda extorts from one of her clients, assistant bank manager Ronald Garwood; the conman is arrested. Tracy is eventually dropped off unsconscious at a hospital, but cat fur leads them to a local cat lady, who had abducted Tracy because she was being abusive towards her, but returned her when she fell ill. Meanwhile, the skeletal remains are discovered to belong to Felton, a bank clerk who disappeared decades earlier with £40,000 stolen from the bank. Garwood is found shot dead by the same gun, leading Frost to the retired bank manager, Gerald Powell. Cornered, Powell explains that he took money from a wealthy customer's account to bail his son out of debt, but the son killed himself when Powell refused to provide even more funds. When the wealthy customer died, Powell had to urgently replace the money, and plotted with Felton—who was blackmailing him—to stage a robbery during a cash transfer, during which the unwitting Garwood would be knocked out. However, Powell forgot the keys to unlock the safebox, and when Felton panicked and attempted to kill Garwood, Powell shot him dead and buried him. The box was empty, as Powell had kept the money in his own safe. Powell killed Garwood to prevent him being questioned and potentially implicating him. As Powell's wife was left mentally broken by her son's death, and completely reliant on Powell, he kills her and himself to avoid arrest. Frost learns that his wife has died while he was working. He reminisces with her nurse, Shirley Fisher, admitting that they grew apart after learning his wife could not have children. She re-focused on living a better life instead, and could not tolerate Jack's slobbiness and lack of ambition, resulting in him spending more time away from home, and eventually starting an affair. Frost was going to leave his wife before learning she had cancer. Dismayed, he got drunk and later subdued an armed criminal, hoping he would be killed, which resulted in him being shot. For his apparent bravery, he received a George Cross medal, finally making his wife proud of him. Based on the book Frost at Christmas.
2	2	"Not with Kindness"	David Reynolds	Richard Harris	13 December 1992	16.45
DI Frost finds himself coping with a shortage of officers, due to an illness circulating the area, and the sudden arrival of his late wife's overbearing sister, as he handles two investigations. The first concerns the murder of a 15-year-old girl, Paula Bartlett, who had disappeared on her newspaper round. Evidence suggests she had sex shortly before her death but it is unclear if it was consensual. After locating her bike and newspaper bag, Frost realises one of the newspapers had been torn by a letterbox and then pulled back out and planted in the bag to conceal Paula's delivery. Suspicion initially falls on her mother's boyfriend, Colin, but Frost soon focuses in on Mike Bell, one of her customers, who often drove her to school after her round ended. Frost discovers Paula's bracelet charm in the back of Bell's car leading him to confess that Paula had come to his home after an argument with her parents, and they had sex. Afterward, he felt guilty and told Paula it was wrong so she threatened to say he assaulted her, and Bell strangled her to death inadvertently while trying to silence her. Later, Frost's temporary partner, DS Sandy Gilmore, realises that Paula's charms were already accounted for, meaning Frost planted a new charm to trick Bell into confessing. The second case concerns, Alex Compton, the wife of a rare books dealer who fears for her life after receiving threatening messages and disturbing packages. She blames a man she met briefly in a bar months earlier, who quickly became obsessed with her. After her husband is killed in an arson attack, Frost claims to have found the suspect deceased and asks Alex to identify him, which she does. Frost reveals the body is completely unrelated to the case, having tricked her into revealing she made the stalker up and killed her husband for his substantial life insurance because he was having an affair. Based on the book Night Frost.
3	3	"Conclusions"	Anthony Simmons	Richard Harris	20 December 1992	N/A
DI Frost is paired with new Scottish secondment DC Webster, an officer who is struggling to fit in with life in Denton, as they investigate three cases: a robbery at a local casino, the hit-and-run of an elderly man by a car belonging to Roger Massie, the son of a local politician, and the murder of a young police officer, Dave Shelby. Frost soon discovers the robbery and hit-and-run are linked. Massie, who was heavily indebted to a local casino, robbed it to use the funds to clear his debt, and had one of his girlfriends drive his car around recklessly to create an alibi for him. Despite his mother's wealth, influence, and efforts to suppress the evidence to protect her image, Frost is able to arrest and charge Massey. The investigation of Shelby's death reveals that he was having multiple affairs and sexually harassed his female colleagues, despite being a husband and father. Webster discovers indecent images of his own wife in Shelby's locker. An on-the-run armed bank robber, Ronnie Eustace, is believed to be responsible. The police corner Eustace, who maintains he did not shoot Shelby, and though Frost nearly talks him down, Webster, observing from a sniper position, shoots Eustace dead. After forensics discovers that Shelby was shot with two different weapons, Frost realises that Webster killed Shelby with his police revolver, and then shot him with a shotgun to conceal it and frame Eustace. Based on part of the plot of the book A Touch of Frost.

=== Series 2 (1994) ===
No. overall	No. in series	Title	Directed by	Written by	Original release date	UK viewers (millions)
4	1	"A Minority of One"	Roger Bamford	Christopher Russell	9 January 1994	12.57
DI Frost investigates a series of commercial robberies assisted by newly promoted Criminal Investigation Department (CID) officer DC Carl Tanner (Lennie James), who is black. Superintended Mullett has promoted Tanner specifically to encourage diversity on the force as local racial tensions are increasing. When Frost makes an arrest, Mullett's only concern is that the culprit being black will further increase the risk of race riots. The white Natalie Bell, Frost's main informant on the significantly diverse Eastdean Estate, is killed when her apartment is set on fire, and Frost believes it was retaliation for her informing him about crimes on the estate by black residents. However, once the autopsy reveals she was beaten before the fire, Frost uncovers that Ritchie Gibbs, the father of Natalie's son, hit her in anger because of the violent people she allowed around his child, and set the fire in an attempt to destroy the evidence. Frost also realises that Natalie was exclusively telling him about and making up crimes by black people, out of spite against the black Gibbs's previous physical abuse. Meanwhile, the robberies are traced to violent white criminal Paul Aspinall, who agrees to inform on the ringleader.
5	2	"Widows and Orphans"	Roy Battersby	Richard Harris	16 January 1994	N/A
DI Frost investigates a series of burglaries directed against old age pensioners, assisted by new female DS Maureen Lawson (Sally Dexter), eventually tying them to non-violent burglar Bernard Elliott. At the same time, things take a serious turn when an elderly woman is badly beaten, eventually dying from her injuries. A second elderly victim is soon found beaten to death, leading to suspicions that a serial killer may be responsible. Frost concludes that the second victim knew her attacker and let them in to her home, and learns from her neighbour that, Ronald Gould, a driver for the bus to her regular bingo game, had offered to replace the broken chain on her door. Frost confronts Gould at his grandmothers home, where she berates Gould for lying and insults his mother, who abandoned him as an infant, causing him to snap and almost bludgeon her. It is revealed that, as a child, Gould was diagnosed as obsessed with the approval of his elders, and despite his outward nice personality, he suffered violent outbursts when upset. Gould targeted his victims due to their age and attitudes, attacking them on and around 26 March, his mother's birthday. Frost is also able to link him to the murder of another elderly woman years earlier. Meanwhile, Frost develops a romantic interest in his late wife's nurse, Shirley Fisher. He admits to her that he stopped talking to his affair partner, Eileen, before his wife died, out of guilt. Based on part of the plot of the book Night Frost.
6	3	"Nothing to Hide"	John Glenister	Richard Harris	23 January 1994	14.91
DI Frost investigates the murder of a young, homeless drug addict, Ben Cornish. Frost works alongside DC Frank Costello (Neil Dudgeon), who was recently demoted and moved to Denton after punching his superior officer, who had taken over Costello's long-worked case at the last minute to receive the credit. Costello is eager to demonstrate his abilities and earn back his rank. Cornish's autopsy reveals he was viciously beaten to near death before choking on his own vomit. Frost soon learns that Cornish had antagonised several people recently: he had stolen from his sister Anne and her husband Ray, again, blackmailed a local doctor for abusing Cornish as a child, and been forcefully evicted from an abandoned house he was squatting in, before threatening revenge. Though Frost's main suspect is the doctor, an offhand comment by a fellow officer reveals that he had arrested Ray for drunken disorder on the night of Cornish's death. Ray confesses that he had run into Cornish and intended to scare him for all the trouble he had caused himself and Anne, but went too far and killed him. Frost later meets his former affair partner, Eileen, to apologise for suddenly ceasing all contact. She admits she truly loved him, but has since moved on due to the pain he caused her. Based on part of the plot of the book A Touch of Frost.
7	4	"Stranger in the House"	Don Leaver	Christopher Russell	30 January 1994	15.77
DI Frost investigates a violent rapist who hides in the homes of his victims, mainly people whose jobs involve them wearing uniforms. He has left his many victims, and their families, traumatised, with one attempting suicide. WPC Hazel Wallace is assigned to support Frost on the case after the rapist unsuccessfully attacks a woman because her colleague at Staunton Towers saw him sneak into her car, and a 17-year-old girl, Alison Cook, goes missing and is presumed to have been abducted by the rapist because an unidentified man was seen in her home. Alison is returned home and it is revealed that she caught her mother having an affair in the home and ran away, and while her dad, Martin, falls under suspicion as he did housework for some of the victims, it is learned that he is impotent and aware of his wife's affair. Frost realises that each victim lived near open areas such as forests, reducing their search area, and arranges a trap with Wallace to draw the rapist out, but Wallace panics when confronted by a masked man. Police trace the masked man to his home and learn he is Gordon Perryman, a night shift guard at Staunton Towers, who has been operating as a burglar. He reveals that he and his partner, Nick Daish, cover for each other so they can perform other tasks instead of working. Frost realises that Daish is the rapist, and learns that he was interested in Wallace. Believing she let the case down, Wallace returns home upset, where she is confronted by the rapist, but successfully incapacitates him just before Frost arrives to help. Unmasked, Daish gleefully admits he took pleasure in taking power away from the women. Meanwhile, Frost invites Shirley Fisher to accompany him to a reunion event in London for all Victoria and George Cross holders, but, distracted by the case, he arrives too late to meet an irate Shirley at the train station, and she returns home. Based on part of the plot of the book A Touch of Frost.

=== Series 3 (1995) ===
No. overall	No. in series	Title	Directed by	Written by	Original release date	UK viewers (millions)
8	1	"Appropriate Adults"	Herbert Wise	Michael Russell	8 January 1995	N/A
DI Frost finds himself clashing with the Denton Police's new DCI, Hawkes (Matthew Marsh), as he tackles two different matters that need investigation. The first concerns the disappearance of 8-year-old Tricia Martin. The last person to see her alive was 19-year-old Billy Conrad—who has Down syndrome and learning disabilities—who is reluctant to say where he was at the time. Billy is well-liked by the local children, but suspicion falls on him after Tricia's body is found in the woods, where Billy had been previously seen. He eventually admits he was visiting his girlfriend, Jane, who also has Down syndrome, at her care home for sex, but hid the truth so they would not be kept apart. Hawkes aggressively interrogates Billy into confessing that he killed Tricia, though Frost remains unconvinced, especially after learning that Tricia was unhappy and had been taken to hospital for severe injuries, supposedly from a fall. To Hawkes' chagrin, Frost uncovers that Tricia's father, Richard (Rupert Holliday-Evans), was physically abusive towards Tricia, and joyriders Frost is also investigating mention seeing someone of Richard's description near the woods. During Richard's interrogation, he confesses that he struck Tricia out of anger and, while fleeing, she fell over and hit her head. Richard attempted to take her to hospital, but realised Tricia was no longer breathing, and hid the body because he could not face admitting what had happened to his wife. Billy is released and goes to visit Jane, but is devastated to see her removed from the home to keep the pair separated. Hawkes suffers another setback when Frost uncovers that Parker (Nick Reding), a policeman on sick leave from another station, is actually just impersonating an officer. He had integrated himself with Hawkes' pool team at a local bar, which in turn had given him access to the station, fulfilling his desire to be a policeman, and creating a serious security breach.
9	2	"Quarry"	Roy Battersby	Christopher Russell	15 January 1995	N/A
DI Frost is struggling emotionally, feeling alone and suffering recurring dreams that upset him. He is reunited with DC Clive Barnard, as he finds himself investigating the murder of Nick Walder, who was struck over the head from behind while assisting a group in sabotaging a fox hunt by wealthy locals. Shortly afterward, the hunt saboteurs' ringleader, Tom Cody, is found dead in a country garbage pile, shot in the chest with a shotgun. Frost learns that Nick was wearing Cody's distinctive blue hat on the day of his murder, leading him to surmise he was accidentally killed by someone targeting Cody. While searching Cody's property, police uncover drums of stolen, high value antiques. Frost finds a stolen car linked to tracks found near Cody's body, and based on witnesses and a keen sense of smell, links the vehicle to Nick's brother Tony. Overcome with despair, Tony confesses that, desperate for money, he accepted a hit job from an unknown person to eliminate Cody, but killed Nick in a case of mistaken identity. He later killed Cody. Art dealer Stephen Milmore, who was present at the hunt, is questioned over Cody and the antiques. When he agrees to meet Barnard to explain, he is run over and killed by a van while Barnard is injured. Frost and Barnard reconcile from an earlier argument, and confront Ruth Ormrod, a wealthy huntress, as Frost recognises the van's description. Ormrod confesses that she used Cody to steal antiques and art to order, some of which Milmore sold, but when she found out that Cody was using some of his gains to fund the anti-hunt groups, she had him killed. She admits she did not conduct her schemes for money, but purely the thrill and challenge of seeing how far she could go. Frost later meets Shirley Fisher, and they begin dating.
10	3	"Dead Male One"	Roger Bamford	Christopher Russell	22 January 1995	N/A
DI Frost tackles the case of Adie Carr, the arrogant and obnoxious star player of Denton football club, who collapsed during a post-match press conference. Tests reveal Carr had a large amount of mesanbuterol in his system, a designer performance enhancing drug, which has caused him severe brain damage and put him in a coma, from which he may never wake. There are several suspects, including a rival footballer who assaulted Carr during the match, and Kirsty Adams, the granddaughter of an elderly man whom Carr and his teammates, Paul Gower and Jamie Todd, conned out of £30,000 to perform unnecessary and unsafe building work on his home. Carr's tribute at the club is vandalised while Gower and Todd are subjected to harassment from an unknown source. After Frost learns that Carr turned down a £250,000 offer to move to another club, hoping to receive an offer from a bigger team, he turns his attention to the club owner, Mike Ross, who is heavily in debt. Ross admits that Carr's decision had ruined him, and he retaliated by drugging Carr's drink, intending for Carr to embarrass himself and be temporarily labelled a drug user, but the dose was too high. Frost sardonically remarks that if Carr does not die in his coma in the next year, they will not be able to charge Ross with murder. Meanwhile, Kirsty's grandfather dies after falling down the poorly built stairs and she attempts to murder Gower in revenge, but Frost tackles her and talks her down; however, he does not have enough evidence to charge Gower or Todd. Frost also investigates the case of the Appendix man, an unidentified body found in a river carrying a driving license belonging to someone else, Colin Drysdale. The investigation leads Frost to learn the man had been in hospital for a burst appendix but disappeared, and the license had been stolen by a prostitute, whom Drysdale was visiting because he finds his wife boring. Frost is unable to conclude the case (the case is reopened in the series 6 episode "Appendix Man"), but feels an affinity to the man, himself feeling alone and unsure if anyone will miss him when he is gone. As a result, Frost decides to put his marital home up for sale, intending to move in with Shirley Fisher.
11	4	"No Refuge"	Don Leaver	Christopher Russell	29 January 1995	N/A
DI Frost is reunited with his former female partner DS Lawson when investigating an armed robbery by three men at the local glassworks, during which an employee is killed and £15,000 in cash is stolen. While pursuing the culprits, Frost notices a suspicious man enter a church, whom he arrests. The glassworks's owner, Bill Boxley (Billy Murray), identifies the man, Stuart Penrice, as one of the culprits. Bill later receives a threatening note warning him to withdraw his statement against Penrice. Bill demands protection from the police, but when he is shot at again while at work, he goes into hiding alone, believing the police are unreliable. His hideout is later burned down and Bill seemingly disappears. Frost and Lawson identify Michael Heathfield, a former glassworks employee, as a suspect, who in turn leads them to the third man, Des Conrad, whom Penrice turns against after learning Conrad was sleeping with his girlfriend. Later, Frost notices that Bill is hiding in a disused part of the glassworks, and tells Bill's son, Kevin, to alleviate his concerns. However, when Conrad admits they lost their shotgun during the robbery, Frost realises that Kevin picked it up and was the one threatening his father. Kevin confronts Bill, venting his frustrations at his father's controlling nature, lack of encouragement, and him seducing the girl to whom Kevin was attracted. Bill apologises for his misdeeds and Kevin surrenders the gun to Frost. Frost and Lawson also investigate a series of robberies at the home of a lesbian couple. They arrest the man, who was secretly living in their loft, but Lawson and the younger partner in the relationship, Liz, develop a romantic attraction. The older partner, Marion, pleads with Lawson to leave their relationship alone, and begs Liz not to go out that night, but when Liz refuses, Marion snaps and stabs her. Though she survives, her relationship with Marion is ended, and as Lawson is linked to the events, Superintendent Mullett forces her to transfer to a station in Cornwall, to Frost's dismay. Meanwhile, Shirley's mother dies and though Frost promises to attend the funeral, he ultimately does not. Upset and disappointed, Shirley confronts Frost about his fear of commitment and truly investing in their partnership, leading him to reluctantly end the relationship, stating Shirley deserves better than him.

=== Series 4 (1996) ===
No. overall	No. in series	Title	Directed by	Written by	Original release date	UK viewers (millions)
12	1	"Paying the Price"	Ross Devenish	Christopher Russell	7 January 1996	16.71
DI Frost accidentally burns down his home while frying food, leaving him temporarily homeless. He remarks that he had struggled to leave the house after his wife's death, but its destruction has forced his hand. Meanwhile, Pauline Venables is abducted after being lured to a remote farm under the pretense of buying a puppy for her sister Sue's birthday. Sue receives a package from a man in a blue bike helmet, with a ransom demand of £30,000 from a group calling themselves the Taskforce. Frost and WPC Claire Toms initially suspect Pauline's boyfriend, Carl Edwards, a former inmate involved in a protection racket, and even Sue, whose husband had an affair with Pauline. However, suspicion shifts to Sue's cleaner, Linda Brook, a naive young woman who works at Bellamy's department store. After Sue demands proof of life, a taped message from Pauline reveals background sounds of a farm, tipping Frost off. Frost confronts Linda at work, prompting her to visit the farm, but Pauline has already been moved. At the farm, Frost discovers a dead dog and evidence linking the site to the abduction. He then finds the blue helmet in the store's locker room and realises there is no Taskforce—the mastermind is Linda's controlling boyfriend, Graham McArdy. Though lacking sufficient evidence for an arrest, Frost pursues McArdy. McArdy relocates Pauline to Hammersley's Warehouse, leaving Linda to watch her. Overcome with guilt, Linda removes Pauline's blindfold and apologises. When McArdy arrives and realises Pauline can now identify him, he kills Linda in a fit of rage. He then moves Pauline to his family's abandoned home and delivers a final ransom demand of £50,000, which Sue pays. Though McArdy retrieves the money and temporarily escapes, documents found at Linda's home reveal his location. Toms tends to a nearly-dead Pauline, while Frost, enraged, tracks down McArdy. After a breakdown, McArdy pleads for mercy and is taken into custody.
13	2	"Unknown Soldiers"	Adrian Shergold	Michael Russell	14 January 1996	16.64
With his house unavailable, DI Frost temporarily moves into a flat above an Indian restaurant. He has a stressful day, first held at gunpoint by young drug dealer Steve Marson, and later learning that soldier John Meredith has been shot dead during a firearms exercise at a local army camp. Major Harvey, the camp's commanding officer, claims it was an accident and tries to block Frost from investigating to avoid any scandal that could hinder his promotion. However, when Captain Carlisle from the Special Investigation Branch takes over, he finds that the bullet was Russian-made, suggesting an external shooter and turning it into a murder case, giving Frost jurisdiction. Frost discovers Meredith was in a secret relationship with fellow soldier Neil Morrison, as homosexuality is a dischargeable offense in the army. Morrison claims that Sergeant Donovan regularly blackmailed homosexual officers. This leads them to Corporal Devenish, who is found with a Russian-made handgun. Devenish confesses to selling Russian weapons to a dealer named Cavendish, who threatened him when he tried to back out. Frost deduces that Cavendish accidentally killed Meredith while aiming for Devenish and also supplied the weapon used by Marson. Frost and Carlisle part on good terms after arresting Donovan for blackmail. Meanwhile, Frost investigates a series of armed robberies targeting Denton Security vans. He learns that the business owner is selling the company and denying redundancy pay to the drivers, including older staff members Les James, Barry Hockey, and Dave Chaplin. Noticing the men are avid fishermen and finding fish scales in the van, Frost deduces that they faked the robberies to cover debts and support their families. Despite understanding their motives, Frost regrets having to prosecute them. By the end of the week, Frost is forced to vacate his flat as the restaurant below loses customers due to the presence of a detective inspector.
14	3	"Fun Times for Swingers"	Peter Smith	Robert Smith	21 January 1996	17.49
Detective Inspector Frost continues to search for temporary accommodation while working with his reserved Scottish partner, Detective Sergeant Prentice. A naked woman jumps to her death from a parking garage, and Frost finds a photograph of an unidentified man in her purse. The man in the photo is later identified as Damien Law, whose beaten body is found in his apartment. Law, a popular gigolo, has numerous women who were obsessively infatuated with him. When Joy Barton reports her husband Frankie missing, Frost connects him to the photograph and realises that Frankie was using the alias Damien while working as a gigolo to raise money for his son's spinal injury treatment. Frost shifts his attention to Barry Curzon, an escort agency owner who had threatened Law and his associate, Harvey, for conducting side work outside his agency. Frost persuades Harvey to provide a list of Law's clients, leading him to Anne-Marie Pearce, the wife of a local philanthropist, Cyril Pearce, who is possessive and controlling. Frost becomes suspicious when he discovers Damien had documents in a secure bank box revealing irregularities in Cyril's charity accounts. Anne-Marie admits to an affair with Damien, explaining she was emotionally drawn to him due to Cyril's impotence and her dissatisfaction with her marriage. Cyril, suspecting the affair, brutally beats Anne-Marie and confesses to accidentally killing Damien during a confrontation, as Damien was blackmailing him over the charity fraud. Cyril later commits suicide by jumping from a bridge, while Frost comforts the injured Anne-Marie. Simultaneously, Frost and Prentice investigate a series of break-ins and acts of vandalism at an exclusive cricket club, where Superintendent Mullett is a committee member. Initially, suspicion falls on Bob Bowker, a former member, but Frost discovers that Mrs. Hastings, the wife of the new club captain, is responsible. She disliked Denton and hoped the damage would prompt her husband to return with her to Oxford. To Frost's delight, he informs a dismayed Mullett that Curzon's alibi in Damien's murder was supported by several prominent club committee members, as Curzon was organising an orgy for them.
15	4	"The Things We Do for Love"	Adrian Shergold	Alma Cullen	28 January 1996	17.45
DI Frost works with his new partner, DS Frank Nash, who has recently transferred to Denton and is struggling to balance the demands of his job with his new marriage. Their main case involves the brutal stabbing of local physiotherapist Vicky Phillips in a car park. Frost is assigned to investigate and learns that Vicky had been scheduled to meet Jonathan Meyerbridge, a prominent figure in the local religious community, who had a past arrest for assault. Other suspects include Sykes, a member of Meyerbridge's religious group who runs a butcher shop near where Vicky's body was found, and Ruth, Meyerbridge's jealous wife. When love letters between Meyerbridge and Vicky are discovered, it becomes clear that they were having an affair and frequently met for secret rendezvous in an apartment above Sykes's shop. Meyerbridge's defense is led by Edward Gull, a solicitor and influential member of the local religious community who also holds a key position on the board managing public and police affairs. Frost suspects Gull has coached the suspects to handle interrogation in a way that would exonerate Meyerbridge and even suspects Gull may have feelings for Meyerbridge himself. Forensics eventually manage to enhance the recorded call made to police alerting them to Vicky's murder. Frost and Nash identify a background sound that matches a radio often carried by the Meyerbridge family's live-in nanny, Milly Atkinson. Milly, who had a troubled past involving crime and abandonment, confesses to killing Vicky after discovering Meyerbridge intended to leave his wife for her. Milly's motive was to prevent him from destroying his family. At the same time, Frost and Nash investigate a series of smash-and-grab robberies in Denton's commercial district, in which the thieves manage to steal large quantities of goods and escape within minutes. After the cases are resolved, Nash confides in Frost that he plans to leave the police force to save his marriage. Frost acknowledges Nash's talent, telling him he has the makings of a good policeman.
16	5	"Deep Waters"	Don Leaver	Christopher Russell	4 February 1996	17.55
Frost finally secures a private residence, although he soon ends up with reformed criminal lodgers. Working alongside WPC Lindsey Hunter (Katrina Levon), Frost investigates an assault on Helen Tudor (Tamzin Malleson), a beautiful and sweet-natured student at Denton University, who was pushed down the stairs following a private tutoring session, and can recall someone asking her not to die there. Suspicion falls on Helen's lecherous and duplicitous tutor, Dr Keith Michaelson (Jonathan Hyde), who uses his position to seduce his female students, but was rebuffed by Helen, and her older truck driver boyfriend, who she learns has a pregnant wife. With help from DS Clive Barnard (Matt Bardock), now based in Boxborough, Frost learns that Paula Tate, a victim who looked similar to Helen and was also an avid swimmer, drowned there 2 years earlier in an apparent suicide. Helen's fellow student, Adam Weston (Damian Lewis), is investigated as he knew Paula. Meanwhile, Helen receives a poem describing her as a flawless mermaid. While observing Weston, Frost notices Weston's friend, Tony Jarvis (Darren Tighe), sneak into the university swimming pool and swim naked. Hunter learns Jarvis spent two weeks studying in Boxborough, and Frost confronts Jarvis's mother, who reveals she witnessed Jarvis drown his younger sister, Simone, of whom he was obsessively jealous, but hid the truth so as to not lose both children. Frost arrives just in time to prevent Jarvis from drowning Helen, while referring to her as Simone. In interrogation, Jarvis claims that he freed Simone and Paula—who he believed were beautiful mermaids—to swim forever, and accidentally caused Helen's fall down the stairs while trying to ensure that Michaelson had not "spoiled" her before he could drown her. Frost simultaneously investigates an armed robbery at a post office which led to the death of the owner's wife, Mrs Chandani. Career criminal Rod Bainbridge (Francis Magee) and his cousin, Peter, are soon arrested, having been seen outside of the post office shortly before the crime, but they refuse to answer any questions and a lack of witnesses to the event means a frustrated Frost must release them. He vows that he will find evidence against them, even if it takes years.

=== Series 5 (1997) ===
No. overall	No. in series	Title	Directed by	Written by	Original release date	UK viewers (millions)
17	1	"Penny for the Guy"	Paul Seed	Malcolm Bradbury	9 February 1997	16.75
DI Frost is forced to cancel his holiday plans to investigate the suspicious death of a young boy, Dean Anderton, on Halloween, working alongside the ambitious DS Liz Maud (Susannah Doyle). The autopsy reveals Dean was chloroformed, had a finger surgically removed, and died from choking on his own vomit. His body was dumped, and another child, Bobby Kirkby, has been kidnapped. The following day, a ransom note is delivered to Sir Richard Cordwell, the wealthy CEO of Cordwell Supermarkets. The kidnapper demands £500,000 from Cordwell, to which he agrees, seeing an opportunity for positive publicity. Cordwell delivers the ransom to a secluded wooded area while Frost and Maud observe. An elderly man, Henry Finch, arrives with his dog and discovers the money bag, but is struck over the head by an unknown assailant who escapes with the money. Frost later learns from an informant that a year earlier, Cordwell Supermarkets had unwittingly accepted £40,000 in counterfeit notes. Unable to deposit them, Cordwell ordered the staff to distribute the fake bills to customers, swearing them to secrecy. Using this information, Frost tracks down the suspect who used the counterfeit notes to buy a car and arrests him. The suspect, however, has an alibi for Bobby's kidnapping and claims Finch fought him for the money, raising Frost's suspicions. Frost discovers Finch is terminally ill and may be enacting a plan with limited time left. A search of Finch's home yields no evidence, but Frost learns Finch is house-sitting for friends. When Frost confronts him, Finch denies involvement in the kidnapping but reveals a motive: Cordwell had fired Finch's wife a year earlier when she tried to report the counterfeit money. Distraught, she took her own life. Frost suggests Finch was not after the ransom and only wanted to hurt Cordwell, but needed a live child for the ransom message, and took Bobby when Dean accidentally died. Frost revisits Finch's friend's house and finds a petrol station receipt in Finch's name, leading him to search nearby Denton Mill, where Bobby is found alive. Although Finch's clever plot leaves no direct evidence linking him to the kidnappings, Frost plants the receipt at the scene, allowing the police to charge Finch. Simultaneously, Frost and Maud investigate the abduction and ransom of teenager Carol Stansfield. It transpires that Carol orchestrated her abduction with her friends to get money from her inattentive father who prioritised her step-mother. Part of the plot is based on the book Hard Frost.
18	2	"House Calls"	Graham Theakston	Malcolm Bradbury	16 February 1997	18.22
DI Frost works with DS Liz Maud to investigate incidents where children have been injected with water using a syringe. Frost connects the incidents to Sydney Snell, an intellectually disabled man who believes he is helping the children. Feeling sympathy for Snell, whom he had previously sent to prison with a promise of psychiatric help that never materialised, Frost releases him. Upset by Frost's leniency, Maud reports him for neglecting his duty. Simultaneously, Frost and Maud investigate the discovery of career criminal Lemmy Hoxton's body, dead for three months. They uncover that Lemmy had been posing as a utility worker to commit robberies and was last seen on his way to the country home of Julie and Caroline, who presented themselves as sisters. Frost and Maud deduce that Lemmy attempted to rape the couple and was killed in self-defense. Fearing exposure of their relationship, Julie and Caroline hid the incident. Meanwhile, carpet fitter Mark Grover returns home from a job at Bonley's department store to find his two infant children dead and his wife, Nancy, missing. Autopsies reveal the children were injected with water after their deaths, making Snell the prime suspect. Superintendent Mullett warns Frost of a likely inquiry into his handling of Snell, and DCI Peters takes over the case. Later, Nancy's body is discovered in a railway tunnel. Though she had a history of depression and suicidal threats, the coroner finds stab wounds that suggest murder, with her body thrown onto a train to stage a suicide. Peters coerces a confession from Snell, who admits to injecting the children but insists they were already dead when he found them, raising Frost's doubts about his involvement. Frost's suspicion shifts to Mark after learning Nancy had recently sought an abortion that was denied due to her mental state. Frost discredits Mark's alibi, discovering that he had been let off Bonley's premises to use leftover carpet remnants in his home. During questioning, a distraught Mark confesses: he and Nancy had argued after he returned home, and Nancy, overwhelmed by depression and her struggles with family life, smothered the children. Enraged, Mark killed her, and his partner, Phil Collard, helped conceal the crime by throwing her off a bridge. Maud tells Frost she is transferring to another station with better career prospects, but apologises for reporting him and they part amicably. Part of the plot is based on the book Hard Frost.
19	3	"True Confessions"	Sandy Johnson	Michael Russell	23 February 1997	17.47
DI Frost investigates after the affluent Jeanette Barr (Yolanda Vázquez) commits suicide by jumping from a bridge into a river. However, the autopsy reveals that the water in her lungs means she was drowned in a bathtub and dumped in the river. Frost's main suspects are her husband, James Barr (Anthony Calf), whom Frost investigated a decade earlier following the murder of his previous wife, Harriet, by an intruder, and Richard Sheridan, an employee at Barr's company, with whom Jeanette was having an affair. Frost and Superintendent Mullett worry that, if Barr killed his second wife, they potentially imprisoned the wrong person for Harriet's murder. Sheridan is given an alibi by his infuriated wife, while Frost meets local priest Fr Sullivan (Eoin McCarthy), who recently heard confession from someone claiming they were going to commit murder. Frost's case is complicated when he is suspended by Detective Superintendent Bailey (Gwyneth Strong) of the Discipline and Complaints department, who is investigating falsified evidence in historic cases worked by Frost's former chief superintendent, Charlie Fairclough (Kenneth Cope). Frost meets Fairclough, who admits he planted evidence to secure convictions, including against Harriet's killer. Frost meets a retired priest who knew James and his brother, Alec, as children: Alec was devoutly religious in his youth, but as his family struggled, Alec became intensely jealous of James, vandalising his possessions, being linked to a pet's death, and obsessing over stealing James's girlfriends. Frost convinces Fairclough to confess his misdeeds to Bailey to close her investigation and have Frost reinstated so he can pursue Alec. Sullivan helps Frost trick Alec into admitting that he murdered Jeanette because James had gifted her his shares in the family business, which she was threatening to sell to a firm pursuing the company's assets, unless Alec paid an exorbitant sum. She lured Alec to a hotel under the pretence of selling the shares and then seduced him, keeping the receipt as blackmail material. When Frost accuses Alec of killing Harriet out of jealousy of his brother, he flees, running into the road, where he is killed by a passing truck.
20	4	"No Other Love"	David Reynolds	Sian Orrells	2 March 1997	18.15
Superintendent Mullett begins assessing staff for redundancies due to budget cuts at the Denton station, and Frost's job is at risk. Meanwhile, DI Frost moves into a new flat, and allows his old partner, DS Clive Barnard, to stay with him while they handle investigations into an armed robbery at Peter Lawson's (Mark Lambert) pawn shop, and a case in which the elderly Olive Walters (Jean Heywood) murdered her husband Harry. Frost learns that Olive's actions were impulsive, the result of decades of emotional abuse from her husband, whom she held responsible for the death of their 2-year-old daughter nearly 40 years earlier, because he refused to let her go to hospital to treat her fever. Olive is released and later dies of natural causes. Frost's investigation into the robbery uncovers Peter's teenage daughter, Rachel, is being sexually abused, and her brother, Matthew, robbed their father for money to fund travel to their elder sister, Joanna (Luisa Bradshaw-White), in Blackpool where Rachel gets an abortion. Rachel and Joanna, who was also abused, are worried that their youngest sister, Suzanne (Ashlie Walker), will soon be targeted. When Peter is murdered, Frost initially suspects the children, but soon uncovers the truth: Peter's domineering father, Charlie (Anthony Bate), killed him to cover up the fact that he had been raping his own granddaughters. When Frost confronts Charlie, he holds Frost at gunpoint, and Clive is killed while protecting him. Charlie then turns the gun on himself. Distraught, Frost tenders his resignation from the force and places his George Cross medal with Clive's body in his coffin, declaring him a true hero.

=== Series 6 (1999) ===
No. overall	No. in series	Title	Directed by	Written by	Original release date	UK viewers (millions)
21	1	"Appendix Man"	Sandy Johnson	Malcolm Bradbury	7 March 1999	16.04
Several months after DI Frost submitted his resignation, Superintendent Mullett has instead placed him on extended compassionate leave, partly because Mullett is in the running to become the new Assistant Chief Constable, and losing Frost could damage his prospects. However, Frost is forced back into active duty when the press questions a wrongful conviction in one of his old cases, the "Black Farm Murders," which also involved the unsolved theft of valuable paintings: Frost concludes the man claiming responsibility for the murders is just seeking attention. At the same time, Hazel Wallace (Caroline Harker) returns to Denton as a Detective Sergeant and is assigned to investigate the suspicious death of art collector Lester Bryce-Jones. She teams up with Frost after it is discovered that Lester had a Hockney painting—one of the stolen works—which has been stolen again. Fingerprints found at the scene match those of "The Appendix Man", an unidentified individual whose body was discovered in a river a year earlier (first seen in the Series 3 episode "Dead Male One"). Frost and Wallace uncover that Lester had multiple aliases and worked as a low-wage hospital porter while secretly selling high-value paintings. They learn that Lester's neighbor, Debbie Viner, had helped him sell the paintings because she needed the money, but he had recently cut her out of the arrangement. When Debbie saw the Hockney painting in his apartment, she went to confront him and found him barely conscious after a risky sexual practice involving alcohol and painkillers. Instead of helping, she let him die and took the painting, only to later discover that it was a forgery. Frost then deduces that the Appendix Man's fingerprints had been tampered with, and they actually belong to Diana, a pathology lab assistant. Diana reveals that the Appendix Man was Ian Priest, a thief and blackmailer who knew both Lester and her brother, David. All three were gay men, and Priest had been extorting David. When Priest's body came to the lab, Diana altered the fingerprints to protect her brother's secret and his career. Frost concludes that Priest had received the stolen Black Farm paintings but, while in the hospital for appendicitis, feared being linked to the case. Lester, working as a hospital porter, helped Priest leave before his surgery, but when Priest collapsed, Lester threw him off a bridge into the river where his body was found. Despite solving three cases, Mullett does not receive the promotion, as senior officers discover that Frost had signed his own expense receipts, which Mullett had unwittingly approved. Frost again offers his resignation, but Mullett declines. Frost returns to his marital home, which has finally been repaired.
22	2	"One Man's Meat"	Alan Dossor	Michael Russell	14 March 1999	14.64
When DI Frost's tenant, PC Tom Haliday is injured, DI Frost is left in charge of his police dog, Kaiser. Frost investigates the suspicious death of Jane Owens, a homeless 16-year-old girl found drowned in the Denton River. Frost discovers that Jane, out of desperation, had considered turning to prostitution but changed her mind and rejected her first client. Angered, the client, identified as married father Alan Deering, brutally beat her. Jane's friend Rickie, who was in love with her, leads Frost to Deering, hoping he will be punished, but admits that Jane, distressed by the assault, her dire situation, and grieving a deceased friend, ultimately took her own life. Without Jane's testimony, Frost is unable to prove Deering beat her and is forced to release him, but vows to pursue kerb crawling charges and ensure the case is covered in the local press to publicly shame him. Frost's second case involves the disappearance of Warren Barber, an environmental health officer who was investigating a local meat processing factory owned by Gerry Ryan. Initially dismissive of the case, the police are pressured to take action by Barber's wife, Naomi. The investigation escalates when a severed arm washes ashore and is identified as Barber's, leading Frost to suspect Barber had uncovered something suspicious at the factory. Frost sneaks into the plant at night and overhears a conversation between Ryan and his accomplice, Jim Scott, revealing that the factory is a front for smuggling drugs from Amsterdam. Barber had broken into the plant after becoming suspicious, but was discovered by Scott, who killed him and disposed of his body by dropping the dismembered parts into the ocean from his Cessna aircraft. Unaware of the murder and feeling remorseful, Ryan threatens to go to the police, prompting Scott to attack him. Frost intervenes, getting wounded in the process, but Kaiser subdues Scott until the police arrive and arrest the ringleaders.
23	3	"Private Lives"	David Reynolds	Russell Gascoigne	21 March 1999	16.85
DI Frost is partnered with DS Billy "Razor" Sharpe, who is temporarily filling in for the ill George Toolan. They are called to investigate a hit-and-run in a small village that leaves charity worker Bryony Darrow in a coma, eventually leading to her death. Frost initially suspects Owen Kimble (Ross Boatman), a retired soldier with post-traumatic stress disorder who often roams the forest where Bryony was found. As Frost digs deeper into Bryony's financial transactions, he becomes suspicious that she was involved in sex work. This is confirmed by a prostitute informant, who reveals that Bryony maintained a flat in London. When Frost visits the flat, he meets Bryony's mother, Marion, who reveals that Bryony's real name was Natalie Williams. Marion, unaware of Bryony's double life, had been living in the flat without asking questions and had no idea about her granddaughter, Rachel (Paloma Baeza). Frost surmises that Bryony's charity work was a front for her sex work. A witness links her last sighting to the car of solicitor Graham Rutherford (Tom Chadbon). When confronted, Rutherford admits that Bryony had been arranging a trust fund for Rachel without her husband Richard's (Peter Egan) knowledge. He also reveals that Rachel is not Richard's biological daughter, though Richard and Bryony had agreed to tell her when she was older. Frost deduces that Rutherford was also one of Bryony's clients. A DNA test confirms that Richard was the last person to have had sex with Bryony, and he eventually confesses. Richard explains that Bryony had left her past behind when they started their relationship, but after finding her with Rutherford, they argued. She told him she planned to leave him and take Rachel. Unable to cope with the betrayal, Richard struck her with his car. After learning about her mother's past and that Richard is not her father, Rachel decides to move to London to meet her grandmother. Meanwhile, Frost and Sharpe are also investigating an armed robbery at a brewery that went wrong because the safe was empty. Frost suspects career criminal Leo Armfield and his accomplice, Garmon, but lacks sufficient evidence to arrest them. When police archivist Ernie Trigg (Arthur White) identifies a pattern in similar robberies, where criminals made a second attempt after failing the first time, Frost sets a trap at the brewery. The plan works, and Armfield and Garmon are caught in the act.
24	4	"Keys to the Car"	Adrian Shergold	Malcolm Bradbury	28 March 1999	15.83
The newly promoted Assistant Chief Constable, Ms. Cremond, takes charge of Denton station while Superintendent Mullett is on leave. She questions DI Frost's methods after he conducts an off-the-record interview with drug dealer Richie Dearne to coerce a confession related to a man left comatose from drugs supplied by Dearne. Dearne's solicitor, Simon Warrinder, files a complaint, leading Cremond to release Dearne and order Frost to cease further contact. Meanwhile, Mullett reports the theft of his golfing partner Ben Pecksmith's red Mercedes from their golf club by a suspect named Harry Plummer, a temporary club member. Plummer checks into a luxury hotel using Pecksmith's identity, where he meets a Dutch woman, Marijka Hoogenbloom. After abandoning the Mercedes, Plummer steals a Range Rover and travels to Holland with Marijka. The abandoned Mercedes is traced to the hotel. When Frost investigates, he discovers Dearne's bludgeoned body in the car's boot along with £5,000 in cash, launching a murder investigation. Marijka is arrested upon her return to the UK, and Plummer (real name Alan Carpenter) is apprehended as well. Frost determines that Carpenter is merely a thief involved in smuggling pornography tapes from Holland and had no involvement in the murder. Marijka, on the other hand, is revealed to be an undercover Dutch drug officer who was at the hotel to meet the real Pecksmith, suspecting his biomedical company of smuggling drugs from Holland. As the investigation progresses, Frost realises that the comatose man's girlfriend, Philly Williams—Pecksmith's stepdaughter—had contacted Dearne in desperation due to her addiction. She fled after seeing her stepdad's stolen Mercedes at the meet-up location in Fulford Woods, only to spot a blue car arriving. Frost deduces that Warrinder met Dearne in Fulford Woods at the same time Carpenter was there for a sexual liaison. Frost races to the courthouse, where Warrinder is being held hostage by his client Luke Hands, whom Frost had previously interrogated in connection with Dearne's death. Fearing he will be blamed for the murder, Luke forces Warrinder to confess at gunpoint. Warrinder admits that Dearne had been blackmailing him over his drug addiction and demanded the £5,000, so he killed him and hid his body in the Mercedes. Frost calms Luke down, leading to Warrinder's arrest. Warrinder insists his coerced confession will not hold up in court, but Frost reveals that both Carpenter and Philly can identify him. Although Cremond reprimands Frost for confronting a gunman without a protective vest, she acknowledges his success, though Frost claims the gun was unloaded and there was no danger. Frost later privately reveals he had removed the bullet from the gun after Luke surrendered it.

=== Series 7 (1999–2000) ===
No. overall	No. in series	Title	Directed by	Written by	Original release date	UK viewers (millions)
25	1	"Line of Fire (Part One)"	Robert Knights	Michael Russell	25 December 1999	12.10
As Christmas Day approaches, DI Frost and Dorridge are called to investigate the murder of a young regional crime squad detective, Tim Fox. Fox's leader, Detective Superintendent Finlay and his number two, DI Mark Newcombe, take command of the case, believing Fox was murdered by an organised crime gang dealing in stolen cars. Frost convinces the chief constable to let him rejoin the case to ensure there are no questions of police corruption due to £1,000 of cash found in Fox's car. Frost believes the killer knew Fox as there are no signs of self defense. During the regional squad's raid on the car thieves, they find the gun that killed Fox. Frost remains unconvinced, especially after learning that Newcombe was having an affair with Fox's wife, Helen. She tells Frost that she had ended things with Newcombe because he had become obsessive and violent, and believes he killed her husband so she would be free to be with him. Frost deduces that Newcombe planted the gun during the raid to frame the gang. He confronts Newcombe, noticing he has a new mountainbike with tires matching those found near Fox's body, but he claims he bought two bikes, gifting one to Helen. Simultaneously, Frost and Dorridge investigate a series of pets killed by a rifle, and home burglaries where little is stolen but excessive damage is caused. Elsewhere, a power plant worker, Cockcroft, falls to his death in a mysterious accident after his house was earlier burgled and his fish tank destroyed. Aggressive and misogynistic employee, Ray English, had earlier been told to stay away from Cockcroft's daughter, Tracy. While attending hospital for an injury, Frost runs into Shirley Fisher, who asks for his help with a 16-year-old who has just given birth and who she believes plans to run away. Frost identifies the girl as a missing person and summons her parents, but advises the girl's father that he must do better if his daughter was too scared to reveal her pregnancy; the father embraces his grandchild and begs his daughter's forgiveness. Frost and Shirley agree to meet later, but Frost is caught in a bank robbery.
26	2	"Line of Fire (Part Two)"	Robert Knights	Michael Russell	1 January 2000	11.95
Frost convinces the bank robber to surrender. After learning of his predicament, Shirley forgives Frost for missing their date, and they agree to spend New Year's Eve together. During interrogation, Newcombe tells Frost that he and Helen had planted money to make Fox appear corrupt so they could threaten him with blackmail, and that Helen killed the violent Fox in self-defense. Frost brings Helen in for questioning and notes that her answers are flawless, making them seem rehearsed. While speaking to his colleague, Ernie Trigg, Frost learns that Helen was involved in record keeping at the station months earlier during a gun amnesty, and that a record of one gun has been deleted. Meanwhile, Ray and his like-minded friend, Sam Goodwin, attend Cockcroft's funeral, where Sam asks out his colleague Anne, however, Anne's friend, Sally Wainwright, warns her off. In response, Sam shoots Sally's dog dead. Ray takes his own revenge on Sally for rejecting him by cutting her car brakes, causing a crash that leaves her in a coma. On New Year's Eve, ambitious WPC Susan Kavanaugh investigates owners of rifles that can fire the .22 bullets linked to the pet crimes. She confronts Sam, and Ray knocks her out and takes her captive after learning that Sam killed Sally's dog and that they will now be linked to the other crimes. Ray goes to the power plant to create an alibi while Frost, having deduced that the burglaries and shootings are linked to the power plant, goes in search of Kavanaugh, believing she is in danger. He catches Sam attempting to flee and then goes to the power plant to confront Ray, who, while escaping, falls through a tall gantry. Despite Frost's efforts to save him, Ray falls to his death. On New Year's Day, Frost informs Ray's ex-policeman father, George, about Ray's death. George, ashamed of his son's actions, claims he has no son, but Frost reprimands him, saying that if George had paid attention sooner, he could have helped Ray and avoided this outcome. Having recovered Helen's bike, Frost arrests her, accusing Helen of killing Fox in cold blood and then letting Newcombe take all the blame. Frost later celebrates the new year with Shirley, but she is unexpectedly called to work at the hospital; Frost enjoys his indian meal alone.

=== Series 8 (2001) ===
No. overall	No. in series	Title	Directed by	Written by	Original release date	UK viewers (millions)
27	1	"Benefit of the Doubt (Part One)"	Roger Bamford	David Gilman	14 January 2001	14.69
Frost is pulled in different directions, as a man is impersonating him and sexually assaulting women; a young woman, Anne (Joanne Froggatt), has turned up believing Frost is her father; and he has been assigned a new officer, DS Terry Reid (Robert Glenister), who has been abruptly transferred after a complaint from the influential father of a university student, Tim Hamilton (David Birkin), who Reid suspects is selling contraband cigarettes. Frost and Reid's first case involves a woman, identified as Sylvia Carter, whose remains are found dismembered on the railway tracks after being run over by several trains. She worked for a local sandwich maker, and Frost is convinced she was having an affair with someone and was illicitly selling excess sandwich stock for profit. Meanwhile, Dr Helena Gibson (Arkie Whiteley), a senior surgeon at the local hospital in Denton, goes missing over a weekend. A professional committed to securing proper funding for her department from her cost-cutting boss, Jameson (David Horovitch), her personality left her disliked by many at the hospital, leaving no shortage of suspects.
28	2	"Benefit of the Doubt (Part Two)"	Roger Bamford	David Gilman	15 January 2001	14.44
Frost solves the Sylvia Carter case after learning she was indeed accidentally hit by a train while crossing the tracks with her affair partner, who hid his involvement out of fear of his wife taking his children. Reid is seemingly brutally beaten while investigating Hamilton's protection racket, which physically abuses shopkeepers to enforce the sale of illegal cigarettes. When Superintendent Mullett and the press liaison officer accuse Reid of being beaten while buying drugs to feed his old addiction, Frost robustly defends Reid. Frost dedicates himself to cracking the cigarette ring to avenge Reid's assault, and finding Reid's stolen war medal. He traces the medal to teenagers, who can place Frost's impersonator at the scene. Frost arrests the impersonator—identified as one of Frost's former arrests, Larry Brewer—and secures the case against Hamilton. Reid makes a full recovery, admitting he actually slipped while trying to arrest Brewer and hit his head on a sink. Frost's instincts allow him to connect an abandoned truck of medical waste with the disappearance of Helena Gibson and he recovers her remains before they can be incinerated at a specialist warehouse. There are three prime suspects: Jameson, whom she was going to expose for corruption if he did not improve her department funding; Dr Retnik (Frank Kovacs), whom she wanted to resign because she believed he was responsible for the high number of unexplained deaths in Bed 5 of the ward; and James Ingram (Bill Fellows), the father of a young boy who died following surgery overseen by Gibson. All the men have unassailable alibis for the day of her death. Frost deduces that Gibson was actually killed days earlier and preserved in the hospital's freezer because their own incinerator was malfunctioning. Retnik is revealed as the murderer. Gibson believed Retnik's capabilities may have been compromised, resulting in the deaths, but had decided to give him a chance. However, Retnik misinterpreted a discussion between Gibson and Jameson as an attempt to oust him, and worried he would lose everything, Retnik killed her. Retnik and Frost fight by the incinerator until Frost gets the upper hand and arrests him. Frost also realises that the deaths in Bed 5 were caused by a cleaner unwittingly unplugging medical equipment for cleaning equipment, ending the inexplicable deaths. To Frost's dismay, a DNA test reveals Anne is not his daughter, but they part amicably.

=== Series 9 (2002) ===
No. overall	No. in series	Title	Directed by	Written by	Original release date	UK viewers (millions)
29	1	"Mistaken Identity (Part One)"	Roger Bamford	David Gilman	27 January 2002	12.37
While Superintendent Mullett and the Denton station prepares for the arrival of Babcock (Michael Cochrane), from Her Majesty's Inspectorate of Constabulary (HMIC), which will determine their future funding, Frost and a new CID team member, DC Ronnie Lonnegan (Michelle Joseph), investigate three murders: an unidentified body found in a reservoir, and the deaths of Jean and Paul Harris, who were bound, doused in petrol, and burned alive. The main suspect is the Harris's handyman, Mike Patterson (Jason Merrells), who was having an affair with Jean, as she was unsatisfied because of Paul's paraplegy, and Paul's father Arnold Harris (Barrie Ingham), who disliked Jean. Forensics indicate a connection between the drowned man and the Harrises' murder owing to the presence of garden lime at both crime scenes. Frost recruits psychologist Pam Hartley (Susan Penhaligon), on the Harris case, who surmises he is pursuing a true psychopath, who enjoyed watching them burn. .Frost cares for a dog after his homeless owner is beaten by a mysterious suspect who set fire to a car owned by Paul Harris's father. Frost also intervenes in an ice cream van turf war after discovering one of the companies is dealing ecstasy alongside sweets, and investigates the disappearance of a young woman, Melanie Monkton (Kate Maberly), after her beloved horse is euthanised following a break-in.
30	2	"Mistaken Identity (Part Two)"	Roger Bamford	David Gilman	28 January 2002	11.66
Frost meets Melanie's wealthy and self-absorbed parents, Harry and Fiona (Annette Ekblom), who are not overly concerned about her disappearance, even after her car is found abandoned. Melanie eventually returns, revealing she spent the weekend in London with Paul Matthews, a jockey with whom Fiona was having an affair, and Fiona arranges an assault on Paul for seducing her daughter. The investigation also reveals that Harry was committing insurance fraud by faking the euthanisation of Melanie's horse to help settle his debts. Frost interrogates Mike Patterson but determines he is not the serial killer. The drowned man is identified as Reginald Molloy, and Frost realises that Harris's father and Molloy's mother were both witnesses 13 years earlier during the trial of brutal thug Charlie Layman, for a fatal armed robbery. However, Layman died a year previously. After meeting other witnesses, Toolan and Lonnegan learn that they have also had relatives die over the preceding year, including a young child. It is also learned that the families had all used a similar looking man for handywork, indicating the killer got close to each of them before striking. Frost and Toolan deduce that the killer is targeting the witnesses' loved ones to make them suffer. Following another murder, Frost deduces that the killer is Layman's son, Jeffrey Meadows (Jonjo O'Neill). He had been put into care as a child to protect him from his abusive father and drug addict mother, but his father continued to send him letters to control him from prison. Pam was the psychologist who recommended he go into care. Jeffrey abducts Pam and traps her in the pipes of an auxiliary pumping house, which he floods with water. Frost and Lonnegan track down Jeffrey, but with his work complete, he commits suicide by leaping from a bridge. Mullett is able to surmise where Pam may be and Frost rescues her just before she drowns. The HMI, who has a vendetta against Frost for his unorthodox methods, proposes withholding the Denton stations funding, but Frost and Mullett are able to convince him that the serious crimes they have just solved prove the station's worth.

=== Series 10 (2003) ===
No. overall	No. in series	Title	Directed by	Written by	Original release date	UK viewers (millions)
31	1	"Hidden Truth"	Paul Harrison	David Gilman	19 January 2003	11.71
London drug lord Jack Flynn murders one of his dealers in Denton. The only witness, Cathy Thompson, is placed in protective custody, but Flynn's professional hitman, George Starkey, assaults her home and critically wounds a WPC protecting her before fleeing. Frost is tasked with protecting Cathy and her young son, Robbie, until she can testify against Flynn, and requests DS Terry Reid's assistance owing to his connections with the Metropolitan Police in London. Flynn hires a second, younger and brasher, hitman, Gary Tinley, to distract the police from Starkey. Armed response team members Alan Hadley and Kenny Russell seemingly spot Tinley, but Russell is killed while pursuing him. Frost deduces that the precision of the gunfire indicates that Hadley actually killed Russell, especially after Tinley is arrested and admits he dropped his gun during an earlier encounter with the police. Reid confirms this after learning that Hadley's wife had been having an affair with Russell. They later find Hadley has hanged himself out of guilt. Starkey attacks the new police safehouse that only select personnel know about, and though he again flees, Cathy uses the distraction to run away with Robbie, no longer wanting to risk their lives to put away Flynn. Frost realises that someone is leaking information to Flynn, discovering that Eileen Cleary, a member of the prosecution team against Flynn, is responsible, as she had a son with Flynn six years earlier. Cleary is arrested, and while Frost and Reid review Cathy's witness statement, they discover that Robbie witnessed the crime, but Cathy took responsibility to protect him. Frost and Reid race against time, as Cathy had agreed to meet Cleary at the Crannock Air Museum. Starkey attacks Cathy as the police close in, but Frost and Reid successfully capture him. Robbie testifies against Flynn, securing the case against him. Later, the Denton officers finally find Frost's winning lottery ticket worth £5 million, lost in his typically sloppy file-keeping, but learn that while his numbers are correct, his ticket is out of date.
32	2	"Close Encounters"	Paul Harrison	Michael Russell	3 March 2003	12.24
Frost finds himself working with DS Hazel Wallace again when two separate cases need his attention. The first involves a series of robberies at newly-bought houses. Frost uncovers a lead when a young boy of a hostile divorced couple goes missing, and the father is unable to explain where he was that night. He deduces that the father, who works for a removals company, has been tipping off burglars in exchange for cash to help with his financial struggles. Frost's arrest of the gang includes a high-speed chase of their scout, flanked by a fleet of delivery bikers from Frost's favourite fast food restaurants, and he locates the missing child hiding in his father's workplace, hoping in vain to reunite his parents in their search for him. Although they do not get back together, they do become more amicable towards each other. The second case involves a murdered security guard at Lightfoot quarry, a crime that was witnessed by an autistic young man, Laurence Burrell (Jim Sturgess), who believes aliens and the American government are after him. Forensic evidence links Burrell to the murder weapon and he is arrested, but he is unable to cope trapped in an unfamiliar location and absconds. The quarry's owner, Charlie Lightfoot, accuses his old business partner, Stuart Mackintosh, of attacking the quarry and killing the guard to scare Lightfoot into selling it cheaply. Mackintosh needs the quarry, which will serve as a lake in his Denton Park housing development, as his own financial state relies on the project's completion. Lightfoot offers to sell it for an extortionate price as revenge for Mackintosh leading him into financial ruin decades earlier. Burrell returns to the quarry and steals explosives, intending to blow it up so the aliens will leave him alone, and Frost risks his life to try to save him. When Frost is left incapacitated, Burrell is able to calm down and helps move Frost to safety before the explosives detonate. With investors ready to move ahead, a reluctant Mackintosh has his henchman kill Lightfoot, but Frost quickly deduces his involvement, thanks to Burrell, and arrests Mackintosh and his henchman.
33	3	"Held in Trust"	Roger Bamford	David Gilman	14 September 2003	10.37
Frost finds his belief in the law tested when his latest case involves known paedophiles and missing and abused children. A child, Bobby Palmer, goes missing while with his father at a football match, and a murdered child, who was beaten and malnourished, is found in a landfill site. The malnourished boy is traced to a family who bring runaway kids into their home to portray as their own children to claim additional benefit funding. When the boy developed tuberculosis and seemed unresponsive, the father assumed he was dead and dumped him at the landfill site, where he eventually died. Frost's investigation of an apparent hit-and-run reveals the man, Peter Johnson, was bludgeoned beforehand. He learns that Johnson was a paedophile, seemingly keeping his urges under control, but was spotted associating with unapologetic paedophile Anton Caldwell. Frost follows clues in Caldwell's taunts during an interrogation, which leads him to an abandoned railway line where he uncovers Bobby's body. Meanwhile, Frost's colleagues encourage him to go before the promotions board, while behaving himself, to apply for the role of Chief Inspector. Although Frost leaves the interview midway to pursue his investigation, he receives the promotion. Forensics reveal that Caldwell was involved in Bobby's murder. The investigation uncovers that the Palmers were visited by a social worker who accused Bobby's father of abusing him. Frost learns no such visit was recorded by social services and that Martin Drew was fired as a social worker after becoming obsessed with understanding paedophiles, bringing him into contact with Johnson and Caldwell. Frost finds home videos of school children at Drew's home and learns another young boy has been kidnapped by Caldwell. Frost and his team quickly catch Caldwell and Drew, who reveals that they killed Johnson because he tried to stop them. Frost loses his temper when Caldwell states what he did to his victims, and punches him. Caldwell presses charges against Frost, leading to an enquiry, and though he has the backing of his team and Mullett, who will swear Caldwell was resisting arrest, Frost refuses to lie in court. Frost is placed on indefinite suspension, costing him his promotion, and he accepts that this will likely be the end of his career. Frost's colleagues applaud him as he leaves.

=== Series 11 (2003–2004) ===
No. overall	No. in series	Title	Directed by	Written by	Original release date	UK viewers (millions)
34	1	"Another Life"	Roger Bamford	David Gilman	26 October 2003	11.41
Seven months after his suspension, Frost is reinstated to Denton CID, and Caldwell has been murdered in prison. Teamed up with DS Maureen Lawson, Frost is thrust into two different murder investigations, while contending with toothache after enjoying a defective lollipop. A dismembered body is found in a fridge, which when pieced together is revealed to have a second left foot traced to a different person. It transpires that the victim is linked to the highly-competitive local ballroom scene. Victory-obsessed dancer Delores Delmonte (Amanda Root) is identified as the culprit, having killed the victim because he abandoned her for a different partner, and she is caught preparing to kill her new partner after losing the latest competition. Following her arrest, the remorseless Delmonte states she was putting the men out of their misery as they were not skilled enough to compete at her level. A separate murder case focuses on Eddie Burrows, a man stabbed to death and dumped in a canal while holding £6000 in cash. Discovered to be leading separate lives with wives and children, Frost questions whether one of the wives learned of this and took revenge. However, Frost soon uncovers that Burrows was blackmailing a local doctor, Patrick Knight, and a pharmacist for large sums of money after learning of their fraudulent medicine scheme. At risk of losing her affluent lifestyle due to Burrows' costly demands, Knight's wife, Antonia (Lucy Robinson), confronted Burrows to convince him to stop, but when he mocked her, she lost her temper and stabbed him.
35	2	"Dancing in the Dark"	Roy Battersby	Christopher Blake	22 February 2004	12.96
A man's body is found on a waste tip, stripped of everything but his clothes and an empty wallet. After his wife, Diane Hawkins, reports the man, Joe, missing, Frost learns that Joe was an absent, abusive, and alcoholic husband, and the meek Diane had fallen in love with the equally meek sleep therapist Colin Bayliss. Diane attempts to take money from the sleeping Joe before running away with Colin, but Joe awoke and began choking on his own vomit. In a panic, Diane and Colin smothered him and dumped his body trying to make it look like a mugging. As it is unclear if Colin died from the choking or smothering, Frost is unsure if either will be prosecuted. Alongside cocky young undergraduate DC Jasper Tranter (Nicholas Burns), Frost investigates the murder of a young escort, Heather Wills (Amber Sainsbury), who is found dead in a hotel room. The hotel room was registered to wealthy businessman Stephen Richford, a close family friend of Heather. He had booked an escort, which turned out to be Heather, and she set about seducing him for money. Guilt-ridden for sleeping with his daughter's best friend, Stephen is later found dead in an apparent suicide. Heather's apartment is ransacked for something, which Frost later discovers concealed in Heather's purse—forged passports used to smuggle women into the UK, which Heather was withholding from her boss until she was paid more money. Though Heather's boss is involved in the smuggling, Frost realises that it is his business partner, the ruthless Terry Hirst, that killed Heather and staged Stephen's suicide to frame him for her murder. Frost prepares a sting operation at a greyhound race track to draw Hirst out and arrest him.

=== Series 12 (2005) ===
No. overall	No. in series	Title	Directed by	Written by	Original release date	UK viewers (millions)
36	1	"Near Death Experience"	Paul Jackson	David Gilman	25 September 2005	10.28
A masked killer breaks into a home, savagely murdering a mother, Helen Croft, and wounding her teenage daughter, Lucy, before fleeing. Frost is sent to investigate after the bodies are found by a priest, Fr David Rose (Danny Webb), who explains Helen had been excommunicated from the church. Frost and Detective Sergeant "Razor" Sharpe (Philip Jackson) lead the investigation, and psychological profiler Dr Martine Phillips surmises they are dealing with a serial killer who derives sexual gratification from killing. A national search identifies five other similar murders in which the victims match a specific profile. Helen's autopsy reveals she had aborted a child several weeks earlier, casting suspicion on her alcoholic ex-boyfriend, Steve Markham (Jeff Rawle), and Frost discovers that her sister, Sylvia Ford (Lia Williams), is having an affair with Rose. After another victim is found, Frost deduces that Helen was trying to indicate who killed her by reaching for her locket, which was a gift from Sylvia's religious husband, Bill (Mick Ford), and purchased from Markham. Frost identifies the next victim after realising that when Bill earlier recited a quote from Matthew 5:16, he was egotistically giving him a clue in the belief Frost would not understand it. The police catch Bill in the act and arrest him. He explains to Frost his hatred for women, who did not appreciate his apparent good nature and kindness, so he decided to show them what a man can do. He admits he targeted Helen because she chose someone like Markham over him. Throughout the case, Frost feels guilty after Toolan is badly injured while helping prevent a suicide. Toolan's wife expresses her dislike for Frost, stating that it is his unorthodox methods which often put Toolan at risk.

=== Series 13 (2006) ===
No. overall	No. in series	Title	Directed by	Written by	Original release date	UK viewers (millions)
37	1	"Endangered Species"	Roy Battersby	Christopher Blake	5 November 2006	10.07
Frost struggles sharing his house with trainee DC Robert Presley (Blake Ritson), who is romantically pursuing a WPC. Criminal Kevin Flangan escapes prosecution due to a lack of evidence, but is forced to turn to Frost for help when his life is endangered. Flanagan admits he was helping Vietnamese smugger Lahn Loc illegally store exotic and endangered animals at his farm, as part of an international animal smuggling ring, but when it was discovered that Flanagan and Loch were keeping money for themselves, the ringleaders had Loch executed. Scotland Yard and HMRC investigators insist that Flanagan is released, against Frost's wishes, so he can unwittingly lead them to his bosses, but the inadequate surveillance loses him while Flanagan is in the Shawcuts pet superstore. His superior, Dennis Prior (Anton Lesser), encourages Flanagan to leave the country, a pretense to have him willingly accompany smuggler Colin Edwards so he can be executed. Frost traces Flanagan's death to Prior and Edwards, who turn on their boss, Shawcuts' owner Kenneth Shaw, ending their part of the smuggling ring. The Harris family are shocked to return from holiday to find the nude corpse of local art teacher Patrick Bartley in their bedroom. A search of his studio yields revealing photos of a female colleague, music teacher Carol Haymarsh, but Frost is more interested in what happened to the house key belonging to the Harris's son, Adam. Frost learns that Adam gave the key to his 15-year-old friend, Malcolm, so he could use the house to have sex with Carol, and when Bartley found out, he blackmailed her for sex in what he believed was Malcolm's house. Carol states she resisted his efforts and broke his nose, before he died of a heart attack. She is arrested for her inappropriate relationship with Malcolm.

=== Series 14 (2008) ===
No. overall	No. in series	Title	Directed by	Written by	Original release date	UK viewers (millions)
38	1	"Mind Games"	Paul Harrison	Michael Russell	12 October 2008	8.37
Motivational speakers Roman Cassell (Dhafer L'Abidine) and Tom Brody (Vince Leigh) are tricked by their lovers into disrobing for a midnight swim, at which point the girls run off with the men's clothes, leaving them to streak through Denton. Brody is arrested, but Cassell returns to his office and is found beaten to death the following day. Suspicion falls on millionaire Jason Cohu (Ariyon Bakare) and his father-in-law, Joshua Ray (Joseph Marcell), who blame the men for the death of Jason's wife after her Olympic dreams were dashed by their illegal steroid distribution. Frost deduces the lack of blood at the scene exonerates Jason and Joshua, but discovers that one of the women, Babs Sellwood (Elizabeth Berrington), was in an abusive relationship with Cassell, and when he mocked her and threatened to tell her children she was a slut, she snapped and struck him over the head, killing him. Intellectually disabled convict Carl Meyer (Jonathan Slinger) is released from prison after 20 years of a sentence for murdering his childhood friend, 14-year-old Jane Crewes, though there was insufficient evidence to charge him for the disappearance of her cousin, Harriet Collingham. Carl returns to his home village where the residents are hostile towards his presence, particularly Jane's surviving parent, David (Keith Barron), his sister Gloria (Paula Wilcox), Harriet's mother, and her father, Charlie (John Castle). When a housing development digs up Harriet's remains, Frost brings in Carl, but is slowly convinced that Carl's protestations of innocence may be true, especially after forensics uncovers that Harriet was likely drowned in the river, and her body re-buried in the woods after Carl was originally jailed. After learning that Harriet had been avoiding her parents and locking herself away, Frost interrogates Charlie, who confesses he was having an affair on the day Harriet died. Frost notices a photo of a boat owned by David and realises the truth: David was raping his niece, Harriet, and killed her to keep his secret. Jane witnessed the murder and he killed her as well, but Carl found Jane's body before David could hide it. Frost confronts David at Jane's grave, but he commits suicide to avoid arrest. Frost drinks over his regrets that if he had not gotten so close to the families he may have asked them more questions, securing justice earlier and sparing Carl a prison sentence, but Mullett reassures him that they must remember their mistakes to avoid repeating them.
39	2	"Dead End"	Roger Bamford	David Gilman	19 October 2008	8.52
Children's clown Lofty Parker is found dead in an alley. Frost and Toolan investigate and discover that Parker had been stealing jewellery from the homes where he performed, finding a gold ring on his person. Joan Atkins, who hosted his final show, claims that no jewellery is missing, but Toolan finds a ring belonging to a previous victim among Atkins' possessions. This leads Frost to realise that Atkins noticed her rings were missing and told her husband, who then confronted Parker, struck him, and mistakenly took the wrong jewellery back. However, an old head injury of Parker made the blow fatal. The Heal family is appalled to see Mark Harrison, the man who killed four people, including three members of their family, with his lorry, now driving a local bus. Harrison had appealed his sentence, and his conviction was overturned, with the accident blamed on a fault with the lorry. One night, Harrison and his bus conductress, Jessica Green, are abducted. Frost works the case alongside DS Annie Marsh (Cherie Lunghi), who once reported him for dereliction of duty after he pursued a knife assault suspect without backup, leading to an officer being injured. While Frost was cleared of any wrongdoing, the incident stalled his career for some time. Green is eventually released by the abductors after they learn she is diabetic and in need of insulin. Frost identifies an inconsistency in the alibi of the Heal's youngest son, who confesses that he and Robert Trusham, the husband of the fourth victim, abducted Harrison to teach him a lesson, with Green being an unfortunate bystander. Trusham tortures Harrison into admitting that the accident occurred because he was distracted by his mobile phone and then throws him into an elevator shaft with a noose around his neck, causing him to land on the elevator. Frost, Toolan, and Marsh trace Trusham to a condemned office building, where he gives them Harrison's recorded confession and turns himself in. Toolan escorts Trusham out of the building while Frost risks his life to rescue Harrison. However, Trusham convinces the unwitting Toolan to use the elevator, causing it to lower and hang Harrison to death, much to Trusham's delight. With the case closed, Frost credits Marsh for her work, but she admonishes him for risking his life, warning that his rule-bending will eventually be his undoing.
40	3	"In the Public Interest"	Paul Harrison	Thomas Ellice	26 October 2008	8.16
The naked bodies of three Eastern European immigrant workers are found, arranged in a triangle, in a grave at an old burial site, and an American anthropologist insists to Frost that these are ritual killings. However, Toolan discovers that the men were killed by carbon monoxide poisoning from a faulty heater in cheap accommodation, and the owner buried them that way to make the police think it was ritualistic. The anthropologist was pushing the ritual murder story because she has an upcoming book to promote. Frost must deal with powerful and wealthy businessman James Callum (Adrian Lukis), whose fitness instructor mistress, Rosemary (Sarah Matravers), is found dead on her houseboat. The profit-focused Callum is bulldozing the local youth club to build offices and has purchased local newspapers, using them to smear his opponents—implicating the youth leaders in a gay scandal that leads one to attempt suicide—and threatens to destroy Frost's reputation as well. Frost interviews Callum's closest associates, his fiercely loyal personal assistant, Michael Carne (Tam Williams), and his long term partner, Michelle, but as he gets closer to the truth, Frost's home is broken into and ransacked, at what he suspects is Callum's instruction. Frost infiltrates Callum's house to learn the truth and discovers that Michelle is the transgender identity of Michael. Michael attempts to kill Frost, but Callum arrives and shoots Michael in the back, killing him. Callum explains that he and Michael loved each other very much, but that Callum's frequent affairs had turned Michael's jealousy into murderous intent, leading to Rosemary's death. As Michael's trial would damage Callum's image and plans, he arranged a situation in which he would be able to kill Michael without punishment. Knowing his confession will be Frost's word against his own, and believing he will be celebrated as an officer-saving hero, Callum contently leaves, unaware Frost has secretly made an audio recording of the entire event.

=== Series 15 (2010) ===
No. overall	No. in series	Title	Directed by	Written by	Original release date	UK viewers (millions)
41	1	"If Dogs Run Free (Part One)"	Paul Harrison	Michael Russell	4 April 2010	8.79
Frost and his team assist RSPCA officer Christine Moorhead in dismantling an illegal dog-fighting ring, but its organiser, drug lord and money launderer Gerry Berland, avoids arrest after a delay makes him arrive after the police raid. Believing that his ex-friend and fellow teenager, Brian, tipped off the RSPCA, Berland's thuggish son, Sean, attacks Brian, and in the scuffle stabs him to death. Christine recognises Sean, and his unwitting accomplice, Neil, as they attend the same school as her own children. Berland arranges alibis for the boys, though both are overcome with guilt and want to cooperate. He coerces his wife, Sally, and Neil's parents to cooperate to keep the boys out of prison. Aware Christine is the only witness, Berland intimidates her and, when that does not work, has his drug-addicted thug, Lisowski, set the RSPCA unit on fire with Christine inside. Meanwhile a copycat criminal is replicating crimes from early in Frost's career, leading to a mugging, a murder, Frost's house being vandalised, and "You Die Next" being scrawled on his car.
42	2	"If Dogs Run Free (Part Two)"	Paul Harrison	Michael Russell	5 April 2010	9.94
Christine survives the fire relatively unscathed, and she and Frost bond romantically during their time together. Toolan's investigation of the copycat reveals a description fitting the station's new archivist, Jennifer. At her home, he and Frost find obsessive news clippings of Frost's cases and realise Jennifer is the daughter of his old colleague, whom Frost exposed for corruption, and spent the last few years of his life trying to find something to bring Frost down as well. Frost was close to Jennifer as a child, but her father's obsession has passed to her. Jennifer lures Frost to a rooftop where she orders him, at gunpoint, to jump, but Frost tackles her and she is arrested. Upset that Lisowski's arson attack was too excessive, Berland gives him a pure dose of cocaine which causes him to die of an overdose. Frost suspects Berland is involved but is unable to link the two men until Berland's solicitor Greg Salmond's car is stolen, used in a hit-and-run of a young girl, and found abandoned with a large stash of cocaine in the rear. His investigation leads Frost to arrest Salmond's colleagues, who used the drugs and took the car on a joyride, while CCTV shows Salmond purchasing the drugs from Lisowski. Frost leverages Salmond for the location of Berland's main drug, money, and dog fighting operations at a farm, leading to the collapse of his empire. Overcome with guilt and with no one to talk to, Sean hangs himself, and his distraught and long-abused mother leaves Berland. Devastated over his loss, and now realising what Brian's parents must have felt, Berland surrenders himself to Frost. Neil and his parents decide they must tell the police what they know, as it is what Sean wanted. Frost asks Christine to marry him. Her seemingly affable but actually relapsed alcoholic ex-husband, Allen, meets Christine after the wedding rehearsal to plead with her to get back with him, but she rejects him. On the wedding day, Frost, and his best man, Toolan, arrive at the church and are greeted by Mullett, before all three are deliberately struck by Allen's car. Allen is killed instantly, and Toolan later dies from his injuries, with his wife, Frost and Mullett at his bedside. Some time later, Frost bids farewell to George's coffin. He tells Christine that he has long dedicated himself to his job, which he considered to be a refuge, and gave up on having a personal life, unlike Toolan, but he realises now that he must prioritise his personal life, together with Christine, noting that he has a lot of time to make up for. Alternative endings were written and filmed, depicting Mullet or Frost dying instead of Toolan.
