= Ice Claw =

2008 children's novel by David Gilman

- First edition
- Author: David Gilman
- Publisher: Penguin Books Ltd.
- Publication date: 3 July 2008
- ISBN: 978-0-14-132303-9
- Preceded by: The Devil's Breath
- Followed by: Blood Sun

Ice Claw is a children's novel by David Gilman, published in 2008. It is the second book in Gilman's Danger Zone series with its principal character, eco hero teenager Max Gordon. It is preceded by The Devil's Breath (2007) and followed by Blood Sun.

== Plot ==
Max Gordon is participating in an X-Treme sports challenge, where he witnesses the final moments of a mysterious Basque monk, who screams a cryptic clue before plummeting to his death. The clue is a prophecy that predicts an ecological catastrophe that will kill millions around Europe.

When he is blamed for the monk's death, Max and his best friend Sayid follow the clues and discover betrayal and murder around every turn before meeting the man behind it all: the insane billionaire Tishenko.

== Main characters ==
- Max Gordon: The protagonist from the first novel comes back in this second book, and again the story is mainly shown from his point of view.
- Sophie Fauvre: An attractive young heroine that Max falls for. She plays more or less exactly the same role as Keelie van Reenen, from the first book.
- Tishenko: A billionaire madman with a crazy plot to threaten the environment. He is an outcast with a hideous physical deformity. He plays the same role as Shaka Chang, from the first book.

== Reception ==
Kirkus Reviews called Ice Claw an "action-packed adventure" and found it to be "equally exciting" as its predecessor, The Devil's Breath. They further indicated that it has "lots of relevant references for today’s teens, who will gobble it down".

Publishers Weekly highlighted the "nonstop" pace and plotting that "combin[es] sports action and combat", as well as "mystical additions" that "never overwhelm the fight scenes". They concluded, "Gilman writes a solid, occasionally thrilling action tale that manages to impart political, scientific, and geographic information without ever feeling like the dreaded 'message' book."

Booklist also reviewed the novel.
