= Jack Frost (detective) =

Fictional British Detective Inspector

- First appearance: Frost at Christmas (novel); "Care And Protection" (TV Episode, 6 December 1992)
- Last appearance: A Killing Frost; "If Dogs Run Free: Part Two" (TV Episode, 5 April 2010)
- Created by: R. D. Wingfield
- Portrayed by: Leslie Sands (BBC Radio); Derek Martin (BBC Radio); David Jason (TV)

In-universe information
- Occupation: Police detective
- Nationality: British

Detective Inspector William Edward "Jack" Frost, GC QPM, is a fictional detective created by R. D. Wingfield—characterised as sloppy, untidy, hopeless with paperwork—but unmatched at solving mysteries. The character has appeared in two radio plays, a dozen published novels, and a TV series spanning 42 episodes between 1992 and 2010.

"Jack" is a nickname, alluding to Jack Frost.

== Radio plays ==
The character first appeared in a radio play entitled Three Days of Frost first transmitted on BBC Radio 4 on 12 February 1977, which is a re-telling of Wingfield's "Frost at Christmas" (the novel had yet to be published). He was portrayed by Leslie Sands. The character's second appearance was also on BBC Radio 4, in a play entitled A Touch of Frost, based on Wingfield's second novel (of the same name), transmitted on 6 February 1982. In the second radio play the character was portrayed by Derek Martin.

== Novels ==
Wingfield published six novels about DI Frost, starting with Frost at Christmas in 1984.

Between 2011 and 2017, four Frost books were published under the name James Henry, with the approval of the Estate of R.D. Wingfield. In the case of First Frost, this pseudonym refers to James Gurbutt and Henry Sutton, but in Fatal Frost, Morning Frost and Frost at Midnight it refers to Gurbutt only. These are all prequels to the Wingfield novels. The first three books are set between 1981 and November 1982 when Frost was a Detective Sergeant, and Frost at Midnight is set in August 1983, when Frost is a Detective Inspector. The two latest—and so far last—Frost books are by Danny Miller.

1. Frost at Christmas (1984 / 1995, Bantam Crimeline, New York), ISBN 0-553-57168-0 (U.S. mass market paperback edition)
2. A Touch of Frost (1987 / 1995 Bantam Crimeline, New York), ISBN 0-553-57169-9 (U.S. mass market paperback edition)
3. Night Frost (1992, Constable, London / 1995, Bantam Crimeline, New York), ISBN 0-553-57167-2 (U.S. mass market paperback edition)
4. Hard Frost (1995 UK & U.S.) ISBN 0-553-57170-2 (U.S. mass market paperback edition)
5. Winter Frost (1999, Constable, London / 2000 Corgi Books, London) ISBN 0-552-14778-8 (Corgi Books paperback)
6. A Killing Frost (2008, Bantam Press / Corgi Books, London) ISBN 0-552-15689-2 (Corgi Books paperback)
7. First Frost (2011, Transworld Publishers Ltd / Corgi Books, London) ISBN 978-0-552-16176-3 (Corgi Books paperback)
8. Fatal Frost (2012, Bantam Press / Corgi Books, London) ISBN 978-0-593-06538-9 (Bantam Press hardback) ISBN 978-0-552-16177-0 (Corgi Books paperback)
9. Morning Frost (2013, Bantam Press / 2014, Corgi Books, London) ISBN 978-0-552-16853-3 (Corgi Books paperback)
10. Frost At Midnight (2017, Bantam Press / 2018 Corgi Books, London) ISBN 978-0-552-17079-6 (Corgi Books paperback)
11. A Lethal Frost (2018, Bantam Press / 2018 Corgi Books, London) ISBN 0-593-08002-5 (Corgi Books paperback)
12. The Murder Map (2019, Corgi Books, London) ISBN 9780552175067 (paperback original)

== Television series ==
Beginning in 1992, television adaptations of the novels, and further stories based on the characters were transmitted on ITV in the UK. The series starred David Jason as Frost. This series was broadcast under the umbrella title A Touch of Frost. There were thirty-eight stories broadcast (forty-two episodes, if counted individually). These have been released on VHS and DVD internationally.

Three endings were filmed for the final episode. The first ending saw Frost the victim of a hit-and-run on his wedding day, and later suffering a fatal heart attack in hospital. The second ending saw his colleague George Toolan die instead, as a result of the car crash. The third was similar to the second with Superintendent Mullet being the victim. The second ending was the one officially used (with David Jason's support). The ending in which Frost dies was screened during a tribute to the show on ITV1 on 6 April 2010.
