= David Gilman (writer) =

English screenwriter and novelist

David Gilman is an English television screen writer and novelist.

Before becoming a writer, Gilman was previously a fire-fighter, professional photographer and a soldier in the Parachute Regiment's Reconnaissance Platoon. He was educated in Wales and worked for some time as a marketing manager for a publishing company in South Africa. His early jobs included forestry work, JCB driver and window dresser.

He became a full-time writer in 1986. His Danger Zone series has been published in 15 countries. The first in the series was long listed for the CILIP Carnegie Medal and won the French Prix Polar Jeunesse. In 2017, The Last Horseman was on the shortlist for the Wilbur Smith Adventure awards. His book for young children, Monkey and Me, was nominated for the Carnegie Medal.

During his time working in television, Gilman was a principal writer on A Touch of Frost from 2000 to 2009. He also wrote for Dalziel and Pascoe.

He currently lives in Devon with his wife Suzy Chiazzari.

== Bibliography ==
Danger Zone

1. The Devil's Breath (2007)
2. Ice Claw (2008)
3. Blood Sun (2009)

Master of War

1. The Blooding (2013)
2. Defiant Unto Death (2015)
3. Gate of the Dead (2016)
4. Viper's Blood (2017)
5. Scourge of Wolves (2018)
6. Cross of Fire (2020)
7. Shadow of the Hawk (2021)
8. To Kill a King (2024)

The Englishman

1. The Englishman (2020)
2. Betrayal (2022)
3. Resurrection (2023)

Other Books

- Monkey and Me (2014)
- The Last Horseman (2016)
- Night Flight to Paris (2018)
