= The Devil's Breath =

2007 book by David Gilman

- First edition
- Author: David Gilman
- Series: Danger Zone
- Genre: Fiction
- Publisher: Penguin Books Ltd
- Publication date: 4 June 2007
- ISBN: 978-0-595-42924-0
- Followed by: Ice Claw

The Devil's Breath is the first of three novels in the Danger Zone series by David Gilman, the second being Ice Claw, and the third Blood Sun.

== Plot summary ==
Max Gordan is the main character in this book, he is a teenager attending a boarding school in Dartmoor, Devon, England. His mother was an environmental campaigner along with his ex-SAS father before she died mysteriously. At the start of The Devil's Breath, word comes that his father is missing. Max then decides to take matters into his own hands and travels alone to Namibia, where he meets up with an English-speaking Namibian teenage girl, and a Bushman boy who believes Max has supernatural powers. Max then finds out that now his life is joined to the Namibians and he must combine with them so he can save his father and the environment from Shaka Chang, a ruthless businessman.
