= A Touch of Frost =

British television detective series (1992–2010)

- Genre: Police procedural Drama
- Created by: R. D. Wingfield
- Starring: David Jason; Bruce Alexander; John Lyons; Arthur White
- Theme music composer: Barbara Thompson; Jon Hiseman
- Composers: Barbara Thompson; Jon Hiseman (1992–1997); Ray Russell (1999–2010)
- Country of origin: United Kingdom
- Original language: English
- No. of series: 15
- No. of episodes: 42 (list of episodes)

Production
- Running time: 75–100 minutes
- Production companies: Yorkshire Television (1992–2004); Granada Yorkshire (2005); ITV Productions (2006–2008); ITV Studios (2010)

Original release
- Network: ITV
- Release: 6 December 1992 – 5 April 2010

A Touch of Frost is a British television detective mystery drama series starring David Jason produced by Yorkshire Television (later ITV Studios) for ITV from 6 December 1992 until 5 April 2010, initially based on the Frost novels by R. D. Wingfield. Writing credit for the three episodes in the first 1992 series went to Richard Harris.

The series stars Jason as Detective Inspector William Edward "Jack" Frost GC QPM, an experienced and dedicated detective who frequently clashes with his superiors. In his cases, Frost is usually assisted by a variety of detective sergeants or constables, with each bringing a different slant to the particular case. Comic relief is provided by Frost's interactions with the bureaucratically-minded Superintendent Norman "Horn-rimmed Harry" Mullett, played by Bruce Alexander.

A number of young actors had their major debut as supporting cast in the show, including: Matt Bardock, Ben Daniels, Neil Stuke, Mark Letheren, Colin Buchanan, Jason Maza, Jim Sturgess, Damian Lewis and Marc Warren.

== Background ==
The series is set in the fictional southern England town of Denton. Denton may be in Berkshire, Oxfordshire or Wiltshire. The series is well-known for its use of local colour for filming locations.

The role of Frost was notable in changing the public perception of David Jason from a predominantly comic actor to a dramatic actor.

At a press conference in London on 15 September 2008, David Jason announced that he would be leaving the role of DI Jack Frost. Jason's main reason was that Frost was by now the oldest detective on television and he felt that it was 'natural' to retire as Frost. At 68, a police detective would already have been retired for eight years. Jason said: "You wouldn't want me to play Frost in a wheelchair, would you?... Frost is getting a little long in the tooth. I still enjoy doing it and it's a great part but I just think he's got to retire. It'll be a sad day."

The exterior of Wakefield Train Station was used for exterior shots of Denton Train Station.

The now closed courts in Dewsbury Town Hall, Dewsbury were often used for court scenes.

== Cast ==
=== Main cast ===
- David Jason as DI Jack Frost GC QPM
- Bruce Alexander as Superintendent Norman Mullett
- John Lyons as DS George Toolan
- Arthur White as PC Ernie Trigg

=== Supporting cast ===
==== Supervising officers ====
- Neil Phillips as DCI Jim Allen (1992–1994)
- Matthew Marsh as DCI Charlie Hawkes (1995)
- Nigel Harrison as DCI Jim Peters (1996–1997)
- Gwyneth Strong as DSI Bailey (1997)
- Michael Cochrane as Chief Superintendent Babcock (2002)

==== Detective sergeants ====
- Tony Haygarth as Sandy Gilmore (1992)
- Caroline Harker as WPC/DS Hazel Wallace (1992–2003)
- Matt Bardock as DC/DS Clive Barnard (1992–1997)
- Sally Dexter as DC/DS Maureen Lawson (1994–2003)
- Neil Stuke as Frank Nash (1996)
- Russell Hunter as Rab Prentice (1996)
- Susannah Doyle as Liz Maud (1997)
- Philip Jackson as Billy Sharpe (1999–2005)
- Paul Jesson as Bill Dorridge (1999–2000)
- Robert Glenister as Terry Reid (2001–2003)
- Cherie Lunghi as Annie Marsh (2008)

==== Detective constables ====
- George Anton as DC Webster (1992)
- Jon Sotherton as Mark Howard (1992–1996)
- Lennie James as Carl Tanner (1994)
- Neil Dudgeon as Frank Costello (1994)
- Jim Shepley as DC Ketley (1994–1996)
- Charles De'Ath as DC Collier (1997)
- Stephen Moyer as DC Burton (1997)
- Nicholas Burns as Jasper Tranter (2004)
- Blake Ritson as Robert "Elvis" Presley (2006)

==== Uniformed officers ====
- Paul Moriarty as Sgt. Bill Wells (1992–1997)
- Bill Roarke as Sgt. Arthur Hanlon (1992–1995)
- Stuart Barren as Sgt. Johnnie Johnson (1992–1996)
- James McKenna as Sgt. Don Brady (1996–2010)
- Sean Blowers as Sgt. Alan Hadley (2003)
- Vincent Regan as PC Shelby (1992)
- Martin Moss as PC Lambert (1992)
- Ian Driver as PC Jordan (1992–1994)
- Christopher Rickwood as PC Keith Stringer (1992–1994)
- George Thompson as PC Simms (1992–1996)
- Colin Buchanan as PC Mike Austin (1994)
- Ian Mercer as PC Craven (1996)
- Colette Brown as WPC Claire Toms (1996)
- Katrina Levon as WPC Lindsey Hunter (1996)
- Jan Graveson as WPC Jane Brent (1996)
- Miranda Pleasance as WPC Annie Holland (1997–1999)
- Georgia Mackenzie as WPC Susan Kavanagh (2000)
- Michelle Joseph as WPC Ronnie Lonnegan (2002)
- Daniele Lydon as WPC Tracy Miller (2003)
- Stuart Bowman as PC Kenny Russell (2003)
- Emily Corrie as WPC Louise Harmison (2006)

==== Police pathologists ====
- David McKail as Dr. David McKenzie (1992–2008)
- David Gooderson as Dr. Derek Simpkins (1992–2006)

==== Other service personnel ====
- Ralph Brown as Captain Carlisle (1996)
- Sara Stewart as Martine Phillips (2005)

==== Local press ====
- Bill Stewart as Sandy Longford (1992–1999)

== Characters ==
=== Main characters ===
- DI William Edward "Jack" Frost (David Jason, 1992–2010) is a cynical and mercurial detective, whose talents are offset by human failings which include drinking other people's beverages, a scruffy fashion sense, and leaving his home, office, and car in states of disarray. He is frequently shown to avoid paperwork, leaving his subordinates to finish it. He never uses a police notebook to record evidence and other information, instead scribbling notes on various bits of paper which he stuffs in his coat pockets. Frost is widowed, respected and admired by his colleagues, and shown to be a well-meaning but flawed man. On several occasions Frost breaks the law and plants evidence to get an arrest or conducts searches without permission. This type of behaviour regularly sees Frost suspended, disciplined or threatened with the same throughout the series. In the first novel, his name is shown to be Jack Frost. It was felt by the producers that the name Jack Frost was implausible for the TV series, so Frost was given William as his real first name, or "Billy" as his wife called him, with Jack becoming a nickname. Also in the novels, he was a chain-smoker; this again was altered in the series to have Frost quit smoking in the first episode and occasionally struggle with stopping the habit over the subsequent two series, with a penchant for unhealthy foods taking its place.
- Superintendent Norman Mullett (Bruce Alexander, 1992–2010), a social climber concerned with appearances and ambitious for promotion, is Frost's boss and his constant foil on the job. Mullett has a love-hate relationship with Frost, whose detective skills he admires but whose people and political skills he abhors. On several occasions, Mullett has defended Frost against their superiors. Frost in turn actively avoids running into Mullett, as most encounters include being berated for failing to observe proper protocol. He (along with his fellow officers) also enjoys poking fun at the Superintendent verbally when he's not around, and occasionally sneak into his office to misuse it in some way. None of the officers are actively shown to respect him very much beyond being their boss.

The long-suffering Mullett frequently threatens to sack Frost, but Frost's ability to close cases usually saves him. Frost's nickname for Mullett is "Horn-rimmed Harry" due to the traditional design of his spectacles. His first name was given in the novel "Hard Frost" as Stanley, but this novel was not written until a couple of years after the name Norman was given to the character by the writers of the TV series.

=== Supervising officers ===
- DCI Jim Allen (Neil Phillips, 1992–1994), the first DCI to feature in the series. He and Frost get on well, sharing jokes about Mullett and concern for each other's emotions on harrowing cases. They argue only when Frost is taken off a serial rape case. He is mentioned in the second episode of the third series as "being away", but is never seen again.
- DCI Charlie Hawkes (Matthew Marsh, 1995), temporarily replaced DCI Allen. Popular with his subordinates, Hawkes' tenure is marked by his mishandling of the death of a young girl. Hawkes viciously obtains a confession from a local male with Down's Syndrome, but Frost finds the actual killer. Hawkes also inadvertently allows an imposter to pose as a visiting CID officer, too.
- DCI Jim Peters (Nigel Harrison, 1996–1997), replaces temporary DCI Charlie Hawkes. He is more laid-back and humorous than Allen and appears to have a good relationship with Frost. He is the last DCI featured in the series, with Frost taking over the position in all but name for the rest of the show.
- DSI Bailey (Gwyneth Strong, 1997), is a Discipline & Complaints officer who suspends Frost, believing he's part of an evidence tampering conspiracy led by former superior Charlie Fairclough. Frost, innocent of the charge, persuades Fairclough to confess. Despite her clashes with Frost and Mullett during the case, Frost admits she is a good and effective officer.
- Chief Superintendent Babcock (Michael Cochrane, 2002) is a senior officer within Her Majesty's Inspectorate of Constabulary, reviewing Denton CID. Babcock strongly dislikes Frost, aiming to ensure his dismissal. After Frost stops a serial killer and numerous other crimes, Babcock is unable to get his wish.

=== Detective sergeants ===
- George Toolan (John Lyons, 1992–2010), Jack's long-time friend and colleague with whom he shares an office. George is about the same age as Jack but a rank lower. Though he is more cautious, George is steadfastly loyal to Frost. Originally DCI Allen's assistant, he is later partnered with Frost on many occasions. In the first novel his name was George Martin, but as 'Toolan' he was retained for the series. He is known to have a wife, Mary, who confronts Frost after George is injured by falling from a flight of stairs. He was one of only three characters who stayed with the show until its demise and was the only permanent cast member to be killed off in the show's history.
- Hazel Wallace (Caroline Harker, 1992–2003) is a young, happy-go-lucky uniformed officer. In the first novel, she was originally named Hazel Page and did not appear in any subsequent books, replaced in succession by other female officers, but was retained in the series for continuity.
- Clive Barnard (Matt Bardock, 1992; 1995–1997) was the nephew of the Chief Constable and newly promoted into CID when he first meets Frost. Most people believe he has got into CID only through his family connections, but Frost sees beyond that and takes Barnard under his wing.
- Sandy Gilmore (Tony Haygarth, 1992) is a chain-smoking copper of the 80s, who is seconded to Denton CID to cover the number of officers on sick leave. Although he inappropriately tries to smoke in the houses of people he is interviewing and gets a reprimand, Frost begins to like his instinctive, proactive sense of policing.
- Maureen Lawson (Sally Dexter, 1994; 2003) is a strong-willed, hardworking gay detective who sometimes lets her personal judgement get in the way. She left divisional CID after a burglary victim was stabbed by her jealous lover. She later returned to help Frost investigate the murder of a local businessman.
- Frank Nash (Neil Stuke, 1996) is a young, hardworking officer who, after a move to Denton from London, is trying to settle down with his wife and start a family.
- Rab Prentice (Russell Hunter, 1996) is an old-fashioned, laidback Scottish detective due for retirement. His constant bemoaning of sex and relationships, and repeated remarks to Frost about old age, easily rile the inspector.
- Liz Maud (Susannah Doyle, 1997) is an ambitious, high-flying detective who transferred to Denton from the West End.
- Billy "Razor" Sharpe (Philip Jackson, 1999; 2005) is nicknamed "Razor" because he's not very sharp. However, Frost rates him because he's a "plodder" who is methodical in his work.
- Bill Dorridge (Paul Jesson, 1999–2000) is an amiable, by-the-book detective with experience in most investigative sections, especially liking commercial fraud.
- Terry Reid (Robert Glenister, 2001–2003) is a tough London detective who has suffered from alcohol and drug addictions. He has often been in trouble for his extreme methods, though he has mellowed by the time he works with Frost.
- Annie Marsh (Cherie Lunghi, 2008) is a hardworking detective from Manchester who is not keen on Frost's methods of cutting corners and bending the rules to get a result.

=== Detective constables ===
- Vic Webster (George Anton, 1992) is briefly Frost's partner.
- Carl Tanner (Lennie James, 1994) is a black officer seconded to support Frost with investigations into a murder and burglaries within a black majority area of Denton. Appointed by Mullett purely for public relations, Tanner nonetheless proves himself as an able, dedicated officer.
- Martin Costello (Neil Dudgeon, 1994) is an unpopular officer with a negative perception of him when he becomes Frost's partner. This is due to Costello being reassigned to Denton CID after punching a DCI in his former unit.
- Giles (Sarah Kirkman, 2003) is an officer protecting trial witness Cathy Thompson, as Cathy awaits to testify against gangland villain Jack Flynn.
- Chandler (Robert Horwell, 2003) is an officer protecting trial witness Cathy Thompson.

=== Uniformed officers ===
- PC Ernie Trigg (Arthur White, 1994–2010), the police archivist. He helps Frost with knowledge of known associates and crime methods he has collected over the years that are not available in the police computer system. He and Frost knew each other long before they were stationed at Denton.
- Sgt Alan Hadley (Sean Blowers, 2003) is a senior firearms officer overseeing a manhunt for gangland hitman Gary Tinley.
- WPC Claire Toms (Colette Brown, 1996) serves as Frost's partner when recovering a kidnap victim held to ransom. With training in kidnap recovery and hostage negotiation, Toms proves to be a useful and capable partner despite her youth and junior rank.
- PC Craven (Ian Mercer, 1996), a patrol officer Frost encounters a few times during investigations.
- WPC Lindsey Hunter (Katrina Levon, 1996) is temporarily seconded into CID to support Frost's investigation of an assault on a student at Denton University.
- WPC Holland (Miranda Pleasence, 1997–1999) attracts Frost's ire during an investigation into an elderly woman murdering her husband.
- WPC Ronnie Lonnegan (Michelle Joseph, 2002) a black female officer, is temporarily assigned to CID to support Frost when Denton station is under inspection.
- WPC Tracy Miller (Daniele Lydon, 2003) is assigned to protect Cathy Thompson and her son Robbie, as Cathy is a key witness in a major murder trial against gangland criminal Jack Flynn.
- PC Kenny Russell (Stuart Bowman, 2003) is an armed response officer, working on the manhunt for Gary Tinley, a gangland hitman.

=== Other service personnel ===
- Sandy Longford (Bill Stewart, 1992–1999), Denton Evening News journalist who has a longstanding love–hate relationship with Frost, since each party is often either useful or a nuisance to the other.
- Captain Carlisle (Ralph Brown, 1996), a member of the Royal Military Police and Special Investigation Branch forced to partner with Frost during an investigation into the murder of a Territorial Army volunteer.
- Eileen Cleary (Helen Masters, 2003) is a solicitor with the CPS assigned to the trial of gangland villain Jack Flynn. Cleary strikes up a rapport with key witness Cathy Thompson, but Terry Reid views Cleary negatively after previous experiences.
- Martine Phillips (Sara Stewart, 2005), is a criminal profiler assigned to help Denton CID investigate the brutal murder of a mother.
- Christine Moorhead (Phyllis Logan, 2010), an RSPCA officer who works with Jack to help crack his final case.

=== Romantic interests ===
- Shirley Fisher (Lindy Whiteford, 1992–2000), the nurse who cared for Jack's terminally ill wife. She later develops a relationship with Jack.
- Rosalie Martin (Isla Blair, 1996–1997) is a widow who encounters Frost when he investigates the murder of a gigolo.
- Kitty Rayford (Gwyneth Powell, 1997), an ex-prostitute whom Jack knew in her youth.
- Dr. Pam Hartley (Susan Penhaligon, 2002) is a criminal profiler who Jack meets at a training course.

== Production ==
The series is based on the novels of R. D. Wingfield:

- Frost at Christmas (1984)
- A Touch of Frost (1987)
- Night Frost (1992)
- Hard Frost (1995)
- Winter Frost (1999)
- A Killing Frost (2008)

Due to their length, many of the other books were split into multiple episodes. "A Touch of Frost" was split over three episodes. "Night Frost" was split over two (although the element of DS Gilmore's marriage break-up was used in the series 4 episode "The Things We Do for Love", which has no other reference to "Night Frost", for the series-only character of DS Nash). "Hard Frost" was the last and perhaps most closely referenced novel filmed, which was split across two almost unrelated episodes. Despite the show still being produced when the last two novels were written, they were never used as source material for episodes, possibly due to their more graphic subject matter.

The saxophone solo heard during the show's theme music was performed by Barbara Thompson.

From series 1 through to 5, the series was originally shown and transferred to DVD in the 4:3 aspect ratio (then mostly the UK television norm in the 1990s). From series 6 onwards, the show was shown in a widescreen 16:9 aspect ratio. The DVD releases reflected this change. From 2012 on, ITV3 HD broadcast a growing number of episodes of the series in high definition, remastered from the original 16mm source. To do that, the frame has been "opened-up" to include previously unseen parts of the frame.

The Denton Police Station of early seasons was filmed in an industrial complex at the intersection of Burley Road and Westfield Road in Leeds. Various other locations have been used throughout the series for the police station. Seacroft Hospital in Leeds and Pontefract General Infirmary in Pontefract were used as the 'Denton' Hospital. The exterior of Wakefield Train Station was used for exterior shots of Denton Train Station. The now closed courts in Dewsbury Town Hall, Dewsbury were often used for court scenes.

== Reception ==
Reviewing in The Guardian at the series finale, Nancy Banks-Smith wrote, "Tragedians can play tragedy, but comedians can play anything. David Jason, never cut out by nature to be a copper, has been exceptional as Frost. Well up there with Poirot, Morse and Columbo."

== International broadcast ==
In Australia, the series aired on ABC, UK.TV and 7Two. In Canada, the series aired on Knowledge, SCN and TVOntario. In New Zealand, the series aired on Prime, TV1 and UK.TV. In the United States, the series aired on A&E Network. In the Netherlands, the series aired on KRO, while in Italy on La7. Other countries that have aired the series include Belgium, Croatia, Denmark, Finland, France, Japan, Norway and Sweden.

In Ireland, the series originally aired on RTÉ, but was later dropped by RTÉ in the early 2000s and was not acquired by TV3 Ireland (which was then part owned by ITV, until 2006); however, with the introduction of UTV Ireland in 2015, the series made a return and has aired across all Virgin Media channels (formerly TV3) since UTV Ireland's takeover in 2017.

== DVD releases ==
Title	Episodes	Region 1	Region 2	Region 4
The Complete First Series	3	30 March 2004	18 October 2004	4 August 2008
The Complete Second Series	4	25 May 2004	18 October 2004	3 November 2008
The Complete Third Series	4	28 July 2004	18 October 2004	3 November 2008
The Complete Fourth Series	5	23 November 2004	18 October 2004	2 February 2009
The Complete Fifth Series	4	29 March 2005	18 October 2004	2 February 2009
The Complete Sixth Series	4	28 June 2005	18 October 2004	1 May 2009
The Complete Seventh Series	2	27 September 2005	18 October 2004	1 May 2009
The Complete Eighth Series	2	27 September 2005	18 October 2004	1 May 2009
The Complete Ninth Series	2	25 April 2006	18 October 2004	26 June 2009
The Complete Tenth Series	3	25 April 2006	18 October 2004	26 June 2009
The Complete Eleventh Series	2	31 October 2006	21 November 2005	31 July 2009
The Complete Twelfth Series	1	31 October 2006	21 November 2005	31 July 2009
The Complete Thirteenth Series	1	29 April 2008	6 November 2006	31 July 2009
The Complete Fourteenth Series	3	28 July 2009	27 October 2008	8 June 2010
The Complete Fifteenth Series	2	30 November 2010	12 April 2010	8 December 2010
The Complete Series 1–5	20	—N/a	18 October 2004	27 November 2009
The Complete Series 6–10	13	—N/a	18 October 2004	—N/a
The Complete Series 6–15	22	—N/a	16 August 2010	—N/a
The Complete Series 1–15	42	—N/a	15 August 2011	9 December 2015

== Prequel series ==
Free @ Last TV, who produced the Sky One/Acorn TV series Agatha Raisin, are developing a prequel series, based on the novel First Frost, published in 2011 by Transworld Publishers Ltd.
