= Night Frost =

1992 novel by R. D. Wingfield

- First edition
- Author: R. D. Wingfield
- Language: English
- Series: A Touch of Frost
- Genre: Mystery novel
- Publisher: Constable
- Publication date: 1992
- Publication place: United Kingdom
- Media type: Print (Hardback & Paperback); Audio Book
- Pages: 432 pp (first edition, hardback)
- ISBN: 0-09-470960-2 (first edition, hardback)
- OCLC: 24792026
- Preceded by: A Touch of Frost
- Followed by: Hard Frost

Night Frost is a novel by R. D. Wingfield in the popular series featuring Detective Inspector Jack Frost, coarse, crude, slapdash – and holder of the George Cross. The novel was filmed for the ITV detective series A Touch of Frost.

== Release details ==
- 1992, UK, Constable (ISBN 0-09-470960-2), Pub date ? March 1992, hardback (First edition)
- 1992, UK, Corgi Books (ISBN 0-552-13985-8), Pub date ? December 1992, paperback
- 1995, USA, Crimeline, Bantam Books (ISBN 0-553-57167-2), Pub date ? May 1995, paperback
- 1998, UK, ISIS Audio Books (ISBN 0-7531-0316-8), Pub date ? March 1998, audio book (Complete & Unabridged)
