= R. D. Wingfield =

English author and radio dramatist

- Born: Rodney David Wingfield; 6 June 1928; Hackney, London, England
- Died: 31 July 2007 (aged 79)
- Occupations: Author, playwright
- Writing career
- Genre: Crime fiction

Rodney David Wingfield (6 June 1928 – 31 July 2007) was an English author and radio dramatist. He is best remembered for creating the character of Detective Inspector Jack Frost, who was later played by David Jason in A Touch of Frost.

== Early life ==
Rodney David Wingfield was born in Hackney, east London in 1928. He was educated at the Coopers' Company School and during the Second World War was evacuated to Frome, Somerset. Wingfield was exempted from National Service due to poor eyesight and had various office jobs in the East End before joining the Petrofina oil company. His first radio play, Our West Ladyton Branch was accepted by the BBC in 1968 and two more were then commissioned, at which point Wingfield resigned from his job.

== Inspector Frost ==
In 1972, Macmillan Publishers invited him to write a book, and he wrote Frost at Christmas. This was rejected and not published until the early 1980s in Canada. Wingfield had originally planned to kill Frost in the first book, but he was persuaded instead to leave the ending open. Following this, two more Frost books were written: A Touch of Frost and Night Frost. In 1977 Frost appeared in a radio play called Three Days of Frost, in which Frost was played by Leslie Sands, a friend of Wingfield's. The books were first published in the United Kingdom in early 1989, and in 1992 Frost first appeared on television in A Touch of Frost, played by David Jason. Wingfield was never enthusiastic about the TV adaptation of his detective, once saying he had nothing against David Jason but "he just isn't my Frost".

Hard Frost was published in 1995, followed by Winter Frost in 1999. Wingfield did not enjoy writing books, and much preferred writing radio scripts. In 20 years he wrote over 40 radio mystery plays, but stopped in 1988, with Hate Mail, due to the decline of radio and the success of his Frost books. As well as the many mystery plays, Wingfield also penned a comedy radio series, The Secret Life of Kenneth Williams, starring Kenneth Williams as a secret agent. Wingfield was a very private man, always avoiding book launches and publishing parties, and being rarely photographed.

== Other ==
In 1982, Leslie Sands played Sergeant Fowler in Wingfield's BBC radio thriller Outbreak of Fear, a murder mystery set in the West Country.

In 1987, Bob Peck starred in the Wingfield BBC radio drama Deadfall, about a demolition man whose past catches up with him.

The 'winkle' postcard (sent by Inspector Frost) is most probably based on a Donald McGill seaside postcard.

After a dispute with the BBC in 1984 he submitted a number of radio plays under the pseudonym "Arthur Jefferson", (the real name of Stan Laurel) one such play being The Killing Season broadcast in six parts that same year and starring Sean Barrett, Michael Jenner, John Hollis, and Allan Cuthbertson; the serial was essentially a palimpsest of his earlier serial Outbreak of Fear. The final of his non-Inspector Frost radio plays was Hate Mail broadcast in 1988.

== Later years ==
In 2002, R. D. Wingfield was diagnosed with prostate cancer. At about the same time he started writing the sixth, and final, Frost book, A Killing Frost. His wife, Phyllis Patten, whom he married in 1952, died in 2004. They had a son, Phillip. Wingfield died from cancer in 2007, and A Killing Frost was published posthumously on 7 April 2008.

In 2011, the first of four new Frost books was published with the approval of the Wingfield family. The books – First Frost, Fatal Frost, Morning Frost, and Frost at Midnight – are published under the name James Henry. In the case of First Frost, this pseudonym refers to James Gurbutt and Henry Sutton, but for the others it refers to Gurbutt only. All the books are now available in ebook format.

== Bibliography ==
=== Inspector Frost novels ===
- Frost at Christmas (1984)
- A Touch of Frost (1987)
- Night Frost (1992)
- Hard Frost (1995)
- Winter Frost (1999)
- A Killing Frost (2008)
