= List of comedy films of the 1970s =

This is a list of comedy films released in the 1970s.

== 1970s ==
1970

- The Boatniks
- Catch-22
- The Cheyenne Social Club
- The Computer Wore Tennis Shoes
- Doctor in Trouble
- Hi, Mom!
- Hoffman
- How Do I Love Thee?
- Kelly's Heroes
- Little Big Man
- M*A*S*H
- Myra Breckinridge
- The Out-of-Towners
- The Owl and the Pussycat
- Start the Revolution Without Me
- There's a Girl in My Soup
- The Twelve Chairs
- There Was a Crooked Man...
- Which Way to the Front?

1971

- Dollars
- 200 Motels
- And Now For Something Completely Different
- Bananas
- The Barefoot Executive
- Bedknobs and Broomsticks
- B.S. I Love You
- The Battle of Love's Return
- Bunny O'Hare
- Carnal Knowledge
- Drive, He Said
- Happy Birthday, Wanda June
- Harold and Maude
- The Hospital
- How to Frame a Figg
- Melody
- The Million Dollar Duck
- Mrs. Pollifax-Spy
- A New Leaf
- Plaza Suite
- Scandalous John
- The Skin Game
- Such Good Friends
- Support Your Local Gunfighter!
- Taking Off
- They Might Be Giants
- Who Is Harry Kellerman and Why Is He Saying Those Terrible Things About Me?
- Willy Wonka & the Chocolate Factory

1972

- Another Nice Mess
- Avanti!
- Bluebeard
- Butterflies Are Free
- Cancel My Reservation
- The Candidate
- Come Back, Charleston Blue
- Everything You Always Wanted to Know About Sex* (*But Were Afraid to Ask)
- Every Little Crook and Nanny
- Fuzz
- Fritz the Cat
- Get to Know Your Rabbit
- Hammersmith Is Out
- The Heartbreak Kid
- The Honkers
- The Hot Rock
- The Life and Times of Judge Roy Bean
- Now You See Him, Now You Don't
- Pete 'n' Tillie
- Pink Flamingos
- Play It Again, Sam
- Pocket Money
- Pulp
- Slaughterhouse-Five
- Snoopy Come Home
- Snowball Express
- The Thing with Two Heads
- To Find a Man
- Travels with My Aunt
- The War Between Men and Women
- What's Up, Doc?
- Where Does It Hurt?
- With Children at the Seaside

1973

- 40 Carats
- American Graffiti
- Blume in Love
- Charley and the Angel
- Class of '44
- Cops and Robbers
- Five on the Black Hand Side
- Harry in Your Pocket
- The House in Nightmare Park
- Kid Blue
- The Last Detail
- The Naked Ape
- Oklahoma Crude
- One Little Indian
- The Paper Chase
- Paper Moon
- Shamus
- Sleeper
- Slither
- Soft Beds, Hard Battles
- Steelyard Blues
- The Sting
- Superdad
- The Thief Who Came to Dinner
- The Train Robbers
- The World's Greatest Athlete

1974

- Blazing Saddles
- Dark Star
- Down and Dirty Duck
- Flesh Gordon
- Ginger in the Morning
- The Girl from Petrovka
- The Great McGonagall
- The Groove Tube
- Harry and Tonto
- Herbie Rides Again
- The Longest Yard
- Man About the House
- The Nine Lives of Fritz the Cat
- Phantom of the Paradise
- Rhinoceros
- The Thorn
- Thunderbolt and Lightfoot
- Uptown Saturday Night
- Young Frankenstein

1975

- Aaron Loves Angela
- The Adventure of Sherlock Holmes' Smarter Brother
- The Apple Dumpling Gang
- At Long Last Love
- The Black Bird
- Blazing Stewardesses
- Cooley High
- Crazy Mama
- Dolemite
- Fore Play
- Funny Lady
- The Fortune
- Hearts of the West
- It Seemed Like a Good Idea at the Time
- Let's Do It Again
- Lisztomania
- Love and Death
- Lucky Lady
- Monty Python and the Holy Grail
- Moonrunners
- One of Our Dinosaurs Is Missing
- Peeper
- The Prisoner of Second Avenue
- Rancho Deluxe
- The Return of the Pink Panther
- The Rocky Horror Picture Show
- Rooster Cogburn
- Shampoo
- Sheila Levine Is Dead and Living in New York
- Sixpack Annie
- Smile
- The Strongest Man in the World
- The Sunshine Boys
- Whiffs
- W.W. and the Dixie Dancekings

1976

- Adiós Amigo
- The Bad News Bears
- The Big Bus
- The Bingo Long Traveling All-Stars & Motor Kings
- Cannonball
- Car Wash
- Chesty Anderson, USN
- Confessions of a Driving Instructor
- Confessions of a Pop Performer
- Confessions of a Window Cleaner
- The Duchess and the Dirtwater Fox
- Family Plot
- The First Nudie Musical
- Freaky Friday
- The Gumball Rally
- Gus
- Harry and Walter Go to New York
- Keep It Up Downstairs
- Mother, Jugs & Speed
- Murder by Death
- Network
- Nickelodeon
- No Deposit, No Return
- Norman... Is That You?
- The Pink Panther Strikes Again
- The Ritz
- The Shaggy D.A.
- Silent Movie
- Silver Streak
- Tunnel Vision

1977

- Annie Hall
- The Bad News Bears in Breaking Training
- The Billion Dollar Hobo
- Candleshoe
- The Chicken Chronicles
- Confessions from a Holiday Camp
- Desperate Living
- Fun with Dick and Jane
- The Goodbye Girl
- Grand Theft Auto
- The Happy Hooker Goes to Washington
- Handle with Care
- Herbie Goes to Monte Carlo
- High Anxiety
- Jabberwocky
- The Kentucky Fried Movie
- The Last Remake of Beau Geste
- The Late Show
- Mr. Billion
- Oh, God!
- A Piece of the Action
- Semi-Tough
- Slap Shot
- Smokey and the Bandit
- Thieves
- Thunder and Lightning
- Which Way Is Up?
- The World's Greatest Lover

1978

- A Wedding
- Almost Summer
- The Bad News Bears Go to Japan
- The Big Fix
- California Suite
- The Cat from Outer Space
- The Cheap Detective
- Corvette Summer
- Every Which Way But Loose
- Foul Play
- Goin' South
- The Great Bank Hoax
- Harper Valley PTA
- Heaven Can Wait
- Here Come the Tigers
- Hooper
- Hot Lead and Cold Feet
- Loose Shoes
- Movie Movie
- National Lampoon's Animal House
- Rabbit Test
- Revenge of the Pink Panther
- Sextette
- Sgt. Pepper's Lonely Hearts Club Band
- Somebody Killed Her Husband
- Thank God It's Friday
- They Went That-A-Way & That-A-Way
- The End
- Up in Smoke
- Who Is Killing the Great Chefs of Europe?

1979

- 10
- 1941
- Americathon
- The Apple Dumpling Gang Rides Again
- Being There
- Breaking Away
- The Bugs Bunny/Road Runner Movie
- The Electric Horseman
- Fast Break
- The Fish That Saved Pittsburgh
- The Frisco Kid
- Hot Stuff
- The In-Laws
- The Jerk
- Love at First Bite
- Lovers and Liars
- The Main Event
- Manhattan
- Monty Python's Life of Brian
- The Muppet Movie
- The North Avenue Irregulars
- North Dallas Forty
- A Perfect Couple
- The Plank (1979) — remake of the 1967 film
- Porridge (1979)
- The Prisoner of Zenda
- The Prize Fighter
- Real Life
- Richard Pryor: Live in Concert
- Rock 'n' Roll High School
- Scavenger Hunt
- Starting Over
- The Villain

== 1970s British films ==
- And Now For Something Completely Different (1971)
- Bless This House (1972)
- Confessions from a Holiday Camp (1977)
- Confessions of a Driving Instructor (1976)
- Confessions of a Pop Performer (1976)
- Confessions of a Window Cleaner and other sex comedies supported by the Eady levy
- Dad's Army (1971)
- Doctor in Trouble (1970)
- Hoffman (1970)
- The House in Nightmare Park (1973)
- Jabberwocky (1977)
- Keep It Up Downstairs (1976)
- The Likely Lads (1976)
- Man About the House (1974)
- Melody (1971)
- Monty Python and the Holy Grail (1975)
- Monty Python's Life of Brian (1979)
- On the Buses (1972) (and two sequels)
- The Pink Panther Strikes Again (1976)
- The Plank (1979) — remake of the 1967 film
- Porridge (1979)
- Pulp (1972)
- The Return of the Pink Panther (1974)
- Soft Beds, Hard Battles (1973)
- Steptoe and Son (1972) and sequel Steptoe and Son Ride Again
- There's a Girl in My Soup (1970)
- Up the Chastity Belt (1972)
- Up the Front (1972)
- Up Pompeii! (1971)

== Comedy-horror ==
1971

- The Abominable Dr. Phibes

1972

- Children Shouldn't Play with Dead Things
- Dr. Phibes Rises Again
- The Gore Gore Girls
- Please Don't Eat My Mother
- Private Parts

1973

- Theatre of Blood
- The Werewolf of Washington

1974

- The Cars That Ate Paris

1975

- The Rocky Horror Picture Show

1976

- Murder By Death

1977

- House

1978

- Piranha

1979

- Love at First Bite

== Comedy-drama ==
- Diary of a Mad Housewife (1970)
- Carnal Knowledge (1971)
- The Longest Yard (1974)
- Female Trouble (1975)
- One Flew Over the Cuckoo's Nest (1975)
- Cannonball (1976)
- Don's Party (1976)
- The Judge and the Assassin (1976)
- Convoy (1978)
- Autumn Marathon (1979) (USSR)
- Breaking Away (1979)

== Parody films ==
- Blazing Saddles (1974)
- Hardware Wars (1977)
- High Anxiety (1977)
- Monty Python and the Holy Grail (1970s)
- Young Frankenstein (1970s)
