= Barratt Waugh =

British countertenor singer

Barratt Waugh (born August 1979, Swindon, Wiltshire) is a British countertenor singer.

== Career ==
Waugh first came to the UK's attention when featured on Michael Barrymore's My Kind of People and My Kind of Music, and went on to perform at the Royal Albert Hall supporting Cliff Richard.

Having been signed to the Warner Bros. Records classics subsidiary Erato, Waugh's album, a collaboration with Diane Warren, I Love You, Goodbye was released in Japan, France and the US in 2000. 50,000 copies were sold, with Barratt making promotional appearances in these countries. In the US, Atlantic Records picked up on the track "A Time for Us" and released a club version.

In 2002, Waugh first underwent brain surgery to remove an abscess and started writing his own material. There were to be several repeat operations to cure the problem.

Waugh released the single "Skip a Beat" in June 2003 under his own label, BNW Records. It reached No. 56 in the UK Singles Chart. During this time Waugh went on a 100 date nationwide schools tour; appearing with Blue, D-Side, Liberty X, Lulu, Fast Food Rockers, Lisa Scott Lee, Blazin' Squad, Sugababes, Kym Marsh, Gareth Gates and others. He has since appeared at Live & Loud in Hampden Park, Summer Pops in Liverpool, the Blackburn Music Festival, Party in the Park and Heaven, as well as numerous nightclubs and radio roadshows across the country.
