= 5th National Television Awards =

British awards ceremony in 1999

- Date: 26 October 1999
- Location: Royal Albert Hall, London
- Country: United Kingdom
- Presented by: Various
- Hosted by: Trevor McDonald
- Website: http://www.nationaltvawards.com/

Television/radio coverage
- Network: ITV

The 5th National Television Awards ceremony was held at the Royal Albert Hall on 26 October 1999 and was hosted by Sir Trevor McDonald.

== Awards ==
Category	Winner	Also nominated
Most Popular Actor	John Thaw (Goodnight Mister Tom)	Joe Absolom (EastEnders); Steven Arnold (Coronation Street); Robson Green (Grafters); David Jason (A Touch of Frost)
Most Popular Actress	Amanda Burton (Silent Witness)	Lisa Riley (Emmerdale); Thora Hird (Lost for Words); Pam Ferris (Where the Heart Is); Julie Hesmondhalgh (Coronation Street)
Most Popular Drama	Goodnight Mister Tom (ITV)	The Bill (ITV); A Touch of Frost (ITV); Where the Heart Is (ITV)
Most Popular Serial Drama	Coronation Street (ITV)	Brookside (Channel 4); EastEnders (BBC One); Emmerdale (ITV)
Most Popular Talk Show	Parkinson (BBC One)	Des O'Connor Tonight (ITV); So Graham Norton (Channel 4); The Frank Skinner Show (BBC)
Most Popular Entertainment Programme	Stars in Their Eyes (ITV)	An Audience with the Bee Gees (ITV); Michael Barrymore's My Kind of Music (ITV); Jim Davidson's Generation Game (BBC One)
Most Popular Entertainment Presenter	Lily Savage	Johnny Vaughan; Michael Barrymore; Jim Davidson
Most Popular Daytime Programme	This Morning (ITV)	Ready Steady Cook (BBC Two); Countdown (Channel 4); Pet Rescue (Channel 4)
Most Popular Factual Entertainment Programme	Animal Hospital (BBC One)	Changing Rooms (BBC One); Antiques Roadshow (BBC One); Ground Force (BBC One)
Most Popular Documentary	Vets in Practice (BBC One)	Airport (BBC One); Children's Hospital (BBC One); Eye of the Storm (ITV)
Most Popular Quiz Programme	Who Wants to Be a Millionaire? (ITV)	Have I Got News for You (BBC Two); Michael Barrymore's Strike It Rich (ITV); They Think It's All Over (BBC One)
Most Popular Comedy Programme	Last of the Summer Wine (BBC One)	Men Behaving Badly (BBC One); Friends (Channel 4/NBC); Birds of a Feather (BBC One)
Most Popular Comedy Performer	Nicholas Lyndhurst (Goodnight Sweetheart)	Pauline Quirke (Maisie Raine); Dawn French (The Vicar of Dibley); Victoria Wood (dinnerladies)
Most Popular Newcomer	Tamzin Outhwaite (EastEnders)	Jack Ryder (EastEnders); Alan Halsall (Coronation Street); Samantha Giles (Emmerdale); Naomi Radcliffe (Coronation Street)
Most Popular Advert	Tesco ("Dotty on bus"; Jane Horrocks and Prunella Scales)	Levi's (Flat Eric); Rolo (Skippy); Budweiser (alligator)
Special Recognition Award	Michael Barrymore	
