= 6th National Television Awards =

British awards ceremony in 2000

- Date: 10 October 2000
- Location: Royal Albert Hall, London
- Country: United Kingdom
- Presented by: Various
- Hosted by: Trevor McDonald
- Website: http://www.nationaltvawards.com/

Television/radio coverage
- Network: ITV

The 6th National Television Awards ceremony was held at the Royal Albert Hall on 10 October 2000 and was hosted by Sir Trevor McDonald.

== Awards ==
Category	Winner	Also nominated
Most Popular Actor	Martin Kemp (EastEnders)	David Jason (A Touch of Frost); Martin Shaw (Always and Everyone); John Thaw (Monsignor Renard); Robson Green (Grafters)
Most Popular Actress	Sarah Lancashire (Seeing Red)	Tamzin Outhwaite (EastEnders); Samantha Giles (Emmerdale); Pam Ferris (Where the Heart Is); Debra Stephenson (Bad Girls)
Most Popular Drama Series	Bad Girls (ITV)	The Bill (ITV); Where the Heart Is (ITV); A Touch of Frost (ITV)
Most Popular Serial Drama	Coronation Street (ITV)	Brookside (Channel 4); EastEnders (BBC One); Emmerdale (ITV)
Most Popular Talk Show	Parkinson (BBC One)	Des O'Connor Tonight (ITV); Jerry Springer UK (ITV); So Graham Norton (Channel 4)
Most Popular Entertainment Programme	Stars in Their Eyes (ITV)	An Audience with Cliff Richard (ITV); My Kind of Music (ITV); This Is Your Life (BBC One)
Most Popular Entertainment Presenter	Michael Barrymore	Jim Davidson; Dale Winton; Davina McCall; Chris Tarrant
Most Popular Daytime Programme	This Morning (ITV)	Neighbours (BBC One/Network Ten); Pet Rescue (Channel 4); Countdown (Channel 4)
Most Popular Factual Entertainment Programme	Animal Hospital (BBC One)	Crimewatch UK (BBC One); Ground Force (BBC One); Walking with Dinosaurs (BBC One)
Most Popular Quiz Programme	Who Wants to Be a Millionaire? (ITV)	Have I Got News for You (BBC Two); A Question of Sport (BBC One); Family Fortunes (ITV)
Most Popular Comedy Programme	The Royle Family (BBC One)	Friends (Channel 4/NBC); The Vicar of Dibley (BBC One); Last of the Summer Wine (BBC One)
Most Popular Comedy Performer	Michael Barrymore (Bob Martin)	Ali G (Da Ali G Show); Brian Conley (The Grimleys); Victoria Wood (dinnerladies); Dawn French (The Vicar of Dibley)
Most Popular Newcomer	Tina O'Brien (Coronation Street)	Charlie Brooks (EastEnders); Clara Salaman (The Bill); Kate McGregor (Emmerdale); Perry Fenwick (EastEnders)
Most Popular Advert	WH Smith (Nicholas Lyndhurst)	PG Tips (monkeys); Budweiser (frogs); Tesco (Jane Horrocks and Prunella Scales)
Special Recognition Award	Chris Tarrant	
