= Greg Smith (film producer) =

British film producer (1939–2009)

- Born: Gregory Ivor Smith; 4 November 1939; Twickenham, London, England
- Died: 19 February 2009 (aged 69)
- Occupation: Film producer
- Spouses: Cheryl Cocklin (divorced); Lynda Bellingham (m. 1975; div. 1976); Valerie Van Ost (divorced); Gloria Thomas (before 2009)

Gregory Ivor Smith (4 November 1939 – 19 February 2009) was a British film producer who had successes in the world of theatre and television.

Smith was born in Twickenham and raised in Laindon by his aunt after his parents died. At the age of 15, Smith joined the Argyle Theatre Touring Company where acting assignments included a stint as an ugly sister in a production of Cinderella. After working as an office boy for Bernard Delfont, and a talent agent for MVA and the Billy Marsh Agency, Smith formed his own talent agency based out of London's Golden Square.

In the late sixties Smith worked as a production associate on two documentary shorts made by Norcon films, Brendan Behan's Dublin (1966) and The London Nobody Knows (1967) beginning a long association and friendship with their director Norman Cohen (1936–1983). With Smith producing and Cohen directing, the two men would go on to make the film adaptation of Spike Milligan's Adolf Hitler: My Part in His Downfall (1973). Smith followed this with the Confessions... series of sex comedy films, with Michael Klinger as the executive producer and Cohen directing all but the first. The series comprises Confessions of a Window Cleaner (directed by Val Guest, 1974), Confessions of a Pop Performer (1975), Confessions of a Driving Instructor (1976) and lastly Confessions from a Holiday Camp (1977). The Confessions series put Smith and Cohen in direct competition with the Carry On series of films. "Things have changed since the Carry-Ons" Smith remarked to Films Illustrated in September 1975: "Humour is more sophisticated, people are more aware. Not that I'm running down the Carry-Ons for one moment. They're one of my favourite types of film, and always have been. But maybe they're a little dated now."

A commercial, but diverse, filmmaker, Smith's other work from this period included producing the glam rock extravaganza Never Too Young to Rock (1976), the documentary The Importance of Being Dublin (1974) and the third film adaptation of The Thirty-Nine Steps (1978). Plans for a 1978 film adaptation of Dennis Potter's Pennies from Heaven (meant to have been produced by Smith for Norfolk International Productions) did not come to fruition, however, nor did plans to make a fifth Confessions film ‘Confessions from a Haunted House’ in 1978.

Smith began turning more to producing for television, including the well-remembered Shillingbury Tales (1980), working in the field until the late 1990s. In 1989 he enjoyed huge success as the co-producer of the hit musical Buddy – the Buddy Holly Story, which ran for twelve years in London's West End.

== Personal life ==
Smith was married four times, first to Cheryl Cocklin, then to actress Lynda Bellingham (1975–76). His third wife Valerie Van Ost, also an actress, worked as casting director on two of his film productions (The Boys in Blue (1982) and Funny Money (1983). Smith married his fourth wife, Gloria Thomas, shortly before he died on 19 February 2009.

== Select credits ==
- Brendan Behan's Dublin (1966)
- The London Nobody Knows (1967)
- Adolf Hitler: My Part in His Downfall (1973)
- Confessions of a Window Cleaner (1974)
- Never Too Young to Rock (1975)
- Confessions of a Pop Performer (1975)
- The Importance of Being Dublin (1975)
- Confessions of a Driving Instructor (1976)
- Confessions from a Holiday Camp (1977)
- Stand Up, Virgin Soldiers (1977)
- The Thirty Nine Steps (1978)
- Rosie Dixon - Night Nurse (1978)
- Tropic (1979)
- ...And the Band Played On (1980)
- Shillingbury Tales (1980)
- Dangerous Davies: The Last Detective (1981)
- Funny Money (1983)
- Stagg's Night (1983)
- The Boys in Blue (1983)
- Cuffy (1983)
- Gabrielle and the Doodleman (1984)
- Prospects (1986)
- Rude Health (1987)
- Theatre Night (1988)
- Great Expectations (1989)
- Othello (1989)
- Porgy and Bess (1992)
- The Old Curiosity Shop (1995)
- Twelfth Night (1996)
- London Suite (1996)
- Larga distancia (1997) - and director
- Animal Farm (1999)
- Agnes Browne (1999)
- David Copperfield (2000)
- Walking with Monsters (2005)
- Before the Dinosaurs (2005)

=== Theatre ===
- Buddy - The Buddy Holly Story (1989)
- Jolson (1995)
- Animal Crackers(1999)
- Great Balls of Fire (2003)
