= Cheryl Barrymore =

English talent manager (1950–2005)

- Born: Cheryl Carlisa Cocklin; 22 March 1950; London, England
- Died: 1 April 2005 (aged 55); St John's Wood, London, England
- Occupations: Dancer, talent manager
- Years active: 1976–2005
- Spouses: Greg Smith; Michael Barrymore (m. 1976; div. 1997)

Cheryl Carlisa Barrymore (née Cocklin; 22 March 1950 – 1 April 2005) was an English dancer and talent manager. From 1976 to 1997, she was married to television presenter Michael Barrymore.

== Biography ==
A trained dancer, Barrymore took work in the publicity department of EMI records between shows, where she met young PR man and lifelong friend Max Clifford. After her first marriage to Greg Smith failed, Barrymore took part in several West End theatre shows, during one of which she met entertainer Michael Barrymore in 1974. They married two years later.

=== Wife and manager ===
Cheryl and Michael married in 1976, although not until after he had paid off his mother, who threatened to reveal a previous 18-month-long gay love affair. She later claimed, without contradiction from her estranged husband, that they had had a "full" marriage, including connubial relations. With Cheryl as Michael's manager and the mastermind behind his meteoric rise, he won a 1979 edition of New Faces. He later became a panelist on Blankety Blank and the warm-up man for Larry Grayson on the Generation Game.

From there Michael rose to fame presenting ITV entertainment show Strike It Lucky from 1986, followed by Kids Say the Funniest Things and My Kind of Music. He was voted the UK's favourite TV star several times, and became one of the highest-paid stars on TV. Cheryl later said that Michael had problems with alcohol, drugs, gambling and depression. As a result of her husband's physical assault on her at the Hotel Bel-Air in Los Angeles, California, she was placed by British police on the "at risk" register.

=== Split with Michael Barrymore ===
At the height of his popularity, Michael Barrymore suffered increasing alcohol problems. He claimed that he had wanted to seek help, but that his wife told him: "No, you’re not (alcoholic). Don't be stupid."

In November 1995, Michael attended the National Television Awards, where, clearly drunk, he made a rambling, incoherent speech. At an after-show party on a live late night radio show, he publicly declared he was gay and "no longer wanted to live a lie", following which he and Cheryl split up. She later claimed that Michael took the step and did not tell her because of his talks with Princess Diana.

After several aborted reunions, they divorced in 1997, and Cheryl went on to publish the autobiography Catch a Falling Star, which contained details of their acrimonious split. The couple became estranged, and she ceased acting on her husband's behalf as either agent or manager.

=== After divorce ===
Cheryl went on to manage other artists, including Rebecca Loos and former EastEnders actress Danniella Westbrook, the latter of whom she urged to get help for her drug addiction, leading to Westbrook becoming temporarily clean of drugs in 2001.

Michael later wrote in his 2006 autobiography, Awight Now: Setting the Record Straight, that Cheryl was a control freak who controlled his every movement including his clothes, and she had created the character that was "Michael Barrymore", which drove him to alcohol, drugs and gay affairs.

=== Death ===
After her split with Michael, Cheryl's health suffered. On 1 April 2005, she died, aged 55, at St John and St Elizabeth Hospital in St John's Wood, having been diagnosed with lung cancer six weeks earlier.
