= Bill Maynard =

English comedian and actor (1928–2018)

- Born: Walter Frederick George Williams; 8 October 1928; Heath End, Surrey, England
- Died: 30 March 2018 (aged 89); Leicestershire, England
- Notable work: See below
- Spouses: Muriel Linnett (m. 1949; died 1983) Tonia Bern (m. 1989; div. 1998)
- Children: 2; including Maynard Williams

Comedy career
- Years active: 1953–2018
- Medium: Actor, comedian
- Genres: Comedy, television

Walter Frederick George Williams (8 October 1928 – 30 March 2018), better known by his stage name Bill Maynard, was an English comedian and actor. He began working in television in the 1950s, notably starring alongside Terry Scott in Great Scott – It's Maynard! (1955–56). In the 1970s and 1980s, he starred in the successful British sitcoms Oh No It's Selwyn Froggitt and The Gaffer and appeared in five films in the Carry On series. After a hiatus from television work in the late 1980s, Maynard starred as Claude Jeremiah Greengrass in the long-running television series Heartbeat from 1992 to 2000, reprising the character in the spin-off The Royal in 2003.

== Early life and career ==
Walter Williams began as a variety performer in the 1950s, under the stage name of Bill Maynard – the surname was inspired from seeing a billboard for the confectionery, Maynard's Wine Gums, when he was to do performances for the BBC. Maynard progressed to repertory theatre, touring army camps with Jon Pertwee. Maynard's first television broadcast was on 12 September 1953 on Henry Hall's Face the Music. For much of his career until the 1970s, his work was mostly towards performances: he entered and placed fourth in the British heat of the 1957 Eurovision Song Contest; he worked alongside Terry Scott for the TV series Great Scott – It's Maynard!, after they worked together at Butlins Holiday Camp in Skegness; and he served as part of the news team on the One O'Clock Show for Tyne Tees Television in Newcastle (1959–64). He also served for BBC Radio Leicester during the 1960s, until his departure in 1968.

In 1971, Maynard entered into acting, securing a role on Dennis Potter's television play Paper Roses, which was about the last day in the life of a reporter, and then securing another role for Colin Welland's television play, Kisses at Fifty in 1973. Around the same year, he worked with television actor and comedian Ronnie Barker in the (original) "Football Blues", which aired as "Spanners Eleven", and was part of a series called Seven of One. In 1974, Maynard became a subject of This Is Your Life, when he was surprised by Eamonn Andrews. Around the same time, Maynard went to work for Yorkshire Television, starring in a pilot episode for a new sitcom. In 1975, he published his autobiography, The Yo-Yo Man, with Leicester's Golden Eagle books. Also in 1975 he appeared in The Sweeney episode Supersnout in which he played Detective Chief Inspector Stephen Quirk of the Metropolitan Police's Flying Squad being the subject of a conspiracy by Joey Stickley, a dirty and weasley informant who attempts to ruin his reputation. After a pilot episode in 1974, Maynard took on the lead role in the sitcom Oh No It's Selwyn Froggitt for three series, followed by its sequel Selwyn for one series, between 1976 and 1978. The Selwyn Froggitt role made Maynard a nationwide household name. In 1980, Maynard appeared in three episodes of Worzel Gummidge as Sergeant Beetroot, alongside long-time friend Jon Pertwee.

In 1981, Maynard starred in three series of the ITV sitcom The Gaffer until its conclusion two years later in 1983. In The Gaffer, Maynard played Fred Moffat, a downbeat, cynical and cunning character focused on survival who runs a struggling engineering firm, and who is constantly trying to avoid his creditors, the tax man, the bank manager, trade unionists at his engineering firm, and indeed seeking to avoid anyone who might want him to pay for something. The character of Fred Moffat was in contrast to the high profile, upbeat, good hearted, bumbling, casual labourer Selwyn Froggitt from his earlier sitcom, with the contrasts between the two including Fred Moffat having a beard and Selwyn Froggitt being clean shaven.

During the 1970s, Maynard secured roles in a number of films: he starred in five of the Carry On films, including Carry On Matron (1972) and Carry On Dick (1974). He starred as Mr. Lea alongside Anthony Booth, Robin Askwith and Doris Hare in all four films in the Confessions series of sex comedies and appeared in the 1976 film It Shouldn't Happen to a Vet.

In April 1992, he returned to Yorkshire Television as lovable rogue Claude Jeremiah Greengrass in Heartbeat, a new ITV drama series set in the 1960s. It was a major success, consistently drawing over 10 million viewers. Maynard published a new book, Stand Up...And Be Counted, in 1997 with Breedon Books. He remained with Heartbeat until December 2000, when he decided to retire from the programme following a series of strokes. Despite this, he returned to acting in 2002 to reprise his character in spin off series The Royal until 2003. Maynard made a comeback to radio in March of that year on BBC Radio Leicester. His programme Bill of Fare aired every Sunday from 2pm to 4pm for nearly five years, until he was dismissed without notice on 5 February 2008.

In October 2009, he made a return to the stage when he appeared as the main guest of honour at the Pride of Bridlington Awards held in the East Riding of Yorkshire. By then, his career slowly wound down due to his age and impaired mobility from his strokes, whereupon his final television appearance was made on 14 April 2018 for an episode of Pointless Celebrities; which aired 15 days after his death.

== Personal life ==
Maynard was born in Farnham, Surrey, whereupon his family moved north to Leicestershire. He was educated at Kibworth Beauchamp Grammar School. Maynard lived in Sapcote, Leicestershire, during the latter part of his life.

Maynard married Muriel Linnett on 5 November 1949, and they had two children. She died in June 1983. He was a vegetarian. His son is musician Martin Maynard Williams.

Maynard was a supporter of the Labour Party, but in March 1984 he stood against Tony Benn in the by-election at Chesterfield as an Independent Labour candidate, after objecting to the way that Benn became the official Labour Party candidate in a safe seat. Maynard took fourth place in the by-election.

On 4 September 1989, Maynard married actress and singer Tonia Bern, the widow of Donald Campbell, at Hinckley Register Office. They divorced in 1998. Bern died on 14 June 2021.

In later life, having suffered multiple strokes which resulted in a reduction in his mobility, he used a scooter or wheelchair. He died in hospital on 30 March 2018, not long after falling and breaking his hip.

== Filmography ==
=== Film ===
Year	Title	Role	Notes
1968	Til Death Us Do Part	Bert	
1969	It All Goes to Show	Mike Sago	
1970	One More Time	Jenson	
1970	Carry On Loving	Mr. Dreery	
1971	A Hole Lot of Trouble	Bill	
1971	Carry On Henry	Guy Fawkes	
1971	Carry On at Your Convenience	Fred Moore	
1972	Carry On Matron	Freddy	
1972	Four Dimensions of Greta	Big Danny	
1972	Bless This House	Oldham	
1972	Carry On Abroad	Mr. Fiddler	Scene cut
1973	Adolf Hitler: My Part in His Downfall	Sgt. Ellis	
1973	Never Mind the Quality Feel the Width	Larkin	
1973	Steptoe and Son Ride Again	George	
1974	Carry On Dick	Bodkin	
1974	Confessions of a Window Cleaner	Mr. Lea	
1974	Man About the House	Chef	
1975	Confessions of a Pop Performer	Mr. Lea	
1976	Robin and Marian	Mercadier	
1976	Confessions of a Driving Instructor	Mr. Lea	
1976	It Shouldn't Happen to a Vet	Hinchcliffe	
1977	Confessions from a Holiday Camp	Mr. Lea	
1977	Sky Pirates	Charlie	
1981	Dangerous Davies: The Last Detective	Mod Lewis	
1982	The Plague Dogs	Editor	Voice
1990	Oddball Hall	Copperthewaite	
1991	Hear My Song	Barry Haden	
2016	Speed Love	Radio DJ	

=== Television ===
Year	Title	Role	Notes
1957	Pantomania: Babes in the Wood	Babe	TV film
1960	No Hiding Place	Vic Wilson	Episode: "The Head Case"
1960	You Too Can Have a Body	Chick Wade	TV film
1969	The Ugliest Girl in Town	Vladimir	Episode: "The Track Star"
1970	Coronation Street	Mickie Malone	5 episodes
1970	Up Pompeii!	Parcantus	Episode: "The Actors"
1971	ITV Sunday Night Theatre	Clarence Hubbard	Episode: "Paper Roses"
1971	Thirty-Minute Theatre	Zink	Episode: "Psychological Warfare"
1972	Sykes	Jim the Policeman	Episode: "Journey"
1972	Til Death Us Do Part	Bert	2 episodes
1973	Comedy Playhouse	Frank Potter	Episode: "Elementary, My Dear Watson: The Strange Case of the Dead Solicitors"
1973	Play for Today	Harry	Episode: Kisses at Fifty
1973	Love Thy Neighbour	Police Sergeant	Episode: "The G.P.O."
1973	Seven of One	Councillor Todd	Episode: "Spanner's Eleven"
1973	Armchair Theatre	Reg Turnbull	Episode: "The Death of Glory"
1974-1978	Oh No It's Selwyn Froggitt	Selwyn Froggitt	Television series
1974	Father Brown	Mr. Carver	Episode: "The Man With Two Beards"
1975	The Life of Riley	Frank Riley	Television series
1975	The Sweeney	Det. Chief Insp. Stephen Quirk	Episode: "Supersnout"
1977	Paradise Island	Rev. Alexander Goodwin	Television series
1980	Worzel Gummidge	Sergeant Beetroot	3 episodes
1980	Tales of the Unexpected	Merv Pottinger	Episode: "A Picture of a Place"
1981-1983	The Gaffer	Fred Moffatt	Television series
1984	Minder	Barney Todd	Episode: "The Second Time Around"
1989	In Sickness and in Health	Bert Luscombe	Christmas Special
1991	Screen One	George Trout	Episode: "Fillipina Dreamgirls"
1992-2000	Heartbeat	Claude Jeremiah Greengrass	Television series (155 episodes)
2002	Dalziel and Pascoe	Councillor Cyril Steel	Episode: "Dialogues of the Dead"
2003	The Royal	Claude Jeremiah Greengrass	Television series (seven episodes)
2017	The Moorside	Cecil	TV film
