= Confessions of a Window Cleaner =

1974 British film by Val Guest

- Theatrical release poster
- Directed by: Val Guest
- Written by: Val Guest; Christopher Wood
- Produced by: Greg Smith, Michael Klinger (executive producer)
- Starring: Robin Askwith; Antony Booth; Linda Hayden; Sheila White; Dandy Nichols; Bill Maynard
- Cinematography: Norman Warwick
- Edited by: Bill Lenny
- Music by: Sam Sklair
- Distributed by: Columbia Pictures
- Release date: 16 August 1974
- Running time: 90 minutes
- Country: United Kingdom
- Language: English
- Budget: £150,000
- Box office: £1,265,954 (distributor gross)

Confessions of a Window Cleaner is a 1974 British sex comedy film, directed by Val Guest.

Like the other films in the Confessions series; Confessions of a Pop Performer, Confessions of a Driving Instructor and Confessions from a Holiday Camp, it concerns the erotic adventures of Timothy Lea, based on the novels written under that name by Christopher Wood. Each film stars actors Robin Askwith and Antony Booth, and several feature actress Linda Hayden, Askwith's long-time girlfriend.

== Plot ==
Timothy "Timmy" Lea is an optimistic but clumsy young man who works alongside his brother-in-law, Sidney "Sid" Noggett, in their window cleaning business. Timmy narrates his day-to-day activities, and he sees many things through the various windows he cleans of houses and big buildings, including many naked women.

Sid and his wife Rosie are expecting their first child, so Sid has employed Timmy to "satisfy" his customers, little realising his bumbling ways and that he is irresistible to women. One day, Timmy meets policewoman Elizabeth "Liz" Radlett, and he is instantly attracted to her. He and Sid go to a social club to watch a burlesque performer, who takes Timmy backstage to have sex with him. During a home window cleaning, Jacqui Brown is overly flirty with Timmy and is bored as her husband is away. Timmy spills liquid detergent and leaves the tap water running, causing an overload of bubbles to fill the kitchen while the pair are having sex.

Later, Timmy meets with Liz again and asks her to the cinema. On another window cleaning job, he winds up having sex with housewife Carole. Timmy often visits his parents, Mr. Lea and Mrs. Lea; Mr. Lea often brings home trinkets and junk he finds at the lost property office. Timmy hangs a moose head that his father has found, but it rips through the wall. During their trip to the movies, Timmy tries to feel up Liz, but she is uninterested in his sexual advances.

Liz's father, Inspector Radlett, is somewhat wary of her daughter's choice of men. On another house visit, Brenda is having sex with Timmy, when they are interrupted by a man he assumes is her husband. He hides under the tiger rug, but it turns out that it was her landlord. On another job, Timmy almost has sex with foreign maid Ingrid, who enjoys yoga, before they are interrupted by her employer, Mrs. Villiers. She then tries to seduce him and gets all dirty in the coal cellar. Next, Timmy ends up having sex with customer Elvie, who pulls out the wall bed, but they are interrupted by her lesbian partner, Ronnie. They have a squabble on the bed before it springs back into the wall with them all on it.

Timmy visits Sid and Rosie, who have given birth to their son, Jason. Later, spending the evening together watching television, Timmy tries again to feel up Liz, but she still rebuffs him. She tells him that she will only make love with the man she marries, and he inadvertently proposes marriage to her. Following this proposal, Liz finally gives in to temptation; they almost have sex, although Timmy is distracted by photos of her parents.

The wedding is arranged, and everyone is dressed up for the big day. But Timmy is knocked unconscious by some removal men and is taken by them on a sofa covered with a sheet in their van. The guests await Timmy's arrival, but the bride turns up before him, and they wait so long that the next wedding is ready to go ahead. When Timmy wakes up and leaves the removal van, he finds himself 60 miles outside London. While he is still missing, the wedding guests are at the reception, not wanting to waste the food. Timmy gets a lift in the back of a boat being towed by a car, but when he arrives at the reception, the guests have already left. Timmy is shocked when he goes home to find Liz being caressed by Sid in the garden outhouse, so he decides to soak them with the hosepipe.

Sid ends up in the hospital with a broken leg, but Timmy forgives him. Timmy gets an apprentice to start window cleaning the following day; Timmy and Liz have broken up, and he goes back to sleeping with other women.

== Cast ==
- Robin Askwith as Timothy Lea
- Tony Booth as Sidney Noggett
- Bill Maynard as Mr Lea
- Dandy Nichols as Mrs Lea
- Sheila White as Rosie Noggett
- Linda Hayden as Elizabeth Radlett
- John Le Mesurier as Inspector Radlett
- Richard Wattis as Carole's father
- Joan Hickson as Mrs Radlett
- Melissa Stribling as Mrs Villiers
- Sam Kydd as 1st Removal Man
- Lionel Murton as Brenda's landlord
- Katya Wyeth as Carole
- Sue Longhurst as Jacqui Brown
- Anita Graham as Ingrid
- Judy Matheson as Elvie
- Brian Hall as 2nd removal man
- Robert Longden as apprentice

== Background ==
The film is essentially an adaptation of a sex novel printed in paperback form. It was adapted for the screen in the 1970s, when the British film industry produced a large number of film adaptations of literary works. Sian Barber cites other examples of this trend: Jane Eyre (1970), Wuthering Heights, Black Beauty (1971), The Go-Between (1971), Kidnapped (1972), Treasure Island (1973), Gulliver's Travels (1977), The Thirty Nine Steps (1978), and The Riddle of the Sands (1979). Sian Barber points out that while adaptations of highbrow and middlebrow material were hardly unusual by the 1970s, Confessions constitutes a rare early adaptation of low brow popular literature.

The series of source novels about Timmy Lea had benefited from a literary forgery, the notion that Lea was not a fictional character but the actual author. The series was a sexual fantasy masquerading as confessional writing, a genre which tends to attract audiences. When novice film producer Greg Smith became interested in adapting the novels to screen, the hoax was maintained and Timmy Lea received credits as the author of the source material. The actual author and screenwriter, Christopher Wood, hardly resembled his creation.

Guest says he was approached by Greg Smith and Michael Klinger to make the film as he had directed Au Pair Girls in 1972. Guest agreed provided if he wrote and directed the first one he would get a percentage of profits for that and any sequels.

Confessions was a low-budget film, with a budget of £100,000, but not really an independent film. Producer Michael Klinger tried to secure funding from independent investors, but most of the funding actually came from Columbia Pictures, a fact telling for its period. The condition of the economy of the United Kingdom in the early 1970s had left part of the British film industry dependent on American funds. Being also released through Columbia, the film was the beneficiary of a marketing campaign. It was promoted through advertisements in television and tie-ins in bookstores.

The film benefited from changes in the culture of the United Kingdom, with an increasingly permissive society and changes in aspects of the censorship standards. Its aesthetics, themes, and characters derive in part from the then-popular genre of the British sitcom. The working class family, as depicted by the Leas, is not much different from its counterparts in On the Buses (1969–1973) and Bless This House (1971–1976). Timmy's father has the habit of collecting discarded items and bringing them home, making him reminiscent of Albert Steptoe from Steptoe and Son (1962–1974). His mother has the habit of buying consumer items on credit, making her reminiscent of Mrs Butler from On the Buses.

Guest says "we saw an awful lot of people for" the lead including Dennis Waterman before casting Robin Askwith. "We needed the cheeky chappie, simply because it had to be gossamer light, walking the tightrope all the time not going over into anything “icky” you know."

This film series also made a point of casting actors already familiar to television audiences. The idea was probably to attract that audience to the cinema. There was a trend at the time for successful sitcoms to be adapted in film, which produced hits such as Dad's Army (1971), On the Buses (1971), Up Pompeii (1971), and Steptoe and Son (1972). The sitcom-like Confessions could probably appeal to the same audience. Leon Hunt, when examining the success of these films, notes their positions in the Top Twenty of the British box office. In 1971, On the Buses was the second greatest hit of the year, following The Aristocats (1970). Up Pompeii was eighth and Dad's Army was 10th. The only other British comedies which surpassed them were There's a Girl in My Soup (1970, fourth in its year) and Percy (fifth). Hunt argues that the Confessions films combined the style of the "sitcom films" with sexploitation. He suggests the terms "sexcom" as the result of this blending of genres.

The interior of the Lea house was depicted as brightly lit and filled with eccentric items of doubtful use, such as a moose head and a gorilla suit. The characters are confined to the "cramped" space of every depicted room, again reminiscent of the sets of a sitcom. The confinement itself suggests claustrophobia, and Sian Barber suggests a connection to another low-budget genre of the time with cramped locations and gaudy scenery: the British horror film.

In criticising the original novels, sociologist Simon Frith had argued that the books derived their unflattering depiction of the British working class from stereotypes. In particular, the stereotypes which the middle class associates for "the great unwashed". Making the series an expression of class discrimination. Sian Barber argues that the films inherited the same attitude towards the working class by embracing negative stereotypes of it. Sidney Noggett and his promiscuity, Rosie and her hair rollers, and the kleptomaniac tendencies of Mr. Lea all derive from these stereotypes. Yet, the films actually tone down the criminal tendencies of the Lea family. In the books, Timmy himself is a former prison convict, having been arrested for stealing the lead off a church roof. In the films, Timmy has no such history, probably in an effort to make him more sympathetic to the audience. Production notes reveal that a sequel called Confessions from the Clink was considered by the production team, but the idea was abandoned by February, 1974.

Part of the humour of the film derives from a situation based on class stratification in the United Kingdom. The Leas are positioned at the bottom of the working class, barely above the criminal underclass, while the Radletts are upper middle class. The romance of Timmy and Elizabeth across the wide class divide serves to showcase both positions, and contrasts the two families. But the Leas are those depicted as ridiculous in the scenes relating to the aborted wedding, while the Radletts remain respectable.

While the premise of the film would be suitable for a pornographic film, the film focuses less on sexual intercourse and more on associated problems and anxieties. Timmy at first fails to perform, and the film deals with his embarrassment over his sexual inexperience and ineptitude. His sexual encounters are either awkward grappling attempts, or the result of Timmy being seduced and/or dominated by women. This anxiety over the male performance in a sexual relationship is one aspect of the film's humour. Another is a reliance on more traditional elements of a comedy, such as slapstick and characters seen naked by accidental spectators. The sexual acts themselves are typically depicted as "confusing, difficult, and troublesome" throughout the film. A running gag seems to be that Timmy, a cleaner by profession, gets dirtied in several scenes involving sexuality. The implication is that sex itself is a "dirty" activity.

Like the horror films of the 1970s, the film is set in the familiar urban landscape of Great Britain. Its contemporary horror films had largely abandoned the costume drama format of their predecessors and the "careful class distinctions" associated with earlier eras in favor of a contemporary setting. For example, Virgin Witch (1971) and House of Whipcord (1974) are partly set in a modeling agency, Dracula A.D. 1972 (1972) and Frightmare (1974) in nightclubs, Dracula A.D. 1972 and House of Whipcord in house parties, Frightmare in a travelling funfair, and House of Mortal Sin (1975) in an antique shop. The reason for the update in setting was that it allowed for depictions of socially mobile characters, rootless or transient. Adding variety to the social interactions and locations. A variety also embraced in Confessions. For similar reasons, other genres had started depicting people whose work required them to constantly travel, such as a salesman in O Lucky Man! (1973) and a truck driver in Alfie Darling (1975). Confessions manages this by placing Timmy in the fringes of the working world, and interacting with clients of varying backgrounds and eccentricities.

There is a contrast in the film between the character of Timmy and the women with which he interacts. His mannerisms indicate nervousness, hesitancy, clumsiness, and insecurity. While they tend to have a self-confidence which he lacks, they are forceful and proactive sexual partners. Yet these confident women tend to be accessible. The ease with which their clothes are removed underline their availability to Timmy. All but Elizabeth, the "nice girl" whom he cannot really touch. Her clothes are not less revealing, her short skirts showcase her legs and seem to invite his touch. She consequently functions much as a temptress. Yet she does not allow him to touch her beyond a certain point, setting the boundaries in their relationship. It is Timmy's desire for this unobtainable young woman which serves as an important story arc for the film.

Sue Harper and Justin Smith argue that the film can be seen as the initiation of a young man into a world of lustful women and adult sexual pleasure. The entire series of Confessions can be understood as a showcase for a simple notion, the notion that sexual freedom can be achieved by people of all classes and genders.

== Critical reception and impact ==
=== Box office ===
It has been called, "perhaps the best known and most successful British sex film" of the era, and was the top-grossing British film of 1974. In 1988, Guest said: "the cheques, which come from Columbia even now, are unbelievable on the series, because it was sold to Home Box Office, sold all through America... the others [sequels] made money but Confessions of is the blockbuster, it made so much money when it came out here that Columbia for the first time anyone could remember here had to pay Corporation Tax".

=== Sequels ===
As well as its sequels in the Confessions series it spawned another unrelated series of films which began with Adventures of a Taxi Driver (1976). The film made Robin Askwith a star in the UK. When the films were originally released they were regarded as very risqué and essentially soft core pornography, owing to the amount of nudity involved – generally female, with Robin Askwith being the only male shown naked. However the sex scenes themselves are more suggestive than explicit, being essentially played for laughs. Nonetheless, it was not until 1997 that Channel 5 became the first British terrestrial channel to show the entire series of Confessions films.

The film was a popular hit for the British sexploitation genre, while film critics reportedly loathed it and decried it as a "tawdry" and vulgar spectacle. Sian Barber points at this contradiction between the popular taste and the critics' notions of quality, and concludes that it offers significant insights on actual "audience preferences". Preferences shaped by "the tastes, values and frustrated desires of ordinary filmgoers". The film was a box office hit. In a cited example of a cinema in the West End of London, the film was screened for nine weeks, with 29 performances per week, and earning over £30,000. In January 1975, the Eady Levy tax fund estimated that it had raised £200,000 from this film alone. By 1979, profits had exceeded £800,000. Yet, Robin Askwith recalled that film industry opinions were "totally negative" towards the film and dismissive of its success with the public. In retrospect, Leon Hunt concluded that the film benefited from a combination of adult entertainment with "good clean fun", an appealing cast, and the popularity of the source novels.

Guest later reflected, "I think what made Au Pair and Confessions was that I tried to walk a tightrope of skin flick and comedy, we kept it bubbling, we never took anything seriously, it was always sent up, … none of the affairs, the lovemaking or whatever came out that was the only way I'd do those. I said “If you let me send it up.”... Instead of being embarrassed they were laughing at the sex side of it, laughing at the nudity."

=== Critical ===
The Monthly Film Bulletin wrote: "Brassy theme music accompanies what is, at its least dreary, a brassy sub-sexploitation comedy owing a good many of its ideas to Here We Go Round the Mulberry Bush. The humour is of the sniggering, innuendo-squeezing variety and is aimed with unnerving mediocrity at a particular kind Be distinctly British – audience reaction. Like Donner's film, Window Cleaner is angled for a teenage market, presenting a gauche and ineffectual young hero whose lack of success is much emphasised, especially with the almost-untouchable 'girl he loves', and whose eventual successes are elided into farce or fantasy (one smart suburban lady takes him on the kitchen floor, which is knee-deep in foam: sexual contact is only shown in vague long-shot, though we do get a lot of expressive shots of foam. There is a certain energy in the presentaon of the Noggett household, a working class family on traditional Fifties' comedy lines, and here director Val Guest has one or two stabs at a more solid, observational humour. His efforts are inevitably doomed by the context."

Leon Hunt, examining the reviews of the film series, notes some highlights.

Margaret Hinxman, film critic of the Daily Mail, wrote negative and increasingly exasperated reviews for every installment of the Confessions series. She called the original a "puerile sex farce" and compared the rest of them to latrinalia.

Alexander Stuart, writing for the magazine Films and Filming. claimed that the films are a real confession, a confession that the British people cannot properly create films, erotic images, comedy, or anything related to love. The films were unfavourably compared to the Carry On series (1958–1992), which the critics found harmless in comparison.

David Robinson, writing for The Times, claimed that the commercial success of the films was based on the sexual infantilism of the viewers.

Virginia Dignam, writing for the Morning Star, offered positive reviews of the film series.
