= Walter McCorrisken =

Scottish poet (1926–2004)

- Born: 28 May 1926
- Died: 29 January 2004 (aged 77)
- Writing career
- Language: English
- Genre: Poetry

Walter McCorrisken (28 May 1926 – 29 January 2004) was a Scottish writer, self-styled as the world's worst poet.

== Writing career ==
In the mid 1970s, McCorrisken entered a bad poetry competition organized by The Herald Diary in Glasgow. The competition ran for a month and attracted over 1000 entries from across Scotland. However, 259 of the entries were submitted by McCorrisken. He won the competition and claimed the title of Scotland's worst poet.

McCorrisken's career as a writer extended over three decades while he continued with his day job at Glasgow Airport. He appeared on radio and television and was interviewed by Michael Parkinson and Michael Barrymore.

The style of McCorrisken's writing is described as gentle, self-effacing and parochial humour.

A documentary film about McCorrisken, The Renfrew Rhymer, was made by filmmaker Paul Russell with the assistance of McCorrisken's son Richard. It premiered in June 2020.

== Works ==
- Come back again, hen: a Silver Jubilee poem (1977)
- Cream of the dross (1979)
- Cream of the crackers (1980)
- Cream of the corn (1981)
- Cream of the crop (1982)
- More Punishing Poems from Walter McCorrisken – Scotland's Worst Poet (1984)
- Porridge in my pibroch (1994) audiobook
- Tadpoles in tenements : trials of a taxidermist (1997)
- A Wee Dribble of Dross (1998)
- Hairy Knees and Heather Hills (1998)
