= Sheila White (actress) =

British film, television and stage actress (1948–2018)

- White in I, Claudius (1976)
- Born: Sheila Susan White; 18 October 1948; London, England
- Died: 7 September 2018 (aged 69); Kingston, London, England
- Occupation: Actress
- Years active: 1966–2000
- Television: EastEnders
- Spouse: Richard M. Mills (m. 1983) Francisco Martinez Montes (m. 1973–1980)
- Children: 5

Sheila Susan White (18 October 1948 – 7 September 2018) was an English film, television and stage actress.

== Early life and career ==
Sheila White was born in London. She began her career at the age of 12 as a member of Terry's Juveniles in the pantomime Cinderella at the Golders Green Hippodrome, starring Arthur Askey. This led to three years in the London production of The Sound of Music at the Palace Theatre, playing firstly Brigitta and then Louisa von Trapp. She then became a student at the Corona Stage School in Hammersmith, West London.

White made her television debut at the age of sixteen in an episode of The Wednesday Play with Geraldine McEwan in 1965. A theatre tour of Counter Crime followed, then the musical tour of The Roar of the Greasepaint—the Smell of the Crowd starring Norman Wisdom and Willoughby Goddard, written by Leslie Bricusse and Anthony Newley in which she played one of the urchins alongside Elaine Paige, with choreography by Gillian Lynne.

White's major break came playing the part of Eileen in the musical On the Level at the Saville Theatre. She was taken out of the chorus and the song "Bleep – Bleep" was written especially for her as a solo feature. This led to her being cast as Bet, Nancy's best friend in the film version of Lionel Bart's musical Oliver! (1968). She accompanied Shani Wallis as Nancy and Mark Lester as Oliver in the songs "It's a Fine Life" and "I'd Do Anything".

Following her appearance in Oliver!, she briefly settled in France recording pop songs, performing in cabaret and making television appearances. She also starred in the French film Papa the Little Boats (Papa les p'tits bateaux, 1971) directed by Nelly Kaplan.

== Film and television ==
In 1969 and 1970, White starred opposite Rodney Bewes in the first two series of the sitcom Dear Mother...Love Albert. She received glowing reviews for her performance as Messalina, the third wife of the Emperor Claudius (Derek Jacobi) in the BBC classic serial I, Claudius (1976), and in EastEnders she played Carol Hanley, the biological mother of Sharon Watts (Letitia Dean).

Her many other television credits include the TV musical Pickwick for the BBC in 1969, Keren Daniel in Poldark for BBC TV, Annie Miller in The Brotherhood – Pre-Raphaelites – Aka Love School for the BBC directed by Piers Haggard. Dixie, the female lead in the comedy series Don't Rock the Boat for Thames Television directed by Mark Stuart, Moyra Sheffield in Framed for ITV, written by Lynda La Plante, Sharon Nightingale in the series 1 episode Monday Night Fever of Minder, Mildred in ITV Saturday Night Theatre – The Funeral of Queen Victoria, directed by Tania Leven, Whizzkid's Guide a children's comedy series for Anglia Television, and Faith in the series Gone To Seed. Musical appearances on television included the variety series The Songwriters, several Royal Variety shows, and The Good Old Days with Leonard Sachs. She made her final TV appearance in an episode of the comedy series A Many Splintered Thing (2000) with Alan Davies.

Her 1970s film appearances included the role of Rosie Noggett, sister of Timothy Lea (Robin Askwith), in all four Confessions films, Villain (1971) with Richard Burton, Alfie Darling (1975) with Joan Collins, Silver Dream Racer (1980) with David Essex, and the Walt Disney comedy Unidentified Flying Oddball (1979).

== Theatre ==
White's extensive theatre credits as a West End leading lady included Mary Pickford in The Biograph Girl for Harold Fielding, directed by Victor Spinetti; Eileen Wells in On the Level; Young Belle in Little Me; Ruby in the London production of Dames at Sea; Samantha in Queen Daniella with Danny La Rue and Sonia Walsk; and the British production of They're Playing Our Song.

== Personal life and death ==
Between 1967 and 1970 White was in a relationship with Alan Whitehead, the drummer of chart-topping group Marmalade. Although engaged for two years they never married.

White became semi-retired after her marriage to (then) theatre producer Richard M. Mills in 1983. The couple had two sons.

Following a long illness, she died of heart failure on 7 September 2018 at age 69.

== Filmography ==
- The Ghost Goes Gear (1966) as Polly
- Stranger in the House (1967) as Hazel
- Here We Go Round the Mulberry Bush (1967) as Paula
- Mrs. Brown, You've Got a Lovely Daughter (1968) as Tulip
- Oliver! (1968) as Bett
- Villain (1971) as Veronica
- Papa les p'tits bateaux (1972) as Venus "Cookie" De Palma
- Confessions of a Window Cleaner (1974) as Rosie
- Alfie Darling (1975) as Norma
- Confessions of a Pop Performer (1975) as Rosie
- Confessions of a Driving Instructor (1976) as Rosie
- I, Claudius (TV, 1976) as Messalina
- Confessions from a Holiday Camp (1977) as Rosie
- Unidentified Flying Oddball (1979) as Alisande
- Silver Dream Racer (1980) as Carol
