= Ed Welch =

English songwriter, composer, conductor and arranger

- Born: Edward William Welch; 22 October 1947 (age 79); Oxford, England, UK
- Education: Ardingly College; Trinity College of Music
- Occupations: Songwriter and composer

Edward William Welch (born 22 October 1947) is an English songwriter, composer, conductor and arranger.

== Early life and education ==
Ed Welch had a classical music upbringing. He attended Christ Church Cathedral School from 1957 to 1961, where he was Head Chorister at Christ Church Cathedral, Oxford, and then a first music scholar at Ardingly College in Sussex. He gained a scholarship to Trinity College of Music London, studying composition with Arnold Cooke. Upon graduating in 1965, he joined United Artists Music where he learned the various branches of the music business. He wrote arrangements, composed B-sides, and plugged the UA catalogue at the BBC.

== Songwriting ==
In 1971, Welch recorded an album, Clowns, including songs he had co-written with Tom Paxton and session musicians such as Mike de Albuquerque and Cozy Powell. In 1972, he acted as producer on a version of "I Don't Know How to Love Him" by Sylvie McNeill on a UK 45 on United Artists UA UP35415 released in time for the first UK Stage Musical of Jesus Christ Superstar. In 1973, he wrote the title song to Spike Milligan's film Adolf Hitler: My Part in his Downfall, which marked the start of a 25-year collaboration with Milligan.

Welch made his television debut in 1972, on The Old Grey Whistle Test. In 1978 and 1979, he appeared in the Spike Milligan BBC series Q8 and Q9, performing his own songs (including "The Carpet is Always Greener Under Someone Else's Bed" and "Love to Make Music by") and songs co-written with Milligan, including "I've Got This Photograph of You!" and "Silly Old Baboon". This unlikely duo released an album in 1979 on the United Artists label, Spike Milligan and Ed Welch Sing Songs from Q8. In 1976, he composed the score for Milligan's adaptation of Paul Gallico's The Snow Goose. Narrated by Milligan and performed by the London Symphony Orchestra with Welch conducting, the RCA recording was such a success that it entered the pop LP charts and has been performed at many concerts since.

Welch's songs have been recorded by artists including Cilla Black, Davy Jones, Shirley Bassey, Matt Monro, Design, and Tina Reynolds, whose recording of 'When Morning Has Come' reached number 20 on the Irish charts in 1973.

Welch co-wrote the 1995 Icelandic entry to the Eurovision Song Contest, "Núna", (with Björgvin Halldórsson).

== Compositions for stage, screen and recorded narrations ==
His film work included the scores to British sex comedies such as the Confessions series (Confessions of a Pop Performer (1975), Confessions of a Driving Instructor (1976), Confessions from a Holiday Camp (1977)), Stand Up, Virgin Soldiers (1977), and Rosie Dixon – Night Nurse (1978). Also in 1978, he composed the score for the remake of The Thirty Nine Steps, including an extended piano piece entitled The Thirty-Nine Steps Concerto (a nod to Richard Addinsell's Warsaw Concerto), later recording it with Christopher Headington as soloist. In the same year, he moved to the West Country, where he was appointed musical director for Television South West (TSW). He composed the station identification music for TSW as well as scores for TSW films such as the musical Doubting Thomas (1983; written by John Bartlett, starring Paul Nicholas and Stephanie Lawrence), and numerous local programmes, including Gus Honeybun in 1987. Welch also composed and conducted music for Television South (TVS), from 1987 until the channel disappeared on 31 December 1992. His credits at TVS included conducting a live two-and-a-half-hour New Year's Eve show, with 56 musical items, some of which he had also arranged.

In 1982, Welch composed the score for the play Private Dick, by Richard Maher and Roger Michell. He also composed the score to the Cannon and Ball comedy film The Boys in Blue. The following year he wrote the theme to the popular ITV, BBC Two and Sky1 quiz show Blockbusters, which ran from 1983 to 2001; the tune soon became one of the most recognisable television themes of all time.

Among his work for children, Welch composed the score for Andrew Bailey's Aesop in Fableland (Arista Records, 1979), which was narrated by Arthur Lowe and performed by the London Symphony Orchestra. He adapted fairy tales and wrote the scripts for a 1982 LP with Spike Milligan, later developed into a children's cartoon series of the same name, Wolves, Witches and Giants, which ran from 1995 to 1999. He is credited for the music in the 2001 cartoon series Binka. He wrote songs for the new format of Thomas & Friends from 2004 to 2008.

== Other work ==
With Roger Messer, Welch ran South Western Studios in Torquay, a company which produced professional demonstration tapes for aspiring songwriters. In 2004, he composed a piece of music for Liberal Democrat candidate, Mike Treleaven.

== Composed ==
- The $64,000 Question
- All Clued Up
- Binka (2001–2002)
- Blockbusters (1983–2001)
- Catchphrase (1986–1994)
- Connections (1988–1989)
- Construction Site (1999–2002)
- Crosswits (1988–1989)
- Doctor at the Top (1991)
- Family Catchphrase (1993–1994)
- Frootie Tooties (1992)
- Grizzly Tales for Gruesome Kids (2000–2012)
- Funky Valley
- The Hoobs (2001–2003)
- Knightmare (1987–1994)
- Mopatop's Shop (1999–2005)
- The National Lottery (1998)
- New Faces (1986–1988)
- North Tonight (1988–1990)
- One Foot in the Grave (incidental music)
- Parallel 9 (1992)
- Shillingbury Tales (1981)
- Sweethearts (1987)
- The Dodo Club (1987–1989)
- That's Showbusiness (1989–1991)
- The Ratties (1988)
- Thomas & Friends (2004–2008)
- That's My Dog!
- Wolves, Witches and Giants (1995–1998)

Ed Welch also composed over 300 pieces, including pieces for a music library and a number of local programmes for a number of ITV contractors, mainly TVS and TSW
