= Terry's Juveniles =

British dance troupe

Terry's Juveniles were a troupe of young dancers who performed regularly on British theatre stages, and in films, from about 1919 until the late 1960s, with regular changes of personnel. The group was founded and trained by Theresa Freedman (22 January 1884 – 4 February 1973), known as "Miss Terry".

Freedman was born in Swansea, the daughter of Polish Jewish immigrants, but moved to London with her parents as a child. She became a dance teacher and established Terry's Juveniles in about 1919, at a time when choruses of children were a central part of pantomimes and other theatrical shows. At one time Terry Freedman ran several stage schools, and an office in Shaftesbury Avenue.

The girls involved were aged about 12, about 5 feet (1.5 m) tall, and were selected through Miss Terry's visits to schools as well as through advertisements and recommendations. Once they grew too tall or appeared older, they had to leave. They performed together as singers and dancers in summer variety shows as well as in pantomimes, especially those run by Emile Littler in Blackpool and other provincial centres. When performing, they were given lessons in the morning, prior to afternoon and evening performances.

Terry's Juveniles regularly appeared on stage with stars of the time, such as George Formby and Arthur Askey, and featured in the film She Shall Have Music (1935), and in the 1950 Royal Variety Performance. Those who started their entertainment careers as members of Terry's Juveniles included Dorothy Squires, Sheila White, and Melvyn Hayes. In later years, the troupe included boys as well as girls. Hayes later said: "Miss Terry was a ferocious Jewish lady... [At his audition] she said: 'Can you sing?' No. 'Can you dance?' No. 'Are you Jewish?' Yes. 'You got the part.' "

Changing tastes contributed to the troupe disbanding in about 1968. Theresa Freedman died in hospital in Bristol in 1973 at the age of 89.
