= Tony Booth (actor) =

English actor (1931–2017)

- Born: Anthony George Booth; 9 October 1931; Liverpool, Lancashire, England
- Died: 25 September 2017 (aged 85); Todmorden, Yorkshire, England
- Occupation: Actor
- Years active: 1960–2010
- Spouses: Gale Smith (m. 1954, divorced) Pat Phoenix (m. 1986; died 1986) Nancy Jaeger (m. 1988; div. 1996) Stephanie Buckley (m. 1998)
- Children: 8, including Cherie and Lauren

Anthony George Booth (9 October 1931 – 25 September 2017) was an English actor, often known for his role as Mike Rawlins in the BBC series Till Death Us Do Part. He would become the father-in-law of the prime minister of the United Kingdom Tony Blair from 1997 until 2007 and the widower of Coronation Street star Pat Phoenix, having married her a few days before her death in 1986.

== Early life ==
Booth was born into a working-class family in Jubilee Road, Liverpool, in 1931 and raised Catholic. His mother was a Roman Catholic of Irish descent; his father, who worked as a merchant seaman during the Second World War, was a Catholic convert. Tony Booth attended St Edmund's Infants School and spent a year in hospital as a child with diphtheria. He then passed the Eleven-plus examination and attended St Mary's College, Crosby, where he was awarded a bursary to cover the cost of his books.

His hopes of going to university were dashed when he had to leave school and get a job after his father was badly injured in an industrial accident. He then worked as a clerk in a docklands warehouse and at the United States Consulate in Liverpool, before being called up for national service with the Royal Corps of Signals.

== Acting ==
Booth developed a taste for acting when posted in the Army to SHAPE in Paris. He spent five years in repertory theatre, before appearing in films and television during the 1960s. He played roles in over twenty films, including The L-Shaped Room (1962), Corruption (1968), The Girl with a Pistol (1968), Brannigan (1975), Priest (1994) and Owd Bob (1997). He appeared early in the run of the television series Coronation Street in 1960 and in an episode of The Avengers, but it was his role as the left-wing son-in-law in Till Death Us Do Part (1965) that brought him recognition.

Booth made guest appearances in many other television series. He starred alongside Robin Askwith in the Confessions of ... British sex comedy film series as Sidney Noggett between 1974 and 1977. These were Confessions of a Window Cleaner, Confessions of a Pop Performer, Confessions of a Driving Instructor and Confessions from a Holiday Camp.

From 1985 to 1986, Booth appeared as pub landlord Ted Pilkington in the short-lived ITV soap Albion Market. He starred in the 1998 short film The Duke, playing an elderly man who tells his adoring grandson that he is John Wayne. In 2001, Booth appeared in several episodes of Family Affairs playing Barry Hurst, Sadie Hargreaves' brother-in-law.

Booth played a homeless man named Nobby Stuart in a special two-hander episode of EastEnders in 2003. In 2007, he also played a homeless man called Errol Michaels in Emmerdale. Each of these characters played the purpose of a spiritual guide to a down-and-out character: in EastEnders Alfie Moon (played by Shane Richie), and in Emmerdale Bob Hope (Tony Audenshaw).

== Personal life ==
Booth was married four times and had eight daughters by five women. By his first wife Gale Howard, he had two daughters, Cherie and Lyndsey. Cherie, a King's Counsel, is married to the former Prime Minister Sir Tony Blair. While Booth was a long-standing supporter of the Labour Party, his politics differed from those of his daughter and her husband.

With his third wife, Nancy Jaeger, he had a daughter, Joanna.

Booth had five other daughters with partners he did not marry. He left Gale, his first wife, in 1961 for Julia Allan, with whom he had two daughters Jenia and Bronwen. He had a daughter, Lucy Thomas, in 1967 with Ann Gannon, who worked in radio sales, after a brief relationship; this did not become known publicly until 2002. His relationship with Pamela Smith, which began in the 1960s, lasted 13 years; the couple had Booth's other two daughters, Emma and Lauren Booth, a broadcaster and journalist. Booth's grandchildren include Euan Blair and Nicky Blair.

Booth nearly burned to death in November 1979 when, during a drunken attempt to get into his locked flat, he fell into a drum of paraffin. He spent six months in hospital and needed 26 skin graft operations. Shortly after his discharge from hospital, he went to visit an 'old flame', Coronation Street actress Pat Phoenix. She took him in and nursed him back to full health, and they lived together for six years. Phoenix's own health subsequently declined, and the pair married a few days before her death from lung cancer in 1986.

In a rebuke to the British government's treatment of pensioners, Booth retired to Blacklion, County Cavan, in Ireland in 2003, but returned and lived in Broadbottom, 10 miles (16 km) east of Manchester. In 2006 he said he was the victim of anti-English bias while living in Ireland.

Booth was diagnosed with Alzheimer's disease in 2004. He suffered a stroke in 2010. He also had chronic heart failure and chronic obstructive pulmonary disease. Booth died on 25 September 2017 at home, aged 85.

In March 2019, Booth's widow Steph published the book Married to Alzheimer's: A Life Less Ordinary with Tony Booth, a memoir about her time caring for her husband.

== Filmography ==
- Suspect (1960) – Parkin
- Pit of Darkness (1961) – Ted
- The Valiant (1962)
- Mix Me a Person (1962) – at 'La Paloma' / Gravy
- The L-Shaped Room (1962) – Youth in Street
- The Partner (1963) – Buddy Forrester
- The Hi-Jackers (1963) – Terry McKinley
- Of Human Bondage (1964) – Martin (uncredited)
- The Saint (1965) - Hans
- The Return of Mr. Moto (1965) – Hovath
- The Saint (1966) - Pyotr
- The Girl with the Pistol (1968) – John
- Corruption (1968) – Mike Orme
- Till Death Us Do Part (1969) – Mike Rawlins (the boyfriend)
- Neither the Sea nor the Sand (1972) – Delamare
- Adolf Hitler: My Part in His Downfall (1973) – Tommy Brettell
- Montreal Main (1974)
- Confessions of a Window Cleaner (1974) – Sidney Noggett
- Brannigan (1975) – Freddy
- Confessions of a Pop Performer (1975) – Sidney Noggett
- Confessions of a Driving Instructor (1976) – Sidney Noggett
- Confessions from a Holiday Camp (1977) – Sidney Noggett
- Confessions from the David Galaxy Affair (1979) – Steve
- Priest (1994) – Tommy
- Owd Bob (1998) – Tammas
- The Duke (1998)
- Treasure Island (1999) – Chief Revenue Officer
- Revengers Tragedy (2002) – Lord Antonio
- Upstaged (2005) – Candidate – Leggings
- Gone to the Dogs (2006) – Jack

== Memoirs ==
- Tony Booth, Stroll On (1989)
- Tony Booth, A Labour of Love (1997)
- Tony Booth, What's Left? (2002)
