= Barrymore (TV series) =

- Genre: Light entertainment
- Presented by: Michael Barrymore
- Country of origin: United Kingdom
- Original language: English
- No. of series: 7
- No. of episodes: 76

Production
- Running time: 60 minutes (including adverts)
- Production company: LWT

Original release
- Network: ITV
- Release: 21 December 1991 – 29 December 2000

Barrymore is a British light entertainment show presented by Michael Barrymore and produced by LWT for ITV. It originally aired from 21 December 1991 to 29 December 2000.

== Transmissions ==
Series	Start date	End date	Episodes
1	21 December 1991	15 February 1992	8
2	25 December 1992	13 March 1993	10
3	8 January 1994	30 April 1994	16
4	29 January 1995	5 August 1995	14
5	27 January 1996	13 April 1996	12
6	19 April 1997	28 June 1997	10
7	19 November 2000	29 December 2000	6
