= Lauren Booth =

British journalist and activist

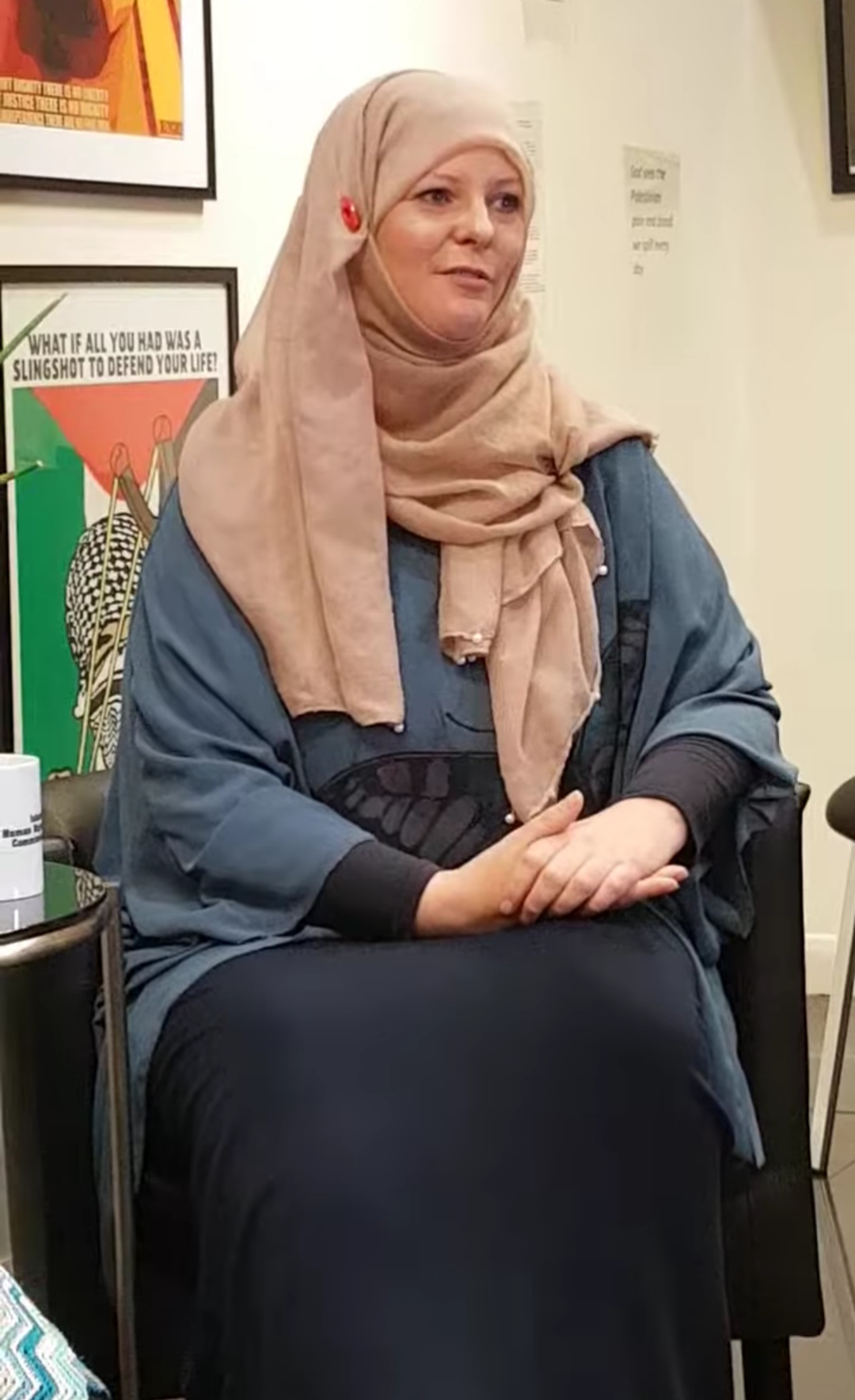
- Booth in 2018
- Born: Sarah Jane Booth; 22 July 1967 (age 59); Islington, London, England
- Other name: Sarah Booth
- Occupations: Journalist, broadcaster, public speaker
- Spouses: Craig Darby (m. 2000; div. 2010) Sohale Ahmed (m. 2012; div. 2018)
- Children: 2
- Parents: Tony Booth; Pamela Smith
- Relatives: Cherie Blair (paternal half-sister)
- Website: www.laurenbooth.co.uk

Lauren Booth (born Sarah Jane Booth; 22 July 1967) is an English broadcaster, journalist and activist holding a VIP Palestinian passport as well as a British passport.

== Early life ==
Sarah Jane Booth was born and grew up in predominantly Jewish Golders Green, North West London. Booth is a half-sister of Cherie Blair, wife of former British Prime Minister Tony Blair, and the daughter of actor Tony Booth. She trained as an actress at the London Academy of Performing Arts and then spent several years touring Europe with various regional theatre companies.

Booth was not raised in any religion, though her father was raised a Catholic and her mother, who was purported to be Jewish, was a Christian. Her parents never married each other. She has a sister, Emma, along with Cherie and five other half-sisters.

== Media career ==
In 1997, Booth entered journalism. Her earliest writing experiences were with the London Evening Standard, writing the column 'About Town'. In 1999, she began to write for the political magazine, the New Statesman, where she remained for four years. At the same time, she began writing columns and features for The Mail on Sunday as a columnist.

In 2006, she was a contestant on the ITV reality show, I'm a Celebrity...Get Me Out of Here!.

Between 2006 and 2008 Booth presented In Focus on the UK's Islam Channel. She has had a long association with the Iranian owned Press TV, starting with Between The Headlines in 2008. Between 2010 and 2012 she presented Remember Palestine and Diaspora.

In 2014, she presented her own series on the newly launched British Muslim TV, called Talking Booth. In 2014, she took a senior producer post at Al Jazeera in Doha, but was let go a few months later.

== Activism ==
Booth was a vocal opponent of the Iraq War giving speeches at many rallies against the invasion. She is an outspoken activist and a supporter of the Stop the War Coalition.

In August 2008, she traveled to Gaza by ship from Cyprus, along with 46 other activists, to highlight the blockade of the Gaza Strip and deliver hearing aids and balloons to a school for the deaf in Gaza. She was subsequently refused entry into both Israel and Egypt. She claimed that by refusing her the right to leave Gaza and return to her home country, Israel was in breach of Article 13 of the Universal Declaration of Human Rights, specifically regarding freedom of movement.

Booth stated that Gaza is "the largest concentration camp in the world today", although The Jerusalem Post claimed that several photographs of Booth in a well-stocked Gaza grocery "bel[ied] the grim picture she painted of the Strip". During her visit, she received a VIP Palestinian passport from Hamas prime minister Ismail Haniyeh. Booth left Gaza through the Rafah Border Crossing into Egypt on 20 September 2008. In 2009, she returned to Gaza with the aid convoy Viva Palestina, set up by the British politician George Galloway.

Since 2012, she returned on several occasions as the Chair of Trustees with the charity she co-founded, Peacetrail, delivering assistance to students and families in the region. In 2018, Booth, another trustee of Peacetrail and the chief executive, her husband Sohale Ahmed, were disqualified from holding any trustee positions after the Charity Commission could not account for about half of Peacetrail's income.

In June 2011, Booth joined Cageprisoners as a patron. However, from 2015 Booth was no longer a patron of the organisation.

== Conversion to Islam ==
In 2010, Booth converted to Islam a few months after her visit to Iran, and became a practising Muslim. Booth appeared at the Islam Channel's Global Peace and Unity event on 23 October 2010, wearing a hijab, stating: "My name is Lauren Booth, and I am a Muslim." She attributed her awakening to her experiences in Iran as a reporter.

== Personal life ==
Booth lives in Istanbul and makes videos about Turkey for her YouTube channel.
