= The Thirty Nine Steps (1978 film) =

- Original British cinema poster by Vic Fair
- Directed by: Don Sharp
- Written by: Michael Robson
- Based on: The Thirty-Nine Steps; 1915 novel by John Buchan
- Produced by: Greg Smith
- Starring: Robert Powell; David Warner; Karen Dotrice; John Mills
- Cinematography: John Coquillon
- Music by: Ed Welch
- Production company: Norfolk International Pictures
- Distributed by: The Rank Organisation
- Release date: 23 November 1978 (UK)
- Running time: 102 minutes
- Country: United Kingdom
- Language: English
- Budget: $2 million or £1.5 million or £950,000
- Box office: $10 million (outside US as at April 1980) $1,046,332 (US)

The Thirty Nine Steps is a 1978 British thriller film directed by Don Sharp, with screenplay by British playwright Michael Robson, based on the novel The Thirty-Nine Steps by John Buchan. It was the third film version of the 1915 novel.

This version of Buchan's tale stars Robert Powell as Richard Hannay, Karen Dotrice as Alex, John Mills as Colonel Scudder, and a host of other well-known British actors in smaller parts. It is generally regarded as the closest to the novel, being set before the Great War. The early events and overall feel of the film bear much resemblance to Buchan's original story, albeit with a few changes such as the re-casting of Scudder as a more immediately sympathetic character and the introduction of a love interest. It also introduces a different meaning for the "thirty-nine steps", although unlike its filmed predecessors it returns to Buchan's original notion of being an actual staircase. It is known for the Big Ben sequence near the end, inspired by the film My Learned Friend (1943) starring Will Hay, although this is its most fundamental deviation from Buchan's original story, which reaches its culmination in a coastal location in Kent.

Powell later reprised the role in the ITV series Hannay which ran for 13 episodes from 1988 to 1989.

== Plot ==
In 1914, Imperial German spies are everywhere in London. After a spate of mysterious assassinations of important British politicians, a retired British Intelligence officer, Colonel Scudder, realises his life and his mysterious black notebook are in danger. He turns to Richard Hannay, a mining engineer who is visiting Great Britain for a short time before returning to the Union of South Africa, who happens to be staying in a flat in the same building. Scudder tells Hannay of a plot by Prussian (German) 'sleeper' agents, who are planning to precipitate a world war against the Triple Entente alliance (future Allied powers) by assassinating the Royal Greek prime minister while visiting the UK.

Hannay reluctantly gives Scudder shelter in his flat, despite his initial distrust of him. In the morning, Hannay leaves to purchase a train ticket to his family hometown, the village of Strathallan north in Scotland, while Scudder remains at work on his notes in the flat. When the Prussian agents attempt to enter the flat, Scudder flees down the fire escape but he is spotted posting a package containing his secret notebook in a pillar box. Scudder flees to St Pancras railway station, where he knows Hannay will be, to give him a second black book.

At the railway station, just seconds before he can reach Hannay, Scudder is murdered by the agents. With his dying breath he gives Hannay a message he doesn't quite understand. Unfortunately however, Hannay is mistaken by witnesses at the railway station as being the assailant and is arrested but is soon captured by the Prussians while being transferred in loose security to jail. During their interrogation of Hannay, they ask what he knows of the "Thirty Nine Steps". The Prussians allow him to get away and escape in the hope he will later lead them to the secret notebook. At St Pancras, Hannay manages to find Scudder's second notebook, but this turns out to be a dummy, with only a three-word riddle in it. Only Hannay can understand the riddle, which sends him up to Scotland to find the real notebook. Hannay flees to Scotland on a northbound train, but he is forced to make a daredevil escape jumping on a bridge when the police board the railway cars.

Hannay attempts to solve the mystery whilst on the run from the police, led by Chief Superintendent Lomas, and the Prussian agents, led by Sir Edmund Appleton, a Prussian sympathiser highly placed in the British government.

On the Scottish moors Hannay, claiming to be on the run as part of a wager, meets Alex Mackenzie and her fiance, David Hamilton. On the run again, Hannay has to pose as a Liberal Party political orator and ad lib a speech at an election hustings. He indicates the identity of the Prussian agents to Alex Mackenzie and David Hamilton and with their help Scudder's book is found, but Hamilton is then killed by the Prussians. The coded information is partly deciphered and the true plans of the Prussian agents are revealed. The agents intend to murder the visiting Royal Greek Prime Minister by planting a bomb in the Palace of Westminster, while the British Parliament is meeting thus also causing a criminal terrorist incident, leading to unrest in the always unstable Balkan Peninsula and precipitate an international crisis, possibly sparking a world war. The "Thirty Nine Steps" refers to the number of stairs in the landmark Clock Tower (or "Big Ben") in the Palace of Westminster (from "Lauderdale Door to the clock itself").

When the Metropolitan Police and Hannay reach the top of the clock tower, the agents have already planted the bomb and have locked the clock room. Hannay realises that the bomb is to be set off by the clock timer mechanism at 11:45 am. To give the police more time, Hannay breaks the glass of the outside clock-face, climbs out onto the face of the clock, almost 100 meters above ground and physically stops the minute hand as it moves towards the figure IX (xx:45). By hanging from the end of the minute hand, Hannay manages to jam the clock at 11:44 am, one minute before, long enough for the police to break into the clock room where they kill the remaining spies and deactivate the bomb. The clock mechanism jams and stops working before the clock's minute hand falls into a vertical position at 11:30 am. Hannay, however, still hangs on and one of the officers saves him with a looped rope lariat. Lomas recognises a police uniform and at the docks Hannay and other officers capture Appleton, who had also stolen secret details of the deployment of all Royal Navy warships.

Appleton is convicted of treason and Hannay is declared a hero for helping Britain gain valuable time to prepare defences for a future "Great War". In the closing shot, Hannay is shown walking arm in arm with Alex Mackenzie.

== Cast ==
- Robert Powell as Richard Hannay
- David Warner as Sir Edmund Appleton
- Eric Porter as Chief Superintendent Lomas
- Karen Dotrice as Alex Mackenzie
- John Mills as Scudder
- George Baker as Sir Walter Bullivant
- Ronald Pickup as Bayliss
- Donald Pickering as Marshall
- Timothy West as Porton
- Miles Anderson as David Hamilton
- Andrew Keir as Lord Rohan
- Robert Flemyng as Magistrate
- William Squire as Harkness
- Paul McDowell as McLean
- David Collings as Tillotson
- John Normington as Fletcher
- John Welsh as Lord Bellhane
- Edward de Souza as Woodville
- Tony Steedman as Admiral
- John Grieve as P.C. Forbes
- Donald Bisset as Renfrew
- Derek Anders as Donald
- Oliver Maguire as Marlins
- Joan Henley as Lady Nettleship
- Prentis Hancock as Perryman
- Leo Dolan as Milkman
- James Garbutt as Miller
- Artro Morris as The Scot
- Robert Gillespie as Crombie
- Raymond Young as Guide
- Paul Jerricho as P.C. Scott
- Michael Bilton as Vicar

== Production ==
Hannay (Powell) hanging from Big Ben during the film's denouement. The scene was a departure from Buchan's novel, but was added because the Houses of Parliament represented the centre of British power in 1914.

Producer Greg Smith said he wanted to make the film because he had always been a fan of John Buchan's books and wanted to do a version of The Thirty-Nine Steps which was "true to the period in which the novel was set, just prior to the Great War, when Europe was one huge powderkeg and nobody knew what a world war was."

The executive producer was James Kenelm Clarke who said the film "was an Edwardian melodrama, the way we think Buchan would have liked to see his own penny dreadful." The rights became available when Rank did not renew the licence. Clarke bought them for what he said was "a tremendous amount of money", had a script written by Michael Robson, which he then took back to Rank. They agreed to finance when Robert Powell agreed to play Hannay.

Smith claimed "the Hitchcock version was about 20 percent Buchan and 80 percent Hitchcock. Our goal was to turn it around and make the film 80 percent Buchan and 20 percent invention." Smith chose Sharp to direct "because he's one of Britain's best action adventure directors and he was familiar with the period." Sharp had recently shot a remake of The Four Feathers with Powell. He said making the film was a very enjoyable experience.

Powell said "If we had tried to use Buchan's book literally we would not have had a film at all. For one thing it's thoroughly anti-Semitic and no one would get away with that."

Robert Powell was cast in part because of his success in the mini series Jesus of Nazareth. The script did add a romantic interest for Hannay, played by Karen Dotrice. "You can't make a movie without women", said Smith. "You can't go through life without women."

The film added a new climax with Hannay climbing on to Big Ben. Smith:

In the book, the 39 steps lead down to a beach and filmically there is not much you can do with that. Today, audiences demand more of a grandstand finish. That was the major liberty we took – the ending. People can say, 'You're not being true to the ending,' as they stay away by the millions... [Big Ben was chosen for the end] because it was an analogy we were working for – Europe was a time bomb in 1914. And we figured that the centre of European politics would undoubtedly have been the House of Commons. So we thought, 'Why not finish the film in the political seat of Britain?'

The film was the first in a series of films financed by Tony Williams at the Rank Organisation which was (temporarily as it turned out) increasing its film production in the late '70s.

"You have to go back in time to tell a story that doesn't have to face '70s problems", said Williams in 1978. "What people are nostalgic for isn't necessarily any particular period, but the happier values that are missing today."

Williams defended the idea of adapting a previously adapted novel:

The old films suffer technically against today's. The pace of modern films is much faster. The style of acting is different. Those old actors were marvelous, but if you consult the man in the street, he's more interested in seeing a current artist than someone who's been dead for years.

A replica of the clock was built at Pinewood Studios. Powell recalls that although in a controlled environment, he was still hanging at a significant height above the studio floor. The idea of Hannay dangling from the hands of Big Ben came in part from a stunt performed by Harold Lloyd in the silent comedy classic Safety Last (1923). The privately owned Severn Valley Railway loaned the film a steam engine, together with rolling stock and a section of track, for shooting.

The ending originally had Karen Dotrice's character telling Richard Hannay she would not marry him. Rank's head of Leisure, Ed Chilton, felt this was inconsistent with the rest of the film so a shot was added to give the indication of a happy ending.

== Soundtrack ==
A soundtrack album was released on United Artists Records. In addition to cues from the film, Ed Welch composed The Thirty Nine Steps Concerto, an extended piece for piano and orchestra in a vein similar to Richard Addinsell's Warsaw Concerto. Christopher Headington was the soloist, with the Rank Studio Orchestra conducted by the composer. A CD release was made available for the first time by Quartet Records in January 2022.

== Release ==
=== Box office ===
The film was one of the most popular movies of 1979 at the British box office. Sharp says he was told the film was the most financially successful of all the movies from Rank's revived production slate under Tony Williams.

In the UK it had a distributor's gross of £364,434.

=== Critical ===
Greg Smith said that John Buchan's son, Lord Tweedsmuir, was pleased the film used more of his father's book, and that he thought his father would have liked the Big Ben ending.

Filmink argued the film was "a more successful remake" than the 1959 version "because it departs even further from the Hitchcock version (although there’s a North by Northwest homage). It’s not as good as the 1935 film, but it’s fun and has a reason to exist."
