= Gone to the Dogs (2006 film) =

- Directed by: Philip Barnard
- Written by: Philip Barnard
- Starring: Antony Booth; Dora Bryan
- Release date: 30 January 2006
- Country: United Kingdom

Gone to the Dogs is a 2006 film by director Philip Barnard. It has been described as the shaggiest dog story ever told. The film stars British actors Dora Bryan and Antony Booth, the father-in-law of Tony Blair. Appearing alongside the human cast are 15 dogs trained by former Boomtown Rats guitarist Gerry Cott.

The plot revolves around Jack (Booth) who dies and returns as a dog which is adopted by his widowed wife Rose (Bryan).

The Gone to the Dogs website was nominated for the BAFTA Interactive, Film award in 2005. It includes a game "powered by CATS (Canine Algorithmic Transfer System)" which, extending a theme of the film, can suggest a breed of dog corresponding to the user's personality.
