= Mick and Mac =

- Starring: Michael Barrymore
- Country of origin: United Kingdom
- Original language: English
- No. of episodes: 13

Production
- Running time: 10 mins

Original release
- Network: BBC
- Release: 3 January – 28 March 1990

Mick and Mac is a British comedy series, which aired on BBC Television in 1990 starring Michael Barrymore.
