= My Kind of People =

- Genre: Comedy
- Presented by: Michael Barrymore
- Country of origin: United Kingdom
- Original language: English
- No. of series: 1
- No. of episodes: 10

Production
- Running time: 30 minutes (including adverts)
- Production company: LWT

Original release
- Network: ITV
- Release: 26 October – 26 December 1995

Related
- My Kind of Music

My Kind of People is an ITV television show presented by British entertainer Michael Barrymore broadcast from 26 October to 26 December 1995.

== Format ==
Barrymore travelled around the country in his customised sports car visiting shopping centres, where amateurs performed on a stage for the programme unrehearsed. Some acts were simply shown performing together with the audience reaction, whereas others were interviewed by Barrymore or shown interspersed with footage of Barrymore to the side of the stage engaged in foolish behaviour in order to get reactions from the audience. Often, Barrymore would join the act on stage and continue the tomfoolery.

== Notable performers ==
Susan Boyle performed on the show, 13 years before she became famous worldwide for her Britain's Got Talent audition. Barrymore mocked her as she performed "I Don't Know How to Love Him" from Jesus Christ Superstar at the Olympia Mall in East Kilbride, lying on the stage beneath her and pretending to look up her skirt as she performed, attempting to sing with her during the end of the song and then staging a kiss with her.
