= Confessions of a Pop Performer =

1975 British film by Norman Cohen

- Theatrical release poster
- Directed by: Norman Cohen
- Written by: Christopher Wood
- Produced by: Greg Smith; Michael Klinger (executive producer)
- Starring: Robin Askwith; Antony Booth
- Cinematography: Alan Hume
- Edited by: Geoffrey Foot
- Production company: Columbia Pictures
- Distributed by: Columbia-Warner Distributors
- Release date: July 1975
- Running time: 91 minutes
- Country: United Kingdom
- Language: English

Confessions of a Pop Performer (also known as Timothy Lea's Confessions of a Pop Performer) is a 1975 British sex-farce film directed by Norman Cohen and starring Robin Askwith and Anthony Booth. It was written by Christopher Wood based on his novel Confessions from the Pop Scene. It is the second instalment in the Confessions series of films and continues the erotic adventures of Timothy Lea.

== Plot ==
Sidney overhears a band in his local pub and aspires to be their manager, not so ably assisted by his brother-in-law, Timmy, both still window cleaning for a living. They rename the band Kipper and after a misfortune, Timmy joins the line-up and many sexual encounters follow as a result. Unfortunately, Timmy's natural talent is more mayhem than rock star and disaster ensues of mostly the semi-clothed kind.

== Cast ==
- Robin Askwith as Timothy Lea
- Antony Booth as Sidney Noggett
- Bill Maynard as Mr Lea
- Doris Hare as Mrs Lea
- Sheila White as Rosie Noggett
- Bob Todd as Mr Barnwell
- Jill Gascoine as Mrs Barnwell
- Peter Jones as Maxy Naus
- Carol Hawkins as Jill Brown
- Peter Cleall as Nutter Normington
- Richard Warwick as Petal
- David Auker as Zombie
- Diane Langton as Ruby Climax
- Linda Regan as Brenda Climax
- Robert Dorning as Augustus
- Ian Lavender as Rodney
- Andee Cromarty as Fanny
- Rita Webb as Fanny's mother
- Anita Kay as Sonia
- Bill Pertwee as husband with javelin
- David Hamilton as TV interviewer
- Helli Louise as Eva
- Sally Harrison as Patsie
- John François Landry as Editor
- Vicki Woolf as Secretary
- Rula Lenska as receptionist
- Jane Hayden as girl at crossing
- David Prowse as man at cinema
- Bobby Sparrow as girl at cinema

== Soundtrack ==
Confessions of a Pop Performer was the only film in the series to spawn a soundtrack album (Polydor 2383350), with musical numbers produced by Ed Welch, and credited to the film's fictional groups Kipper and The Climax Sisters, the latter played by Diane Langton and Linda Regan in the film, although Sue Martine provides Regan's singing voice. All lead vocals for Kipper were sung by Maynard Williams. The album also includes music from Confessions of a Window Cleaner (1974) and in-character ‘Timmy Chat’ from Robin Askwith

Side 1

1. "Confessions of Timmy Tea (Three's a Crowd)"
2. "Timmy Chat" (Robin Askwith)
3. "The Clapham" (Kipper)
4. "Oh Sha La La" (Kipper)
5. "Accidents will Happen" (Kipper)
6. "Timmy Chat" (Robin Askwith)
7. "I Need You (like a hole in the head!)" (The Climax Sisters)
8. "Kipper" (Kipper)
9. "Timmy Chat" (Robin Askwith)

Side 2

1. "Hell of a Fuss" (Teddy Palmer and the Rumble Band)
2. "Pop Performer Medley ("Fire and Foam", "See Though Jazz", "The Crash", "Timmy Goes Shopping", "Theme for Truncheon and Helmet")
3. "Timmy Chat" (Robin Askwith)
4. "This is your Life" (Three's a Crowd)
5. "Charlie Snowgarden" (Sam Sklair)
6. "Timmy Chat" (Robin Askwith)
7. "Confessions of Timmy Tea (reprise)" (Three's a Crowd)

== Critical reception ==
The Monthly Film Bulletin said "Creaky gags, overly familiar slapstick routines, sniggering innuendo, grimly leaden mugging and a nervously regular injection of titillating sequences on the lines of the average German sex comedy: the follow-up to the huge box-office success of Confessions of a Window Cleaner is everything one has come to dread in British comedy. With hindsight, there seems to be a certain inevitability about this crossing of the Carry On series (now well into middle age) with the ethos of the working class anti-heroes that emerged in the early Sixties: Sidney James has found his younger alter ego in the charmless Robin Askwith, a kind of callow reductio ad absurdum of the early Albert Finney/Tom Courtenay characters. In this light, the trundling out of the gorilla suit from Morgan seems to be a particularly cynical nail driven into the coffin."

Variety wrote: "It's simple-minded stuff. Most of the jokes are laid on with a trowel, though some sight gags devised by Cohen and scripter Christopher Wood ... work well enough. The sex is invariably frenzied and ultimately monotonous. The ironic and unexpected are notably absent in all the nonsense. Askwith is reasonably appealing as the callow sex object, though it's hard to fathom his unerring magnetism for the femmes, even in this fantasy context. Booth is okay as the scheming brother-in-law, and both Doris Hare and Bill Maynard have winning moments as young Lea's parents. Sheila White is good as his sister. Technical credits are all proficient, and the film is well-paced for the market it figures to reach."

The Radio Times Guide to Films gave the film 1/5 stars, writing: "Robin Askwith abandons his window-cleaning round to help organise a tour for a band of no-hopers and finds himself knee-deep in groupies (the finale at the Palladium has to be seen to be believed). Askwith struggles with a dismal script and comes off much better than Tony Blair's father-in-law, Anthony Booth."
