= Bob Martin (TV series) =

British drama-comedy television series

- Genre: Sitcom
- Starring: Michael Barrymore
- Country of origin: United Kingdom
- Original language: English
- No. of series: 2
- No. of episodes: 12

Production
- Producer: Granada Television
- Running time: 38 minutes

Original release
- Network: ITV
- Release: 2 April 2000 – 4 June 2001

Bob Martin is a British television drama-comedy. Its concept bears significant resemblance to The Larry Sanders Show. Michael Barrymore, Keith Allen and Denis Lawson are its principal actors. It was made by Granada Television for the ITV network from 2 April 2000 to 4 June 2001.
