= Norman Cohen =

Irish film director and producer (1936–1983)

- Born: 11 June 1936; Dublin, Ireland
- Died: 26 October 1983 (aged 47); Van Nuys, California, United States
- Occupations: Film director, film producer

Norman Cohen (11 June 1936 in Dublin – 26 October 1983 in Van Nuys, California) was an Irish film director and producer, best known for directing two feature films based on television comedy programmes, Till Death Us Do Part (1969) and Dad's Army (1971).

== Directing career ==
Cohen was also a director of several of the Confessions of... sex comedy series: Confessions of a Pop Performer (1975), Confessions of a Driving Instructor (1976) and Confessions from a Holiday Camp (1977).

In addition to those films, he also produced as well as directed the adaptation of Spike Milligan's Adolf Hitler: My Part in His Downfall (1973), and the comedy sequel Stand Up, Virgin Soldiers (1977). Cohen's first film production was The London Nobody Knows (1967) narrated by James Mason and his final film was Burning Rubber (1981).

In the Fall of 1982, he directed his only stage production; Woody Allen's Play It Again, Sam at Theatr Clwyd. The cast included; Nic d'avirro, Julia St. John, Julie Richmond, Sara Mason, Carl Davis, Jennifer Franks, and starred Trent Richards (aka Richard Trent) as Allen. The production later toured to Cardiff, where it ran at the Sherman Theatre.

== Death ==
Norman died after suffering a heart attack in 1983.
