= Confessions from a Holiday Camp =

1977 British film by Norman Cohen

- Promotional poster
- Directed by: Norman Cohen
- Written by: Christopher Wood
- Produced by: Greg Smith, Michael Klinger (executive producer)
- Starring: Robin Askwith; Antony Booth; Bill Maynard; Doris Hare; Sheila White
- Cinematography: Ken Hodges
- Edited by: Geoffrey Foot
- Music by: Ed Welch
- Distributed by: Columbia Pictures Industries, Inc.
- Release date: 1 August 1977
- Running time: 88 minutes
- Country: United Kingdom
- Language: English

Confessions from a Holiday Camp is a 1977 British comedy film directed by Norman Cohen and starring Robin Askwith. It was written by Christopher Wood. The film was released in North America in 1978 under the title Confessions of a Summer Camp Counsellor. It is the last film in the series which began with Confessions of a Window Cleaner (1974).

== Plot ==
Timmy Lea and his brother-in-law Sidney Noggett are working as entertainment officers at Funfrall, a typical British holiday camp. The staff are lazy and inefficient, preferring to laze by the pool rather than organise activities for the holiday campers. A new owner, Mr. Whitemonk, an ex-prison officer, takes over the camp and is determined to install discipline into the staff. He is on the verge of dismissing Timmy and Sidney; however, Sidney's suggestion of organising a beauty contest changes his mind.

== Cast ==
- Robin Askwith as Timmy Lea
- Antony Booth as Sidney Noggett
- Bill Maynard as Mr. Lea
- Doris Hare as Mrs. Lea
- Sheila White as Rosie Noggett
- Linda Hayden as Brigitte
- Lance Percival as Lionel
- John Junkin as Mr. Whitemonk
- Liz Fraser as Mrs. Antonia Whitemonk
- Colin Crompton as Roughage
- Nicola Blackman as Blackbird
- Nicholas Bond-Owen as Kevin (as Nicholas Owen)
- Caroline Ellis as Gladys
- Sue Upton as Renee
- Penny Meredith as married woman
- Mike Savage as Kevin's dad
- Janet Edis as Kevin's mum
- Deborah Brayshaw as go-cart girl
- Kim Hardy as announcer
- David Auker as Alberto Smarmi
- John Bryant as young man
- Charlie Stewart as Piper
- Carrie Jones as bikini girl
- Julia Bond as bikini girl
- Betty Hare as mourner
- Winifred Braemar as mourner
- Margo Field as Mrs. Dimwiddy
- Marianne Stone as waitress
- Leonard Woodrow as chaplain
- Lauri Lupino Lane as mayor
- Ingrid Bower as holiday maker
- Robert Booth as holiday maker
- Michael Segal as holiday maker
- Matt Kilroy as chauffeur
- Miriam Margolyes as Blackbird (uncredited)

== Production ==
Producer Michael Klinger was not happy with the script, noting a number of problems that he felt detracted from the quality that set the series apart from its imitators.

The holiday camp used in the film was Mill Rythe Holiday Village on Hayling Island in Hampshire. The railway station scene was filmed at Radlett. The water skiing scene was filmed at Ruislip Lido.

== Soundtrack ==
The title track to the film was called "Give Me England" and was performed by scrumpy and western band The Wurzels, arranged and conducted by Ed Welch and produced by Bob Barratt. It was released as a 45 rpm single by EMI records Ltd (EMI 2677). The Wurzels released an album of the same name in 1977, which featured the track along with its B-Side "Speedy Gonzales".

== Critical reception ==
Monthly Film Bulletin said "A holiday camp provides an all too appropriate backdrop for the strained and patronising low comedy of the relentlessly proliferating Confessions series. This latest addition is as styleless as any Carry On movie, but lacks even the flashes of genial spontaneity which sometimes redeemed that series. The smirking hero's amorous exploits are interspersed with tedious attempts at slapstick and egregious cracks about gays and foreigners. "Give me England every time", blares the xenophobic theme song, yet the film-makers' essentially contemptuous view of home-grown mores is summed up in the presentation of Lea's father, who wears a cloth cap at all times, and when told to use his table napkin, promptly blows his nose on it."

The Radio Times Guide to Films gave the film 1/5 stars, writing: "The Confessions films relied on a blend of saucy humour and "What the Butler Saw"-style smut. This was the fourth and last of these cheap comedies, with Robin Askwith as an over-sexed entertainments officer at a camp run by an ex-prison officer."

Variety wrote: "[The] Confessions series has more than proved its worth at U.K. and assorted Commonwealth boxoffices. Yet understandably none of those working class masquerades (as a window cleaner, a pop performer, a driving instructor) received favorable reviews or were able to easily sell their sniggering, distinctly British humor to foreign markets. Confessions From a Holiday Camp, the series latest ... is no better, no worse, nor any different than its predecessors. Excepting the new profession, the film reprises virtually the same plot, cast, and production team as the former three. That means that Robin Askwith as the innocent Lea and Anthony Booth as his lecherous brother in law Sid go through their usual sex-addled Laurel & Hardy act, but this time in the guise of incompetent entertainment officers at Funfurall Holiday Camp. It also means that Linda Hayden, once again, strips off at every available opportunity. And that the talents of Doris Hare and Bill Maynard as Lea's parents are wasted another time around. Norman Cohen directs with his usual numbing dosage of slapstick, vulgarity, and innuendo."

== Further proposed films in the series ==
Although Holiday Camp would turn out to be the last film in the series, a fifth and a sixth film, Confessions of a Plumber's Mate and Confessions of a Private Soldier, had been planned in 1977. Filming was set to begin on Plumber's Mate at the end of February 1978. Robin Askwith even expressed a desire to direct Private Soldier, but neither film materialised. In November 1977 the studio cancelled plans for future films. Columbia Pictures president David Begelman, who had been very supportive of the British film industry and who had greenlighted the first Confessions film, had been implicated in a cheque-forging scandal and either quit or was fired. His successor had no interest in financing low-budget, profitable British films.

Producer Michael Klinger rejected a script based on Confessions from a Haunted House. Plans to shoot a made-for-video Confessions film in the 1980s also came to nothing, as did a proposed 1992 film, Confessions of a Squaddie, which was proposed with action due to take place in post-Gulf War Kuwait.
