= Light entertainment =

Term for some television and radio programming

"Light entertainment" is a term used in the UK to refer to a broad range of television and radio programming that includes comedies, variety shows, game shows, quiz shows and the like.

== In the UK ==
In the early days of the BBC, virtually all broadcast entertainment would be considered light by today's standards, as great pains were taken not to offend audiences.

Singers, magicians and comedians were drafted from the music hall circuit to fill the schedules. Stage acts were transferred directly to screen; in the case of productions such as Sunday Night at the London Palladium, the broadcasts actually came from large theatres. Many future household names, including The Beatles, were given their first public airings during these programmes, which attempted to cater for varying tastes through staging variety acts. Bruce Forsyth was one of several hosts for the show. He went on himself to present the studio-based Generation Game, which remains a landmark in the light entertainment genre. The Generation Game revolved around the now-common television standby of getting members of the public to provide the entertainment themselves by doing silly things for prizes. The show's format was somewhere between the old variety programmes and the increasingly ubiquitous quiz shows and it and its descendants still appear in the television schedules.

=== 1970s ===
The 1970s continued the move away from the music hall format to studio-based shows. Staged concert acts lived on through television magicians such as Paul Daniels and Royal Variety Performances. The Comedians was another programme which looked back at the live entertainment of the music halls and was also a prototype of many later stand-up comedy series. It employed a number of comics from the working men's club circuit to do their routines on camera.

=== 1980s ===
In the 1980s the budgets available for light entertainment increased, and shows had dazzling sets and expensive prizes. With the simultaneous ascendancy of alternative comedy, however, the popularity of light entertainment shows started to decline among audiences. An example of this phenomenon is found in the name of a lesser-known panel show Bring Me the Head of Light Entertainment (which is also a pun on a broadcasting job description). Part of the complaint was that light entertainment sought to amuse, yet younger audiences found the attempts at humour weak and watery.

=== 1990s ===
Popular light entertainment in the 1990s included Barrymore, Des O'Connor Tonight, Noel's House Party, Surprise Surprise, Stars in Their Eyes and The Paul Daniels Magic Show as well as radio shows such as Wake Up to Wogan. Shows typically averaged over ten million viewers and over fifteen was not unusual.

=== 21st century ===
Light entertainment continues to be popular. Current light entertainment stars include the Geordie double act Ant & Dec. They have in the past included the late Bruce Forsyth and the late Cilla Black. Ant & Dec's Saturday Night Takeaway achieved a viewing figures ratings high of 8.5 million viewers in 2020.

== See also ==
- Broadcasting Act 1990
- Show business
- Cultural industry
- Creative industries
- Cambridge University Light Entertainment Society
- Middlebrow
- Popular culture
