= Vic Fair =

English designer

Vic Fair

Victor Fair (18 March 1938 – 24 February 2017) was an English designer of cinema posters known for his risqué work for low budget 1970s English films.

== Early life ==
Victor Fair was born in Chadwell Heath, Essex, on 18 March 1938. His father is noted as being an instrumental industrial designer for Ford in Dagenham who died when Victor was aged four.

At 16 years old, Victor left school and got a job in London as a messenger boy for the Hector Hughes design agency and attended life drawing classes at St Martin's School of Art in the evening. After Hector Hughes he worked at the Dixons agency.

In the mid-1950s, Fair started his national service in the British Army when he served in Cyprus during the EOKA guerrilla campaign. He could have avoided service, having previously suffered from tuberculosis and other medical conditions, but saw his enlistment as an opportunity to get away from a claustrophobic home life with his mother and sister where he was the man of the house as a result of his father's death. One of his jobs in the army was to search villages for weapons but he was more often to be found sketching the natives.

== Career ==
- Siege of the Saxons (1963)
- Vampire Circus (1972)
- Confessions of a Driving Instructor (1976)
- The Man Who Fell to Earth (1976)
- Harlequin (1980)
- Fort Apache, The Bronx (1981)
- The Beast (1988)
- Graveyard Shift (1990) UK poster

== Death ==
Fair died on 24 February 2017 from the effects of Alzheimer's disease and diabetes. He was survived by his wife and two children.

== See also ==
- Arnaldo Putzu
- Renato Fratini
