= Michael Barrymore =

British television host and comedian (born 1952)

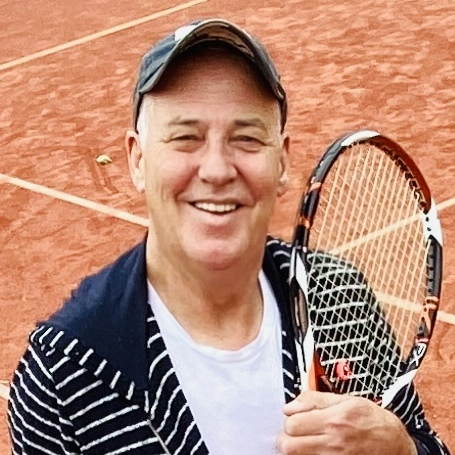
- Barrymore in 2020
- Born: Michael Ciaran Parker; 4 May 1952 (age 74); Bermondsey, London, England
- Spouse: Cheryl Cocklin (m. 1976; div. 1997)

Comedy career
- Years active: 1976–2003, 2006, 2009–2014, 2018–present
- Medium: Stand-up, film, television
- Genres: Observational comedy One-liners; Improvisational comedy Character comedy Physical comedy
- Subject: Everyday life

Michael Ciaran Parker (born 4 May 1952), known by his stage name Michael Barrymore, is an English comedian, influencer and a former television presenter of game shows and light entertainment programmes on British television in the 1980s, 1990s and 2000s. These included Strike It Lucky, My Kind of People, My Kind of Music, Kids Say the Funniest Things, and his own variety show, Barrymore. In 1993, he headlined the Royal Variety Performance.

At his peak, Barrymore was voted the UK's favourite television star several times, and he became one of the highest-paid stars on television from the mid-1980s to the late 1990s. Barrymore subsequently appeared on Celebrity Big Brother and other shows including The Friday Night Project, Graham Norton's Bigger Picture, This Morning, The Sharon Osbourne Show and The Saturday Night Show. He starred in Bob Martin from 2000 to 2001, a comedy drama in which he played the title role of a failing television game-show host.

Barrymore's television career effectively ended after the death of Stuart Lubbock in 2001 following a party at Barrymore's house in Harlow. Barrymore was the subject of police investigations and legal action around the case over several years.

In the 2020s, he has enjoyed a career revival via TikTok, amassing over 4,000,000 followers with videos posted on the social media platform.

== Early life ==
Born Michael Ciaran Parker in Bermondsey, on Sunday, 4 May 1952, he lived on the Dickens estate for the first 18 years of his life with his two elder siblings. His father left when Barrymore was 11 and they never saw each other again. Barrymore and his siblings were raised in the Roman Catholic faith of their Irish mother, Margaret.

== Career ==
=== Early career ===
Barrymore spent his early career working as a Redcoat at Butlins holiday camps and then in the West End theatre shows of London, where he met dancer Cheryl Cocklin in 1974. They married in 1976. With Cheryl as manager and the mastermind behind Barrymore's rise to fame, he first won a 1979 edition of New Faces, became a regular panellist on Blankety Blank and then the warm-up man for Larry Grayson on the Generation Game and also for Little and Large theatre shows. In the early days of his career, Barrymore did impressions of John Cleese and Norman Wisdom, among others.

=== Television career (1976–2001) ===
Barrymore rose to fame via appearances on Blankety Blank and Who Do You Do? and his television career began firstly by having his own sketch show entitled The Michael Barrymore Show in 1983, which starred a young Nicholas Lyndhurst; Barrymore also appeared in Russ Abbot's Madhouse as various characters in 1981 and 1982. Barrymore walked out of his contract with LWT, who produced The Michael Barrymore Show, after only one series; he then landed the presenter's role on the BBC game show Get Set, Go!. He appeared in a number of Royal Variety Performance shows, his first being in 1983. He became the host of ITV gameshow Strike It Lucky (which later became Strike It Rich) in 1986 and it grew in popularity over the years, watched by 18 million viewers at its peak.

This was Barrymore's first successful presenting role (Get Set Go! had been cancelled after only one single series), which led then to his own light entertainment show, Barrymore in 1991. However, before that he had his own show between 1988 and 1989, produced for the BBC entitled Michael Barrymore's Saturday Night Out; it was set in Jersey, and the theme tune, "Doin' the Crab" had been released as a single in 1987.

In 1991, Barrymore was given his own show entitled Barrymore, in which he interviewed guests, performed his comedy routines and joined in with other performers on the show. The show lasted throughout the 1990s right up to 2000, and was consistently nominated for awards over the years in the UK. Among the many famous guests that appeared on Barrymore were Cliff Richard, Uri Geller, and Spike Milligan.

Following his appearance on the 1993 Royal Variety Performance, where he performed a version of "Will You Still Love Me Tomorrow" with soldiers, he became popular on television and on the stage. He became well known through his catchphrases of "Awight!", on making his entrance, and on Strike It Lucky, "Top, middle or bottom?" and "What is a hot spot not?", to which the studio audience would reply "a good spot".

Following on from the success, Barrymore had a very public battle with substance abuse. He went into rehab due to his alcohol and drug addiction in 1994. He left after a couple of months and went on to write a best-selling book about his experiences, including rehab, and he also went on a stage tour called Back in Business in 1994.

He then regained his former status and made another series of Barrymore and recorded a new series called My Kind of People. He came out as gay on 19 August 1995 and divorced his wife in 1997. He made a new series of Strike It Lucky, now called Strike It Rich and another Barrymore series. More editions of Strike It Rich and Barrymore were shown in 1997 and he also appeared in Spice World as Mr. Step.

A spin-off talent show, My Kind of People, and game show, My Kind of Music, followed the success of both Barrymore and Strike It Rich. Following a dip in ratings, Barrymore was cancelled in 1997 (it later returned in 2000). He went on to new projects with Kids Say the Funniest Things, Animals Do the Funniest Things and Barrymore on Broadway. He was voted the UK's favourite TV star several times, and became one of the highest-paid stars on TV. Barrymore won the National Television Award for Most Popular Entertainment Presenter five out of the first six years, lastly at the 6th NTAs in 2000.

He recorded two new series called My Kind of Music and Kids Say the Funniest Things in 1998, along with more episodes of Strike It Rich. Newer editions of all three series were shown, and another series of Barrymore was recorded and broadcast in 2000. That year also saw Barrymore move into acting in Bob Martin, in which he played the character of Bob Martin; he recorded two series of the comedy (2000–01). Barrymore also presented a second series of Kids Say the Funniest Things, which aired in late 2000, and also a fourth series of My Kind of Music, which was on the air at the time that Stuart Lubbock died in Barrymore's pool on 31 March 2001. Following Lubbock's death, both Bob Martin and My Kind of Music stayed on air while the investigation was ongoing, but he did not record any further programmes for ITV. They constantly backed him when asked by the newspapers, and simply waited for investigations to conclude. In October 2001, Barrymore was given a drugs caution, and began recording a new series of My Kind of Music.

== Death of Stuart Lubbock ==
=== Party ===
Following a party at Barrymore's house in Essex in the early hours of 31 March 2001, a 31-year-old man, Stuart Lubbock, was discovered unconscious in Barrymore's swimming pool. Three witnesses – including Barrymore – claimed to have found him motionless in the pool. Witnesses disagreed on whether Lubbock was found floating on top of the pool or at the bottom. Barrymore had said he was on top of the pool. Lubbock, described as a "bubbly partygoer", had traces of drugs including alcohol in his system. In the postmortem, pathologists discovered severe anal injuries, which several experts, including senior Home Office pathologist Nathaniel Cary, later agreed were consistent with a sexual assault.

Many tabloid newspapers accused Barrymore of holding drug-fuelled orgies in his home and asserted he had some responsibility for the death. Kylie Merritt, a partygoer, initially claimed that Barrymore had been seen at the party rubbing cocaine onto Lubbock's gums, an allegation Barrymore denied. Merritt later admitted she was not sure she had seen Barrymore rubbing cocaine onto Lubbock's gums.

=== Arrest and inquest ===
Barrymore received a police caution for possession and use of cannabis. Barrymore and two other people at the party, Justin Merritt and Jonathan Kenney, were arrested on suspicion of murder on 6 June 2001. No other charges were laid against him or anyone else in connection with the death. The inquest that took place in September 2002 reached an open verdict. In light of the verdict, Cheryl Barrymore was approached by a friend of the Lubbock family. She provided the family's solicitor with both an affidavit and subsequent court testimony that her ex-husband had lied under oath, and could in fact swim; she also alleged he had rubbed cocaine onto the gums of other people as well as his own.

In November 2002, Barrymore's lawyers successfully demanded that Essex Police re-investigate matters surrounding Lubbock's death. Their focus was on Barrymore's allegations that the injuries inflicted upon Lubbock's body could have occurred while it was lying unguarded in the mortuary. A pathologist's report found that Lubbock's wounds were only four hours old at the time of the examination at 4 pm, while Lubbock had been pronounced dead at the Princess Alexandra Hospital in Harlow at 8.20 am that morning. Barrymore told BBC Radio 5 Live: "We want to prove the fact that the anal injuries could not have happened at the house." He added: "If these injuries had happened then, why have the police not charged anyone with anything?" An investigation into these claims by Essex Police in 2003 found "no evidence" to support them, instead concluding there was "strong evidence" the injuries were sustained before the arrival of paramedics.

=== Private prosecution ===
On Barrymore's high-profile return to the UK in January 2006 to take part in Celebrity Big Brother, former solicitor, politician and local activist Anthony Bennett initiated a private prosecution, comprising six charges regarding Barrymore's alleged misuse of drugs on the night of Stuart Lubbock's death. The action commenced in Epping Magistrates' Court in January 2006 and, on 10 February 2006, a District Judge at Southend Magistrates' Court blocked the private prosecution against Barrymore on the grounds of insufficient evidence. Bennett was no longer a solicitor and was acting independently of Terry Lubbock, Stuart's father.

=== Reopened investigation ===
In an interview with Piers Morgan in the December 2006 edition of GQ, Barrymore stated there were other witnesses to the events who were hiding information. On 2 December 2006, police announced they would reopen the investigation into Lubbock's death after receiving a lengthy dossier submitted by Bennett, now Terry Lubbock's solicitor. The dossier described a series of alleged failures by Essex Police in the original investigation, and claimed an elaborate coverup of the true circumstances of Lubbock's death had taken place.

=== Complaints processes ===
On 22 December 2006, following a successful complaint to the Press Complaints Commission by Bennett, The Sun published a letter from Terry Lubbock replying to the newspaper's five-page feature on Barrymore earlier in the year which featured Terry's meeting with Barrymore.

On 1 March 2007, the Independent Police Complaints Commission (IPCC), following a complaint lodged the previous December by Terry Lubbock, announced an investigation into aspects of the police inquiry into Lubbock's death after receiving complaints from the Lubbock family. It was reported that complaints surrounded information Essex Police gave to a coroner and pathologist after Lubbock's death. In May the IPCC agreed with Terry Lubbock a schedule of 36 separate complaints relating to the original investigation into Lubbock's death.

=== Further arrests ===
On 14 June 2007, Essex Police arrested Barrymore and two other men on suspicion of murder and sexual assault in the Lubbock case. The two other men arrested were Jonathan Kenney, Barrymore's partner at the time of the death, and Justin Merritt, an unemployed former dustman at the time, all present at the party when Lubbock died. The three men were held for questioning at South Woodham Ferrers police station.

This followed reports in The Harlow Herald that police had seized tapes from the home of Barrymore's literary agent, Tony Cowell, allegedly containing conversations between Cowell and Barrymore.

On 15 June 2007, police were given permission to question Barrymore and one other man for a further 12 hours. Barrymore's solicitor Henri Brandman confirmed his client was one of the men arrested. Later that day Barrymore was released on police bail pending further enquiries. His solicitor stated that Barrymore "categorically denied" the allegations made and had not been charged with any offence.

=== Investigation dropped ===
On 31 July 2007, it was announced that Barrymore had been re-bailed to appear at an Essex Police station on 10 September. He answered bail on 10 September at Harlow police station. Police were then granted a further 12 hours to question him. On that date, Barrymore and the other two men were told that they would not face charges for the events that occurred. The case was left open. In July 2008 Lubbock's father published the book Not Awight: Getting Away With Murder, co-authored with Bennett, explaining their theory that Stuart had died as a result of a violent attack on him, which Barrymore and his associates that night covered up.

=== Civil action ===
In July 2015, Barrymore sued Essex Police for wrongful arrest, valuing his claim for damages at more than £2.4 million. Essex Police subsequently acknowledged that Barrymore had been wrongfully arrested, although this was due to administrative errors and not to a lack of evidence.

In August 2017, the High Court in London ruled that Barrymore would be entitled to "more than nominal" damages against Essex Police. This decision was overturned in 2019 by the Court of Appeal which ruled that he would be entitled only to "nominal" damages. Essex Police subsequently announced that Barrymore had dropped his compensation claim and that no payments had been made to him.

=== Renewed appeal ===
On 4 February 2020, Essex Police offered a £20,000 reward for information leading to a conviction. The cash reward, funded by Essex Police and the charity Crimestoppers, was in response to a new Channel 4 documentary on the incident, Barrymore: The Body in the Pool, which subsequently aired on 6 February 2020.

On 17 March 2021, nearly 20 years after Lubbock's death, Essex Police confirmed that they had arrested a 50-year-old man from Cheshire on suspicion of indecent assault and murder. He was later released without charge.

== Career revivals ==
Following the revelation of Lubbock's death, ITV terminated Barrymore's contract and his television career collapsed. A new series of Kids Say the Funniest Things recorded prior to the scandal was pulled from the ITV schedule and never broadcast. The Guardian reported that the BBC cancelled publication of Barrymore's life story. In September 2003, Barrymore staged a one-man show at London's Wyndham's Theatre, which closed after a few days. He subsequently emigrated to New Zealand to live with his partner, Shaun Davis. Barrymore has since had live stage shows in New Zealand and Australia. In 2005, he appeared in Chicago in Napier, New Zealand.

=== Celebrity Big Brother ===
In December 2005, it was announced that Barrymore was being paid £150,000 by Channel 4 to take part in Celebrity Big Brother, commencing on 5 January 2006. He had a difficult relationship with housemate George Galloway, which culminated in a 20-minute heated argument between the two men. On 27 January 2006, Barrymore finished the show as runner-up to Chantelle Houghton.

=== After Celebrity Big Brother ===
Remaining in the UK, Barrymore was booked to be the guest host on Channel 4's The Friday Night Project for the edition broadcast on 3 February 2006. The months following Barrymore's appearance on Big Brother were full of speculation that Barrymore was in talks with a number of television channels over the possibility of new shows, but nothing ever came of this. Barrymore's appearance on the Friday Night Project is the last time he presented a primetime television show.

It was announced that for Christmas 2006, Barrymore would play the title role in Bill Kenwright's production of Scrooge – The Musical. He performed the lead role at the Empire Theatre, Sunderland, but the production's scheduled transfer to the West End was cancelled. In January 2008, Barrymore took the role of comedian and writer Spike Milligan in the stage play Surviving Spike. It played in Windsor and later the Edinburgh Fringe, but again, its West End transfer was cancelled. In February 2010, he appeared on Irish television on The Saturday Night Show, where he unexpectedly performed numerous bizarre and controversial antics, including pretending to be Jedward's father.

In May 2010, Barrymore startled his co-contestants on a reality TV show by revealing that he had fallen in love with a woman. Barrymore was filming an episode of Channel 4 show Come Dine with Me, with former Generation Game host Anthea Redfern and presenters Pat Sharp and Jenny Powell, when he said he was going to have a party to celebrate that he was "coming back in".

Barrymore's personal publicity, particularly in the tabloid press, continued to be negative. In December 2011, he was convicted of cocaine possession and fined £780.

In 2013, Barrymore appeared on the RTÉ programme The Saturday Night Show, where he discussed his harsh treatment by the press, his addiction and also the possibility of a new show called My Kind of Twits. He subsequently claimed on Twitter that a pilot for My Kind of Twits would be filmed in May, but this did not happen. Barrymore also appeared on The Nolan Show in June 2013.

In March 2019, Barrymore appeared on Piers Morgan's Life Stories. In September 2019, it was announced that Barrymore would take part in the 12th series of ITV's Dancing on Ice, starting in January 2020. However, on 18 December 2019, he had to withdraw because of a broken hand, and was replaced by former Blue Peter presenter Radzi Chinyanganya.

In recent years, Barrymore has enjoyed a career resurgence via the social media platform TikTok. As of June 2026, he has amassed 4.4m followers on TikTok. It has been reported that his content, which he began posting in 2022, particularly resonates with younger Generation Z audiences.

== Personal life ==
Barrymore met Cheryl Cocklin in 1974 while she was a dancer in a West End theatre show. They married in 1976.

Cocklin became his manager and was the mastermind behind Barrymore's rise to fame. She later said that Barrymore had problems with alcohol and depression, and as a result of his attack on her at the Hotel Bel-Air in Los Angeles, she was placed by British police on the "at risk" register.

At the height of his popularity, Barrymore suffered increasing alcohol problems. He claims that he wanted to seek help, but that Cocklin continually told him "No, you're not (alcoholic). Don't be stupid."

In August 2025, Barrymore revealed that he had suffered a stroke which caused him to develop epilepsy. In discussing his epilepsy, he stated that his epilepsy comes in the form of cluster seizures and will have several in a row.

=== Sexuality ===
On 19 August 1995, at the height of his fame, Barrymore went to The White Swan gay pub in London's East End, where he gave an impromptu stage performance to the largely local crowd, singing the words: "Start spreading the news, I'm gay today", in the style of the "Theme from New York, New York". Within 48 hours, every tabloid newspaper had printed its own version of the evening's events, including an untrue claim that Barrymore had thrown away his wedding ring.

Two-weeks later, Barrymore attended the National Television Awards. At an after-show party on a live late night radio show, he publicly declared he was gay and "no longer wanted to live a lie", following which he broke up with Cocklin. She later claimed Barrymore took the step and did not tell her because of his talks with Diana, Princess of Wales.

=== Divorce ===
After several aborted reunions, Barrymore and Cocklin divorced in 1997. In 2002, she published her autobiography, Catch a Falling Star, which described their acrimonious split. They subsequently had no contact. In his 2006 autobiography Awight Now: Setting the Record Straight, Barrymore claimed that Cocklin was a "control freak" who determined his every move, including the clothes he wore, and that she created "the character that was Michael Barrymore", consequently driving him to alcohol, drugs and gay affairs. In a 2002 interview, he said he was an alcoholic and was in recovery.

On 1 April 2005, Cocklin died of lung cancer, aged 55, at the Hospital of St John and St Elizabeth in St John's Wood.

== Filmography ==
Transmitted	Title	Role	Channel	Notes
1976	Who Do You Do?	Himself	BBC	Barrymore appeared and did impressions, as was the norm for this show.
1977	Seaside Special	Performer	ITV	
1981–1982	Russ Abbot's Madhouse	Various characters	ITV	
1982	Give Us a Clue	Performer	BBC	
1983	Punchlines	Performer		
1983	The Michael Barrymore Show	Various characters	ITV	Cancelled after Barrymore walked out of his contract with Thames.
1984	Get Set Go!	Presenter	BBC	Quiz show. Cancelled following one series.
1984	Starting from Now	Presenter	Unaired	Pilot episode of a game show
1984	Surprise, Surprise	Guest	ITV	
1984	Tarby and Friends	Guest performer	ITV	
1984	Jackanory	Storyteller	BBC	Barrymore read out a story.
1985	The Laughter Show	Performer		
1985	Something to Treasure	Performer		
1985	Kenny Everett's Christmas Carol	Performer	BBC	Kenny Everett's Christmas special
1986	Sebastian the Incredible Drawing Dog	Mick	BBC	Full series made for children's TV where Barrymore plays Mick who has a dog called Sebastian who is his friend.
1986	Saturday Live	Host	Channel 4	Barrymore hosted one episode in 1986.
1986	All Star Secrets	Guest performer		
1986	Live from Her Majesty's	Performer	ITV	
1986–1994	Strike It Lucky	Presenter	ITV	Attracted up to 20 million viewers at its peak and shot Barrymore to stardom.
1987	The Michael Barrymore Special	Himself	ITV	
1987	The Royal Variety Performance 1987	Performer	ITV	
1988–1989	Michael Barrymore's Saturday Night Out	Himself	BBC	
1989	The TV Times TOP TEN Awards	Presenter	ITV	Barrymore hosted the show.
1989	Sunday Sunday	Interviewee	ITV	Barrymore was interviewed on this show.
1989	Des O'Connor Tonight	Interviewee	ITV	
1989	Comedy Christmas Box	Performer		
1990	Match Game	Guest	ABC	
1990	Mick and Mac	Mick	Children's BBC	Children's television show.
1990	ITV Telethon 90	Performer	ITV	
1990	A Night of One Hundred Stars	Performer		
1991–1997, 2000	Barrymore	Presenter	ITV	Barrymore was nominated for numerous TV awards.
1992	This Morning	Interviewee	ITV	Barrymore was talking about his career and role in pantomime as Buttons in Cinderella at the Manchester Opera House.
1993	It'll Be Alright on the Night 7	Performer	ITV	A 60-minute show that features outtakes and mistakes from TV, film and advertisements.
1995	My Kind of People	Presenter	ITV	Spin off from Barrymore. Cancelled after one series and returned to 5-minute segment on Barrymore.
1996–1999	Michael Barrymore's Strike It Rich	Presenter	ITV	Rebranding of Strike It Lucky. Nominated for numerous TV awards between 1996 and 1999.
1997	Spice World	Mr. Step		Spice Girls film.
1998–2000	Kids Say the Funniest Things	Presenter	ITV	Barrymore spoke to children about their views on life.
1998–2002	Michael Barrymore's My Kind of Music	Presenter	ITV	
1999–2000	Animals Do the Funniest Things	Presenter	ITV	.
2000	Barrymore on Broadway	Presenter	ITV	Followed Barrymore in America speaking to musical stars. Three part series.
2000	Michael Barrymore: My Favourite Christmas Hymns	Himself	ITV	Barrymore chooses his favourite Christmas hymns.
2000–2001	Bob Martin	Bob Martin	ITV	Comedy series where Barrymore played the lead character; Bob Martin. Ran for two series.
2002	GMTV	Himself – interviewee	ITV	Interviewed by Fiona Phillips in Dubai.
2003	The Salon	Himself	E4	
2006	Celebrity Big Brother	Himself – contestant	Channel 4	
2006	Friday Night Project	Guest presenter	Channel 4	Guest presenter of one episode in February 2006.
2009	Big Brother's Little Brother	Roving reporter	Channel 4	Roving reporter during the 2009 edition of Celebrity Big Brother.
2010	The House That Made Me	Himself – guest	Channel 4	Guest appearance in one episode that dealt with Barrymore's childhood.
2010	Celebrity Come Dine with Me	Himself	Channel 4	Appeared alongside Pat Sharp, Anthea Turner and Jenny Powell.
2011	Celebrity Coach Trip	Contestant	Channel 4	Appeared with former producer Maurice Leonard.
2013	The Saturday Night Show	Interviewee	RTÉ One	Barrymore was interviewed for at least 10 minutes, he discussed his fall from grace and the possibility of a new show called My Kind of Twits.
2013	The Nolan Show	Interviewee	BBC NI	Barrymore was interviewed for 30 minutes, discussing his life story.
2013	This Morning	Interviewee	ITV	Barrymore was interviewed on Money Matters explaining his rise to stardom and his fall and how it affected both his money and his life.
2014	The Jeremy Kyle Show: The Celebrity Specials	Interviewee	ITV	Barrymore discussed the highs and lows of his life – with Jeremy Kyle.
2018	Larry Grayson: Shut That Door!	Himself	ITV3	
2019	Piers Morgan's Life Stories	Guest Interviewee	ITV	Barrymore was interviewed about the high and lows of his life and career as well as Stuart Lubbock's death investigation and events before then, with Piers Morgan.
2023	This Morning	Guest Interviewee	ITV	Barrymore was interviewed about his career and co-directing West End play Laurel & Chaplin: The Feud.

== Stand-up videos ==
Title	Released	Notes
The Unpredictable... Live	19 September 1994	Live at Blackpool Opera House
Live And Uplifting – Back in Business! – Live at the Hammersmith Apollo	9 November 1998	Live at London's Hammersmith Apollo
