= Adolf Hitler: My Part in His Downfall (film) =

1972 film directed by Norman Cohen

Adolf Hitler: My Part in his Downfall
- Theatrical release poster
- Directed by: Norman Cohen
- Written by: Spike Milligan; Johnny Byrne; Norman Cohen
- Produced by: Norman Cohen; Greg Smith
- Starring: Jim Dale; Arthur Lowe; Bill Maynard; Tony Selby; Geoffrey Hughes; John Forgeham; Spike Milligan; Pat Coombs; Windsor Davies; Bob Todd; Jim Norton
- Cinematography: Terry Maher
- Edited by: Tony Lenny
- Music by: Wilfred Burns; Ed Welch; Spike Milligan
- Production company: Associated London Films
- Distributed by: United Artists
- Release date: January 1973 (London)
- Running time: 102 minutes
- Country: United Kingdom
- Language: English

Adolf Hitler: My Part in His Downfall is a 1973 British comedy film directed by Norman Cohen and starring Jim Dale, Arthur Lowe and Spike Milligan. It was adapted by Milligan, Cohen and Johnny Byrne from "Adolf Hitler: My Part in His Downfall" the first volume of Milligan's autobiography. Dale was nominated for the 1974 BAFTA Award for Most Promising Newcomer to Leading Film Roles for his performance.

== Outline ==
Although it broadly follows Milligan's book, some scenes were created for the film and all of the character names (apart from the Milligan family) are fictional. Aspiring jazz musician Terence "Spike" Milligan reluctantly obeys his call-up and joins the Royal Artillery at Bexhill-on-Sea, where he begins training to take part in the Second World War. Along the way Spike and his friends get involved in many amusing – and some not-so amusing – scrapes.

== Cast ==
- Jim Dale as Spike Milligan
- Arthur Lowe as Major Jack Drysdale
- Bill Maynard as Sergeant Ellis
- Tony Selby as Bill Neil
- Geoffrey Hughes as Larry Walters
- Jim Norton as Pongo
- John Forgeham as Wally Watkins
- Windsor Davies as Sergeant McKay
- Spike Milligan as Leo Milligan (Spike's father)
- Pat Coombs as Florence Milligan (Spike's mother)
- Bob Todd as Bill Thompson, the Referee at the boxing bout
- Gregory Phillips as Desmond Milligan (Spike's brother)
- Alvar Liddell as himself (news broadcaster)
- Robert Longden as Heavenly Bliss

== Reception ==
The Monthly Film Bulletin wrote,

It was a grave error to cast Spike Milligan as his own father in a screen version of his autobiographical novel of wartime experiences. His two brief appearances throw the rest of the film out of balance like an anarchist's bomb ... Jim Dale makes a brave stab, but his funniness is of a different order. ... Apart from the central weakness, the film has a convincing period shabbiness and sleaziness which are endearing when they're not overstated. ... The blowing up of Gunner Bliss – dubbed "Heavenly" with ironic foresight – is milked for throwaway horror and pathos. ...Tin-hatted silhouettes of anxious men, Jennings-like, contemplate a livid sky. As the bombs fall on London, one gunner remarks, 'I feel so bloody helpless'; to which comes the bitter retort, "Don't worry, mate, those civilians'll fight your war for you": no prizes for guessing that one of them loses his entire family in the bombing that night. There is also a kind of disused quarry which keeps cropping up on manoeuvres and cross-country runs, and which is heavily underlined as a symbolic prefiguring of the battlefield. Apart from these lapses of tone, Adolf Hitler . . . is a decent, anti-war, pro-life film, enriched by the comic gifts of Bill Maynard and Windsor Davies, though with Arthur Lowe's role as a professional Captain Mainwaring sadly underwritten.
