= Confessions of a Driving Instructor =

1976 British film by Norman Cohen

- Theatrical release poster by Vic Fair
- Directed by: Norman Cohen
- Written by: Christopher Wood
- Produced by: Greg Smith; Michael Klinger (executive producer)
- Starring: Robin Askwith; Anthony Booth; Doris Hare; Bill Maynard; Sheila White; Windsor Davies; Liz Fraser; Irene Handl; George Layton; Lynda Bellingham
- Cinematography: Ken Hodges
- Edited by: Geoffrey Foot
- Music by: Ed Welch
- Distributed by: Columbia Pictures
- Release date: 12 September 1976
- Running time: 90 minutes
- Country: United Kingdom
- Language: English

Confessions of a Driving Instructor is a 1976 British sex-farce film directed by Norman Cohen and starring Robin Askwith and Anthony Booth. It was written by Christopher Wood.

It was the third instalment of the Confessions series, based on the novels by Wood (as Timothy Lea).

== Plot ==
Timothy Lea joins his brother-in-law's driving school. Their school is soon in rivalry with a competing school, while Timothy finds himself involved in erotic adventures with his clients, secretary and landlady. His clients are a mix of the inept and the dangerous and mayhem ensues. A rugby match is organised between the two schools, at which one of the rival school's instructors unknowingly swallows a powerful aphrodisiac and rampages around the field, an event that leads to the climactic car chase.

== Cast ==
- Robin Askwith as Timothy Lea
- Anthony Booth as Sidney Noggett
- Bill Maynard as Walter Lea
- Doris Hare as Mrs Lea
- Sheila White as Rosie Noggett
- Windsor Davies as Mr Truscott
- Liz Fraser as Mrs Chalmers
- Irene Handl as Miss Slenderparts
- George Layton as Tony Bender
- Lynda Bellingham as Mary Truscott
- Avril Angers as Mrs. Truscott
- Maxine Casson as Avril Chalmers
- Chrissy Iddon as Lady Snodley
- John Junkin as Luigi
- Donald Hewlett as chief examiner
- Sally Faulkner as Mrs. Dent
- Ballard Berkeley as Lord Snodley
- Suzy Mandel as Mrs Hargreaves
- Damaris Hayman as tweedy golfing lady
- Geoffrey Hughes as postman
- Daniel Chamberlain as Jason Noggett
- Lewis Collins as rugby player

== Critical reception ==
The Monthly Film Bulletin wrote: "A fifth-rate potboiler of proven commercial value. Considering all the whiskery gags and double entendres wheeled out in this episode of the Cohen-Wood Confessions, it is surprising that Miss Slenderparts' reckless driving is the single example of a woman-driver joke (which is incidentally amusing only because the stuntperson substituting for Irene Handl is so plainly a burly man). More dispiriting than the ingenuous hero's three or four mannerisms (an apprehensive glance, a tug at the underpants, an empty grin) is the misguided enthusiasm displayed by both old and new hands."

The South China Morning Post wrote: "If anything, Driving Instructor is even more crass than its predecessor but it is, to be honest, a lot more fun. Instead of stringing together a whole lot of vaguely connected incidents of an indecent nature, the film-makers have this time created a fairly firm frame-work of events with a recognisable story-line and a discernible build-up to a climax. The whole thing is, still rather flimsy, of course, but the characters are more interesting and so, therefore, are the things that happen to them. Some sequences are actually hilarious. Others are quite delightful."

Screen International wrote: "Ribald, vulgar and robustly good-humoured, the Confessions films present sex and nudity with the cheerful effrontery that the average British cinemagoer recognises and does not fear. ... To list the repetitive gags which lead so inexorably to displays of bottoms and boobs and pubic hair does the film less than justice. All these scenes are played at a jolly romp pace more Olympic than erotic; and Robin Askwith's Timmy Lea is no woman-exploiting lecher but a role-reversed victim of lustful ladies who pounce with a boisterous abandon that provokes belly laughs rather than sniggers. Strictly speaking, the film style is traditional end-of-pier low farce with plenty of slapstick and set piece comedy sketches; the nude scenes are kept within the acceptance limits of nice uncomplicated people who enjoy the mild titillation but would be shocked and embarrassed if subjected to a turn-on treatment. The running single joke of Timmy's irresistible allure is kept in its place by the less basic comedy put over by the strong cast of character actors who are given the best lines."
