= Strike It Lucky =

British television game show (1986–1999)

- Also known as: Michael Barrymore's Strike It Rich (1996–99)
- Genre: Game show
- Created by: Kline & Friends
- Presented by: Michael Barrymore
- Announcer: John Benson; Robin Houston; Nick Jackson
- Country of origin: United Kingdom
- Original language: English
- No. of series: 13
- No. of episodes: 209

Production
- Production locations: Teddington Studios (1986–92); Pinewood Studios (1993–94); The London Studios (1996–99)
- Running time: 30 minutes (inc. adverts)
- Production companies: Thames in association with Talbot Television and Blair Entertainment's Kline & Friends Inc. (1986–94); LWT and Fremantle (UK) Productions (Grundy) (1996–99)

Original release
- Network: ITV
- Release: 29 October 1986 – 23 August 1999

Related
- Strike It Rich (US version)

Strike It Lucky (later known as Michael Barrymore's Strike It Rich from 1996 to 1999) is a British television game show that ran from 29 October 1986 to 23 August 1999, originally produced by Thames Television for ITV, and presented by the British comedian Michael Barrymore. It was based on the American game show Strike It Rich that aired in 1986.

== Format ==
=== Main game ===
Three teams of two competed to win cash and prizes. One member of each team stood at the podium to answer questions, while the other moved along a path lined with 10 television monitors. Each team had its own path, and the moving contestants started at the first monitor, needing a total of nine steps to reach the other end. The team in control was given a category and a list of six answers, and the answering contestant chose to play two, three, or four questions. Correct answers were removed from the list as they were used. The teammate of the contestant answering the final question correctly gained the right to move one step ahead per question – as an incorrect answer gave the next team in line a chance to steal control by answering the same question and any that followed it. If all three teams missed the same question, the category was thrown out and a new one was offered to the team that originally had control.

When a team finished answering the questions, the moving contestant advanced one step at a time and pressed the button below each monitor to reveal either a prize (merchandise or cash) or a Hot Spot (between five and eight altogether). If a prize was revealed, the team could either bank it and end their turn, or risk it and take another step if they had earned any more. Finding a Hot Spot forfeited all un-banked prizes and ended the turn. If a team completed all their moves without finding a Hot Spot, all prizes found on that turn were automatically banked. Once a team's turn ended for any reason, the next team in line played.

A team on the sixth or seventh step could not ask for any number of questions that would take them past the ninth one, and had to stop there if they reached it after stealing control from an opponent. A team on the eighth step could only play two questions and had to stop at the ninth one if they answered both correctly. The ninth step of each team's path always contained a prize more valuable than the others, often a holiday trip. Once a team reached this point, they had a choice to either end the turn and bank the prizes, or to attempt one final open-ended question for which conferring was allowed. If they attempted the question on that same turn and missed, they forfeited the un-banked prizes and had to answer a new question on their next turn. The first team to correctly answer their final question won the game, banked any prizes still at risk, and advanced to the bonus round. If time was called before a team reached the ninth step, the team in last place was eliminated and the second-place team moved up to the same position as the leaders. These two teams were asked one final tiebreaker question; the first to answer correctly won the game.

Teams kept all cash and prizes they banked during the game. If a team finished with nothing in the bank, they received a consolation prize. In early episodes, this was a bottle of champagne. Later, Barrymore would either reveal the next two prizes along the team's path and award these, or allow the team to keep the last set of prizes they had lost to a Hot Spot. From the fourth through the seventh series, all teams also received a Strike It Lucky board game.

=== Bonus round ===
The bonus round used all 30 monitors lining the three paths. Ten each of arrows, Hot Spots, and true/false questions were shuffled and hidden among the monitors. At the outset, the team bid on how few Hot Spots they believed they would hit during the round (two, three, or four); the lower their bid, the more money was at stake. They advanced one step at a time, choosing the top, middle, or bottom monitor at each step. Arrows represented safe moves, while a correct answer or miss on a question turned it into an arrow or Hot Spot, respectively.

If the team completed all 10 steps without exceeding their bid of Hot Spots, they won the cash prize for that bid. The game would be ended early as a win if a team reached a point at which it would no longer be possible to exceed their bid. These prizes were £2,000/£1,500/£1,000 for the first three series of Strike It Lucky, increased to £3,000/£2,000/£1,000 for the fourth through eighth series, and again to £5,000/£4,000/£3,000 for the ninth. When the series was retitled Strike It Rich, the prizes were £10,000/£7,000/£5,000.

From the fourth through the ninth series, teams who failed to win their jackpot received 10% of its value for every safe step they took before exceeding their bid (£300/£200/£100, then £500/£400/£300). On Strike It Rich, the consolation was 5% per step (£500/£350/£250).

== Transmissions ==
Series	Start date	End date	Episodes
1	29 October 1986	31 December 1986	10
2	15 April 1987	24 June 1987	10
3	17 September 1987	28 January 1988	20
4	4 October 1988	14 February 1989	20
5	25 December 1989	4 June 1990	21
6	25 September 1990	12 February 1991	20
7	23 September 1991	26 December 1991	13
8	21 September 1992	28 December 1992	13
9	27 September 1993	29 December 1994	28
10	12 December 1996	3 April 1997	16
11	8 September 1997 (Note: Series 11 was due to start on 1 September 1997, but was postponed by a week due to the death of Diana, Princess of Wales.)	29 December 1997	16
12	17 September 1998	26 November 1998	10
13	7 June 1999	23 August 1999	12

=== Ratings ===
==== Series 12 ====
Episode no.	Air date	Viewers (millions)	ITV weekly ranking
1	17 September 1998	6.31	27
2	24 September 1998	6.49	25
3	1 October 1998	—N/a	—N/a
4	8 October 1998	7.03	27
5	15 October 1998	7.02	28
6	22 October 1998	—N/a	—N/a
7	5 November 1998	—N/a	—N/a
8	12 November 1998	6.96	28
9	19 November 1998	7.49	25
10	26 November 1998	7.77	26

==== Series 13 ====
Episode no.	Air date	Viewers (millions)	ITV weekly ranking
1	7 June 1999	8.05	13
2	14 June 1999	7.29	14
3	21 June 1999	7.36	15
4	28 June 1999	7.40	17
5	5 July 1999	6.92	17
6	12 July 1999	6.24	23
7	19 July 1999	7.15	17
8	26 July 1999	6.79	14
9	2 August 1999	7.31	17
10	9 August 1999	6.72	20
11	16 August 1999	6.88	18
12	23 August 1999	6.33	20
