= My Kind of Music =

- Genre: Game show
- Presented by: Michael Barrymore
- Country of origin: United Kingdom
- Original language: English
- No. of series: 5
- No. of episodes: 49 (7 unaired)

Production
- Running time: 60 minutes (inc. adverts)
- Production company: LWT

Original release
- Network: ITV
- Release: 8 February 1998 – 29 March 2002

Related
- My Kind of People

My Kind of Music is a British game show that aired on ITV from 8 February 1998 to 29 March 2002, hosted by Michael Barrymore.

The show's main theme, of which presenter Michael Barrymore sang some of the lyrics when appearing at the very start, was originally sung by Robert Palmer in 1978.

Three teams of two people would test their musical knowledge against one another, with the winning team going on to win up to £13,000 in the jackpot; by the fourth series, this had been increased to £16,000.

== Format ==
=== Opening Song ===
Once the teams were introduced, one contestant (or sometimes both) from each team would perform a song. The two remaining teams were then each asked a question related to the song, worth £50 for a correct answer. In the first series, this was the second round of the game rather than the first.

=== Musical Knowledge ===
In this round, Barrymore asked a series of quickfire music questions on the buzzer, each worth £50. An incorrect answer would freeze a team out of the rest of the question. On some occasions, if none of the teams knew the answer to a question, Barrymore would offer £50 to a member of the audience if answered correctly. This round was not played in the first series.

=== Pick the Picture ===
Nine pictures of various celebrities would appear on a video wall. A song was then played and the contestants had to guess which picture connected the song that was being played. In the first series, this was played as the opening round with £50 for every correct answer; in series two, it was moved to the fourth round of the game, with correct answers now worth £150.

=== Pop Props ===
From Series 3, Pick the Picture was replaced with Pop Props. On each turn, Barrymore would collect some items hidden behind a jukebox and then show them to the contestants. These were visual clues represented to a well-known song. Correct answers were worth £100.

=== My Kind of People ===
Contestants were shown a film of Barrymore inviting members of the public to sing in front of an audience at an outside location, usually a large shopping centre. After the film, Barrymore asked a series of questions to test the contestants' memory and observation. In the first two series, this was the third round of the game, with correct answers worth £100. When Pop Props was introduced in series three, this became the fourth round and the money increased to £150 for each correct answer.

=== Vox Pops ===
Contestants were shown descriptive clues to a song title read out by members of the public, each clue being worth a decreasing amount of money, which started at £250 and reduced by £50 for each clue. When a contestant thought he or she knew the answer, he or she had to write it and then hit their buzzer. The team or teams that answered correctly for the highest amount of money won the amount they had locked their answer in for. At the end of the round, the lowest scoring team was eliminated, leaving with whatever money they had earned. This round was played in the first series only.

=== Sing the Song ===
From series two, Vox Pops was replaced by Sing the Song. Contestants on each team took it in turns to sing a famous song of a well known artist. Their team-mate stood behind the video wall and had to guess which artist they were singing. Each correct answer was worth £150 and both pairs of contestants changed places after each song. Each team was allowed to pass up to three times only, and that team's turn would end once they had run out of passes. At the end of this round, the lowest scoring team was eliminated, leaving with whatever money they had earned.

=== Musical Interlude ===
Following the Vox Pops round in series one, and then Sing the Song from series two, a brief interlude in the game took place with a performance from a special guest.

In the first series, Barrymore would sing a popular song such as Backstreet Boys' "Backstreet's Back" and P Diddy's "I'll Be Missing You". In the second series, this was changed to an unsigned musical act, whom Barrymore would introduce as "someone he met whilst filming", and would often join in with the performance. From the third series, a well-known pop singer or band would perform a new single in this slot.

=== Megamix ===
The penultimate round of the game, Megamix, had two different formats.

In series one, nine artists were shown on screen and each team picked one, with the team that had the lower amount of money going first. Six songs by that chosen artist would then be shown, with £100 earned for every song identified correctly.

From series two, the two remaining teams each picked a year of their choice and were shown clips of six songs from that year. They would earn £100 per song if they identified it correctly and an extra £100 if they could also name the exact artist correctly. In both instances, after this round, the runner-up team left the game with the money they had won.

=== Musical Families ===
The last team standing faced the final jackpot round, Musical Families. Four well known singers had been formed into a pretend family of a dad, mum, son and daughter (though on some occasions, the "family" would consist of either two sons or two daughters). The contestants stopped a randomiser to select one of the blank pictures, and Barrymore would then begin to read a series of clues related to the singer they had to guess. The pair had 60 seconds to guess correctly all four singers and the clock would stop once they answered correctly.

Each correct answer won £1,000 and identifying all four singers correctly won the jackpot of an additional £10,000 for the first three series; this was increased to £13,000 from series four. Whatever they won in this round was added to the money they had won in earlier rounds, meaning that winning teams would often walk away with prize money in excess of around £15,000–£20,000.

== Famous contestants ==
The show was noticeable for some future music stars appearing as contestants on the show, including Paul Potts, who later won the first series of Britain's Got Talent in 2007; Jodie Prenger, who won I'd Do Anything in 2008; and Jessica Taylor, who went on to become part of the band Liberty X that was formed from the original series of Popstars. Another original Popstars contestant, Danny Foster, made an appearance as a contestant and was the singer on his team.

== Transmissions ==
Series	Episodes	Originally released	
Series	Episodes	First released	Last released
1	10	8 February 1998	3 May 1998
2	10	21 February 1999	16 May 1999
3	12	28 January 2000	14 April 2000
4	12	5 January 2001	23 March 2001
5	5 (Note: 12 episodes had been recorded as part of series 5, but only five episodes were shown before ITV pulled the programme from its schedules.)	10 February 2002	29 March 2002
