= List of Keeping Up Appearances episodes =

Keeping Up Appearances title card.

Keeping Up Appearances is a British sitcom, created by Roy Clarke, and broadcast on BBC1. It stars Patricia Routledge as Hyacinth Bucket (which she insists is pronounced "Bouquet"), a social climbing snob intent on impressing the upper and upper-middle classes and striving for social perfection. The series also features Clive Swift as her long-suffering husband, Richard; Josephine Tewson as Elizabeth Warden, Hyacinth's next-door neighbour; Judy Cornwell and Shirley Stelfox as Hyacinth's sisters Daisy and Rose, respectively; and Geoffrey Hughes as Onslow, Daisy's husband. From the second series, Mary Millar replaced Shirley Stelfox as Rose, and David Griffin joined the cast as Emmet Hawksworth, Elizabeth's brother.

During the course of the programme, 44 episodes of Keeping Up Appearances aired, including four specials over five series, between 29 October 1990 and 25 December 1995.

== Overview ==
Series
Series	Episodes	Originally released	
Series	Episodes	First released	Last released
1	6	29 October 1990	3 December 1990
2	10	1 September 1991	3 November 1991
Special		25 December 1991	
3	7	6 September 1992	18 October 1992
4	7	5 September 1993	17 October 1993
Special		26 December 1993	
Special		25 December 1994	
5	10	3 September 1995	5 November 1995
Special		25 December 1995	

== Episodes ==
=== Series 1 (1990) ===
The first series was broadcast on Mondays at 8:30 pm.

No. overall	No. in series	Title	Directed by	Written by	Original release date
1	1	"Daddy's Accident"	Harold Snoad	Roy Clarke	29 October 1990
Hyacinth learns that her Daddy is in hospital after falling off his bicycle while chasing the milkwoman in the nude. Guest-starring Peter Cellier as Major Wilton-Smythe, Leo Dolan as the postman, Bruce Alexander as the doctor, James Ottaway as Mr Oxley, Paul Toothill as the Meter Man and George Webb as Daddy (uncredited). Note: Also known as "The Name is Bouquet: B-U-C-K-E-T"
2	2	"The New Vicar"	Harold Snoad	Roy Clarke	5 November 1990
Hyacinth's sister Daisy and her husband Onslow drop in while Hyacinth has the vicar and his wife to tea to announce that Daddy has run away with a gypsy. To make matters worse, a lovelorn Rose arrives to talk to the vicar about her own funeral. Note: First appearance of Jeremy Gittins as the vicar and Marion Barron as his wife. Guest-starring Eileen Davies as the gypsy and Jill O'Hare as the passerby. Note: Also known as "Welcoming the Dishy Vicar"
3	3	"Stately Home"	Harold Snoad	Roy Clarke	12 November 1990
Hyacinth drags Richard off to a day at Carldon Hall, their local country stately home, but decides to visit her father first. When she arrives, it turns out that he has "escaped" from Daisy and Onslow's house by sliding down a drainpipe dressed as "Captain Midnight". He has apparently gone to save the woman at the Post Office from a "fate worse than death" at the hands of aliens. Hyacinth and Richard then visit the stately home. Hyacinth insists on hanging around the family staircase hoping to meet nobility. To her dismay, Onslow, Daisy and Rose turn up, forcing them to make a hasty exit. Guest-starring Michael Bilton as His Lordship, Eric Carte as the car park attendant, Liz Gebhardt as the angry woman, Les Clack and Stella Kemball as Stately Home visitors and George Webb as Daddy (uncredited). Note: Also known as "Visiting an Acquaintance's Stately Home"
4	4	"The Charity Shop"	Harold Snoad	Roy Clarke	19 November 1990
Hyacinth does her weekly volunteering shift at the local charity shop with Elizabeth and the formidable, anti-romance-tirading Councillor Mrs Nugent; meanwhile, a woman claiming to be Hyacinth's father's fiancée has moved herself into his bedroom and Hyacinth is called to manage the situation. Councillor Nugent arrives to return some unsuitable underwear donations that Rose had donated to the shop. Note: Also known as "A Fate Worse than Senility" and "Charity Ends at Home" Guest-starring Gretchen Franklin as Daddy's fiancée, Charmian May as Councillor Mrs Nugent, Leo Dolan as the postman, Norman Lovett as Mr Duxberry, Denis Bond as his mate and George Webb as Daddy (uncredited).
5	5	"Daisy's Toyboy"	Harold Snoad	Roy Clarke	26 November 1990
In an attempt to make Onslow jealous, Daisy tries to convince him that she has found herself a 17-year-old "toyboy", but Onslow does not seem to notice. Meanwhile, the Ladies' Circle is expecting a guest speaker at the church hall and Hyacinth decides to take charge of the arrangements. Guest-starring Jonny Lee Miller as the youth, Jeremy Gittins as the vicar, Robert Rawles as the milkman, Jeanne Mockford as Mrs East, Tricia Thorns as Mrs Dobson, Linda James and Pamela Abbott as ladies at church and Ian Burford as the neighbour. Note: Also known as "Our Daisy and Her Toy Boy"
6	6	"The Christening"	Harold Snoad	Roy Clarke	3 December 1990
On Daisy and Onslow's new granddaughter Kylie's christening day, great-aunt Hyacinth is most displeased that the baby's mother, Daisy and Onslow's daughter Stephanie, is not married, but Richard encourages Hyacinth to attend the christening with an open mind. When the mother and child fail to turn up, Hyacinth and Richard go searching for them. Note: Final appearance of Shirley Stelfox as Rose. Bruce and Violet make a cameo first appearance, although played by uncredited actors. Guest-starring Gerald Sim as the vicar, Laura Shavin as Stephanie, Richard Ashton and Rick Friend as the hippies, Jonathan Fryer as Dennis, Bruce Bennett as Reg, Patricia Leach as Mrs Midgeley and George Webb as Daddy (uncredited). Note: Also known as "How to Manage a Family Christening" and "Great-Aunt Hyacinth"

=== Series 2 (1991) ===
The second series was broadcast on Sundays at 7:15 pm. The 1991 Christmas special was broadcast on Wednesday night at 8:50 pm.

No. overall	No. in series	Title	Directed by	Written by	Original release date
7	1	"A Strange Man"	Harold Snoad	Roy Clarke	1 September 1991
Hyacinth is shocked to see a strange man wearing only a towel emerge from Elizabeth's house to get the newly delivered milk, becoming outraged at what she perceives as the "moral degradation" of the neighbourhood. The man turns out to be Elizabeth's brother Emmet, who lost his home in a messy divorce and has moved in with his sister. Once she finds out that he is a musician, Hyacinth sings at him at every opportunity and soon he is completely terrified of her. Meanwhile, Daddy has gone missing again. This is the last episode to have a mono theme on the screen. Note: First appearance of David Griffin as Emmet and Mary Millar in the role of Rose. Alternative title: "Elizabeth's Strange Man" Guest-starring Robert Rawles as the milkman and George Webb as Daddy (uncredited).
8	2	"Driving Mrs Fortescue"	Harold Snoad	Roy Clarke	8 September 1991
Hyacinth and Richard drive the wealthy Mrs Fortescue, a brash and sharp-tongued woman "whose sister married a baronet", into town. Hyacinth's plans to impress her are crushed when Daisy and Rose flag down the Buckets for a lift and they all wind up in a local pub, where Mrs Fortescue has more fun with Daisy and Rose than with Hyacinth. This is the first episode to have a stereo theme on the screen. Guest-starring Jean Anderson as Mrs Fortescue, Leonard Lowe as the pub customer and Michael Burrell as the neighbour.
9	3	"The Candlelight Supper"	Harold Snoad	Roy Clarke	15 September 1991
Hyacinth wants to impress Emmet with her musical talents at an elaborate musical candlelight supper. Her plans backfire when a short-skirted Rose turns up followed by two aggressive men who fight on the doorstep. Guest-starring Dicken Ashworth as Boris, Gregory Cox as Mr Helliwell and Stuart Sherwin as man with dog.
10	4	"Golfing with the Major"	Harold Snoad	Roy Clarke	22 September 1991
The Major invites the Buckets to a golfing weekend at The Chesford Grange Hotel. All is well until Onslow and Daisy turn up unexpectedly to collect Rose, who has spent an amorous weekend with a Mr Smith in Room 210. When Hyacinth realises that her family is there, she fears for her social standing. Adding to her dilemma are the amorous intentions of the Major. Notes: Elizabeth and Emmet do not appear in this episode. This is the only episode that Elizabeth does not appear in.; This is the only episode not to feature the Bucket household in any capacity.; Guest-starring Peter Cellier as Major Wilton-Smythe, Bernard Archard and Dinah Sheridan as the hotel guests, Sally Hughes as the receptionist, Christopher Mitchell and Eamonn Clarke as the porters and Sharon White as the chambermaid.
11	5	"Problems with Relatives"	Harold Snoad	Roy Clarke	29 September 1991
Hyacinth's brother-in-law Bruce is stuck up a tree and Daddy goes to the register office to be married. Liz offers to drive Daddy back to Daisy's, but to avoid them seeing how Daisy and Onslow live, Hyacinth insists they stop off at Violet's. Note: On some DVDs, this episode is titled "The Googley-Eyed Registrar." Guest-starring Brendan O'Hea as the missionary, Simon Merrick as the committee chairman, Robert Bain as the committee member, Helen Christie as the registrar and George Webb as Daddy (uncredited).
12	6	"Onslow's Birthday"	Harold Snoad	Roy Clarke	6 October 1991
Hyacinth is dreading an invite to Onslow's birthday party, but changes her mind when Rose says her wealthy Greek boyfriend will pick up Hyacinth and Richard in one of his "big cars". Because of this, she decides to hold "pre-lunch cocktails" at her home to impress the neighbours as she departs in the luxury vehicle. Her hopes disintegrate when a hearse arrives. Guest-starring Peter Cellier as Major Wilton-Smythe, Jeremy Gittins as the vicar, Marion Barron as the vicar's wife, Anthony Dawes as the jeweller, Ivan Santos as Mr Marinopolous, Simon Merrick as the committee chairman and Robert Bain as the committee member. Note: Also known as "Cocktails with a Greek Shipping Millionaire" and "Happy Birthday, Onslow!"
13	7	"Singing for Emmet"	Harold Snoad	Roy Clarke	13 October 1991
Richard is offered early retirement and ponders a future spending all day every day with Hyacinth. Emmet is enraged when Hyacinth ends up rehearsing a performance for the old people at the church hall with him, and a tranquilised Rose arrives at the scene wanting to become a nun. Guest-starring Jeremy Gittins as the vicar, Marion Barron as the vicar's wife and Nigel Williams as Mr Penworthy. Note: Also known as "The Unfortunate Prospect of Early Retirement."
14	8	"The Toy Store"	Harold Snoad	Roy Clarke	20 October 1991
Daddy has ended up at the toy store dressed as an astronaut and is "improving" a few toys with the help of a screwdriver, to a total cost of £235. Hyacinth's social status is nearly ruined when she encounters councillor Mrs Nugent in town while attempting to retrieve Daddy. Guest-starring Charmian May as Councillor Mrs Nugent, John Pennington as the store official, David Warwick as his assistant, Juliet Douglas as the salesgirl, John Owens as the insurance salesman, Robert Bain as Frank and George Webb as Daddy (uncredited). Note: Also known as "Playthings for Daddy"
15	9	"The Three-Piece Suite"	Harold Snoad	Roy Clarke	27 October 1991
Hyacinth excitedly anticipates the arrival of her new three-piece suite ("an exact replica of the one at Sandringham House!"), and plans to use the delivery to make Mrs Barker-Finch jealous. She gives giving Daisy and Onslow her old suite, provided that they pick it up themselves. These two events will likely collide at some point, creating another social disaster. Guest-starring Nick Burnell as the driver and David Keller as his mate. Note: Also known as "The Important Delivery" and "The V.I.P. Delivery"
16	10	"A Picnic for Daddy"	Harold Snoad	Roy Clarke	3 November 1991
Hyacinth arranges a special picnic for Daddy, but things go awry when he drives away in Richard's car, resulting in a car chase between him and the rest of the family. Onslow's car breaks down, so the vicar and his wife pick up Hyacinth and her family. Guest-starring Jeremy Gittins as the vicar, Marion Barron as the vicar's wife and George Webb as Daddy (uncredited). Note: Also known as "Hyacinth's Picnic Panic"

=== Christmas special (1991) ===
No.	Title	Directed by	Written by	Original release date
17	"The Father Christmas Suit"	Harold Snoad	Roy Clarke	25 December 1991
Hyacinth hires a Father Christmas outfit for Richard to wear when distributing gifts to the old people at the church hall. Against his will, Richard puts it on, but after getting drunk with Emmet, Elizabeth must don the outfit and pretend to be him, but as usual, disaster strikes. Guest-starring Jeremy Gittins as the vicar, Tony Kemp as Mr Sudbury, Mark Brackenbury as Mr Thorgunby, Annet Peters as Mrs Thorgunby, Robert Packham as the postman and George Webb as Daddy (uncredited). Note: Also known as "A Very Merry Hyacinth"

=== Series 3 (1992) ===
The third series was broadcast on Sundays at 7:15 pm.

No. overall	No. in series	Title	Directed by	Written by	Original release date
18	1	"Early Retirement"	Harold Snoad	Roy Clarke	6 September 1992
Turning up for his final day at work, Richard finally faces the prospect of early retirement; meanwhile, Hyacinth telephones the Prime Minister's office asking if Richard is included on the honours list. Later, the house-proud Hyacinth prepares for a guest, but Rose's latest boyfriend's dog parks itself on her driveway. Guest-starring Ivor Danvers as Richard's boss, Robert Rawles as the milkman and Jon Glover as Roger. Note: Also known as "The Honourable Richard B-u-c-k-e-t"
19	2	"Iron Age Remains"	Harold Snoad	Roy Clarke	13 September 1992
Now that Richard is retired, Hyacinth decides to expand their knowledge of local history. The pair head off into the country in search of Iron Age remains. Meanwhile, a freshly dumped Rose locks herself in her room and calls for the vicar. Guest-starring David Janson as the postman and Jeremy Gittins as the vicar. Note: Also known as "Digging Up The Past"
20	3	"Violet's Country Cottage"	Harold Snoad	Roy Clarke	20 September 1992
Hyacinth borrows Violet and Bruce's luxury cottage for the weekend and prepares a barbecue. In an attempt to impress Bunty, the lady from the manor house, Hyacinth drinks a bit too much and gets carried away with the summer spirit while Richard searches for Bunty's dog and encounters her husband, Dorian. Meanwhile, Daddy has a new Polish girlfriend, "Mrs Thing". Guest-starring Marcia Warren as Bunty, Royce Mills as Dorian, Ian Burford as the neighbour and George Webb as Daddy (uncredited). Note: Also known as "The Country Retreat" - not to be confused with the Series 4 episode of the same title.
21	4	"How to Go on Holiday Without Really Trying"	Harold Snoad	Roy Clarke	27 September 1992
Envious over a neighbour's luxury holiday, Hyacinth decides to impress the neighbours by pretending to go on an expensive vacation herself. Meanwhile, Onslow decides to take Richard away to help him discover "the joys of irresponsibility." Hyacinth has a humbling experience volunteering for church cleaning. Note: Also known as "Travel Brochure" Guest-starring Jeremy Gittins as the vicar, Marion Barron as the vicar's wife and Karen Chatwin as the waitress.
22	5	"Richard's New Hobby"	Harold Snoad	Roy Clarke	4 October 1992
Hyacinth gets Richard started filming with the video camera he was awarded for his retirement and boasts to the neighbours that he is a film maker, which impresses councillor Mrs Nugent, who is coming for afternoon tea. Then Onslow's car breaks down outside her house and Richard is brought home in a police car. Guest-starring Charmian May as Councillor Mrs Nugent and Matthew Long and Jonathan Stratt as the policemen. Note: Also known as "Richard in the Frame"
23	6	"The Art Exhibition"	Harold Snoad	Roy Clarke	11 October 1992
Hyacinth's preparations to visit an art exhibition are thrown off course when Daddy goes off to join the Foreign Legion. Rose and her latest boyfriend help hunt for him, not realising that their suggestive conversation is being broadcast throughout the neighbourhood. When Hyacinth finally finds Daddy, he is holding a sign that reads "If you love me let me know" outside the home of his latest romantic interest. Guest-starring Jeremy Gittins as the vicar, Nicholas Bennett as Mr Finchley, Jennifer Daniel as Mrs Lennox and George Webb as Daddy (uncredited). Note: Also known as "But Is It Art?"
24	7	"What to Wear When Yachting"	Harold Snoad	Roy Clarke	18 October 1992
Hyacinth and Richard head off on a yachting weekend, only to discover that the boat is a small, dilapidated vessel. Their attempts to move it downstream, away from a more impressive yacht, end in disaster. Guest-starring Tony Aitken as the TV repairman, Nicholas Boyce as the youth and Ian Collier as the sales assistant.

=== Series 4 (1993–94) ===
The fourth series and the 1993 Christmas special (Boxing Day) was broadcast on Sundays at 7:00 pm. The 1994 Christmas special was broadcast on Sunday evening at 5:25 pm.

No. overall	No. in series	Title	Directed by	Written by	Original release date
25	1	"A Job for Richard"	Harold Snoad	Roy Clarke	5 September 1993
Hyacinth's attempts to keep Richard's retirement interesting continue with her finding him a potential executive job in Frosticle's frozen foods; to impress the manager of the company she has contrived a plot involving Onslow and golf. Meanwhile, Daddy has become a naturist. Note: Also known as "No Job Too Big" and "Richard's Frosty Reception" Alternative title: "Hyacinth Tees Off" Guest-starring David Janson as the postman, Frederick Jaeger as Mr Millburn, Joe Dunlop as his companion and Michael L. Blair as the pillion rider.
26	2	"Country Retreat"	Harold Snoad	Roy Clarke	12 September 1993
The Buckets search for "a little place in the country", but what Hyacinth really wants is something large and impressive. During their search an eccentric farmer takes a liking to her, but his wife is not so friendly. While checking out property Richard gets stuck in an attic and Hyacinth is chased by some sheep. Guest-starring Denis Bond as the estate agent, Barrie Gosney as the yokel and Liz Daniels as his wife.
27	3	"A Celebrity for the Barbecue"	Harold Snoad	Roy Clarke	19 September 1993
For her summer entertaining, Hyacinth has decided to host an elaborate indoors/outdoors luxury barbecue with finger buffet, and she is determined to get a local celebrity as a guest to one-up the Barker-Finches. Richard reveals to Hyacinth that he sees C.P. Benedict, the manager of the local garden centre, walking his dog in the park; upon hearing this, Hyacinth is ecstatic and realises that she has seen Benedict on the television several times, so tries to invite him to her barbecue. Meanwhile, Daisy is convinced that Onslow is seeing another woman, so Rose gives Daisy a makeover to make her look more attractive for Onslow. Guest-starring Clovissa Newcombe as the cashier and Paul Williamson as C.P. Benedict.
28	4	"The Commodore"	Harold Snoad	Roy Clarke	26 September 1993
Hyacinth switches on her sailing persona when volunteering to collect a guest speaker Commodore from a railway station. Unfortunately, Richard's car gets clamped and they cannot find the man they are to escort. When Hyacinth does finally meet the Commodore, she is unprepared for his attempts at seduction. Guest-starring Nigel Davenport as the commodore, Jeremy Gittins as the vicar, Donald T. Allen as the stationmaster, Geraldine Newman as the chairlady, Linda James and Liz Edmiston as committee members, Ann Davies as the lady at the luncheon, Irene Sharp as the lady at the station, Gordon Peters as the ticket clerk, Leonard Lowe as a passenger and John Barrard as the homeowner.
29	5	"Looking at Properties"	Harold Snoad	Roy Clarke	3 October 1993
A policeman arrives to inform Hyacinth that her senile Daddy has been kept at the police station for patrolling the town hall with a bayonet. She sends Richard (heavily disguised) to retrieve him while she goes to look at country properties with Elizabeth, but Richard is terrified that she will get carried away and buy something they cannot afford. Note: This and the following episode are sequels to #26. Guest-starring John Phythian as the Constable, Terrence Hardiman as Eric, Jennifer Clulow as the estate agent, John Arnatt as Sir Edward, Eric Carte as Sergeant Watkins, Stuart Fell as the driver and the first credited appearance of George Webb as Daddy.
30	6	"Please Mind Your Head"	Harold Snoad	Roy Clarke	10 October 1993
Hyacinth and Richard spend time in their very small apartment in the countryside. Hyacinth invites Elizabeth and Emmet for afternoon cucumber sandwiches, but bump into them on their way there and Hyacinth tries to give the impression that she can ride a horse. Later Emmet's head gets stuck in the ceiling after Elizabeth spills her ice-cold lemonade on him, as Hyacinth's other invited guests arrive. Note: Also known as "Emmet Hits The Roof" Guest-starring David Janson as the postman, Robert Rawles as the milkman, Helen Dorward as the visitor and George Webb as Daddy (uncredited). No further references to the Buckets' summer home appear in the series.
31	7	"Let There Be Light"	Harold Snoad	Roy Clarke	17 October 1993
Hyacinth has volunteered Richard to fix the church hall electrics in time for the bring and buy sale, despite his lack of electrical capabilities. Meanwhile, Onslow, Daisy and Rose turn up with Daddy, who believes he is back in the war and he takes command when Richard's repair efforts end in disaster. Guest-starring David Janson as the postman, Jeremy Gittins as the vicar, Marion Barron as the vicar's wife, Sue Lloyd as Mrs Drummond, Pamela Abbott as the driver and George Webb as Daddy.

=== Christmas special (1993) ===
No.	Title	Directed by	Written by	Original release date
32	"Sea Fever"	Harold Snoad	Roy Clarke	26 December 1993
Hyacinth and Richard prepare for their luxury stay on the QE2. Traffic problems, a muddy field and too much luggage result in a disastrous start to the holiday: they are too late to board the ship at Southampton and it leaves without them. They fly to Denmark to meet the ship at Copenhagen. Once on board, Hyacinth spots Daisy and Onslow and mistakenly assumes they are stowaways. Note: This is the only episode that takes place in another country, as one scene takes place in Copenhagen, Denmark, though the scene was actually filmed in Oslo, Norway. Guest-starring Lord Lichfield as himself, Lyndsay Frost as himself, Alice Macdonald as the check-in girl, Mark Brignal as the port official, Bernard Holley as the restaurant manager, David Janson as the postman, Barry Bethell as the holidaymaker, The Band of the Welsh Fusiliers as themselves, The Mark Joyce Showband as themselves and Michael Cochrane as the ship officer. The version on BBC iPlayer omits an entire scene with Barry Bethell owing to Bethell's conviction in 2009 for child sex offences.

=== Christmas special (1994) ===
No.	Title	Directed by	Written by	Original release date
33	"Angel Gabriel Blue"	Harold Snoad	Roy Clarke	25 December 1994
Hyacinth searches for her dream kitchen worktop, while Richard has developed athlete's foot, a "lower-class ailment" Hyacinth does not approve of. As a result, she insists it is gout, a disease supposedly caused by "an excess of good living". Meanwhile, Daddy has gone missing again and a stranger has taken over his bed. Guest-starring Trevor Bannister as the salesman, Jeremy Gittins as the vicar, George Webb as Daddy, Preston Lockwood as Mr Mawsby and Andrew Bicknell and Caroline Strong as the customers.

=== Series 5 (1995) ===
The fifth series was broadcast on Sundays at 8:30 pm. The 1995 Christmas special was broadcast on Monday night at 8:00 pm.

No. overall	No. in series	Title	Directed by	Written by	Original release date
34	1	"The Senior Citizens' Outing"	Harold Snoad	Roy Clarke	3 September 1995
Hyacinth volunteers to look after some senior citizens on a church outing to the seaside. She gets more than she bargained for when the mischievous vicar assigns her the amorous Mr Farrini and travel-sick Mrs Lomax, as well as the long-suffering Elizabeth and Richard, who is driving the minibus. Guest-starring Angus Lennie as Mr Farrini, Derek Waring as Mr Cooper-Bassett, Rita Davies as Mrs Lomax, Eric Carte as the Sergeant, John Darrell as the Inspector, Jeremy Gittins as the vicar, Marion Barron as the vicar's wife and Sheila Rennie as the lady helper. Note: Also known as "Seaside Fun".
35	2	"The Mayor's Fancy Dress Ball"	Harold Snoad	Roy Clarke	10 September 1995
Hyacinth prepares for the mayor's fancy dress ball and is also on a mission to impress the new neighbours, a few streets away, but she is greatly displeased with the costumes Richard hires for them. After deciding on a better idea, Hyacinth finds that most of the female guests have a costume very similar to hers. Meanwhile, Rose is engaged to a Polish man whose name she cannot pronounce. Guest-starring David Janson as the postman, Kyle Wicks as the boy, Ivor Danvers as the Town Hall official and Jean Harvey as Mrs Donaghue.
36	3	"Hyacinth Is Alarmed"	Harold Snoad	Roy Clarke	17 September 1995
Richard is terrified to wake up to Hyacinth smiling at him and even more terrified when he realises he has forgotten their wedding anniversary. He saves the day when he decides to have an alarm system installed, claiming it is Hyacinth's "surprise" anniversary present, and Hyacinth verbally harasses the representative and his employees as she wants an alarm with a "dusty pink" light and the Queen Elizabeth II horn as a siren. Guest-starring Ian Lavender as the security representative, Graham Root and Ben de Winter as the engineers, Jeremy Gittins as the vicar, David Janson as the postman, Margaret Towner as the elderly lady and George Webb as Daddy.
37	4	"A Riverside Picnic"	Harold Snoad	Roy Clarke	24 September 1995
Hyacinth organises a "waterside supper with riparian entertainment", much to the despair of those she invites, which consists of Elizabeth, Emmet, the vicar and his wife. Despite Emmet's and the vicar's best efforts they find getting out of Hyacinth's function impossible. As usual her plans of perfection are shattered, this time because a dredger dumps dirt in her chosen location. Note: First major appearance of Violet. Guest-starring Jeremy Gittins as the vicar, Marion Barron as the vicar's wife, Anna Dawson as Violet, David Janson as the postman, Steve Morley as the lock keeper and George Webb as Daddy (uncredited).
38	5	"Skis"	Harold Snoad	Roy Clarke	1 October 1995
Hyacinth has bought Richard skis for his birthday because they "will look good on the car". Needing Violet and Bruce's roof rack, the Buckets head off to Violet's luxury home, picking up two neighbours along the way and arriving to find Violet and Bruce arguing. Guest-starring Jeremy Gittins as the vicar, Marion Barron as the vicar's wife, Anna Dawson as Violet, John Evitts as Bruce and Lois Penson and Clare Kelly as the Misses Pilsworth.
39	6	"Country Estate Sale"	Harold Snoad	Roy Clarke	8 October 1995
Richard tries to save his wallet from losing some weight when he and Hyacinth attend an estate auction in the country, and Liz and Emmet dodge Hyacinth in the manor halls. Meanwhile, a Mrs Braddock has commandeered Onslow's car and is impersonating his dog, which has gone missing. In the end Hyacinth comes away with several bottles of "the Dowager Lady Ursula's homemade gooseberry wine" and gets drunk. Guest-starring Bruce Montague as His Lordship, David Simeon as the auctioneer, David Ashford as his assistant, Jessica James as Mrs Braddock and Colin Stepney as His Lordship's servant.
40	7	"The Boy Friend"	Harold Snoad	Roy Clarke	15 October 1995
Hyacinth sings to her heart's content when discovering Emmet's latest musical The Boy Friend is in production. Meanwhile, Daddy is once again thinking that he is back in the war and guarding Onslow's house with a bayonet, while Daisy hopes to have Onslow to herself for the day. Guest-starring Jeremy Gittins as the vicar and George Webb as Daddy (uncredited).
41	8	"A Barbecue at Violet's"	Harold Snoad	Roy Clarke	22 October 1995
When Bruce and Violet's constant arguing threatens Hyacinth's luxury barbecue, she resorts to desperate musical measures to keep her family scandals from public exposure. Things get worse when Hyacinth accidentally throws Daddy's bucket of horse manure over the food when the barbecue catches fire. Guest-starring Jeremy Gittins as the vicar, Marion Barron as the vicar's wife, Jack Smethurst as the man in the phone box, Anna Dawson as Violet, John Evitts as Bruce, Jenny Morton, Alexandra Howard and Anna Bolt as the dancers and George Webb as Daddy (uncredited).
42	9	"The Rolls-Royce"	Harold Snoad	Roy Clarke	29 October 1995
Hyacinth urges Richard to "borrow" a Rolls-Royce from a dealership to impress one of her society rivals and a test drive with that prestigious vehicle leads them to a country hotel, where Hyacinth gets attention for the wrong reasons. Meanwhile, Daddy thinks he is hunting elephants in Africa with Onslow. Note: Emmet does not appear in this episode. Alternative title: "A Crafts-Woman Scorned" Guest-starring Timothy Carlton as the car salesman, John Pennington as the sergeant and George Webb as Daddy (uncredited).
43	10	"The Hostess"	Harold Snoad	Roy Clarke	5 November 1995
An excited Hyacinth has put an advert in the local newspaper to teach people social etiquette, but the clientele proves far different from what she expected. It turns out they wanted a striptease dancer as a result of misreading her advert. Before leaving, she sends Richard in to retrieve Daddy. Guest-starring Robert Rawles as the milkman, John Waterhouse as his assistant and Ian Burford as the neighbour.

=== Christmas special (1995) ===
No.	Title	Directed by	Written by	Original release date
44	"The Pageant"	Harold Snoad	Roy Clarke	25 December 1995
Final episode. Hyacinth and Richard arrive at the church hall as Hyacinth organises a pageant based on the English Civil War, with herself as Queen Henrietta Maria and Richard as Charles I. However, all of the volunteers supposedly taking part are unable to make it. In a last-minute attempt to get the show off the ground, Hyacinth invites Onslow, Daisy, Rose, Bruce and Violet to participate. However, during rehearsals, Hyacinth is injured in a stage accident after Liz accidentally releases the wrong rope. Meanwhile, Daddy is dancing the tango with another man. Note: This final episode of the series was watched by 16.73 million viewers. Guest-starring Una Stubbs as Mrs Moody, Tony Stuart as Mr Crabtree, John Evitts as Bruce, Anna Dawson as Violet, Miranda Kingsley as the shop assistant, George Webb as Daddy, Jeremy Gittins as the vicar and Marion Barron as the vicar's wife.

== Other media ==
=== Children in Need ===
A short special was produced for Children in Need and broadcast on 24 November 1995.

=== Compilations ===
Two compilation specials were produced; the first, "The Memoirs of Hyacinth Bucket", was broadcast on 20 March 1997 and sees Daisy discovers a manuscript of Hyacinth's memoirs amongst some things she loaned her, prompting Daisy and Onslow to look back at some of the funniest moments from the show. The second, "Life Lessons from Onslow", was released exclusively on DVD in the United States via BBC Video on 9 September 2008. It sees Onslow present lessons for life when hosting an Open University programme, by showing various moments from the Keeping Up Appearances show.

=== Young Hyacinth ===
A prequel episode was broadcast on BBC One on 2 September 2016 which is set in the early 1950s and a young Hyacinth Walton (Kerry Howard) is seen desperately trying to force her family to climb the ever-expanding social ladder. It was watched by 4.39 million viewers.

== Notes ==
The Warner Home Video 10 disc Collector's Edition DVD box set mislabels series 5 episodes 6-10 as series 6 episodes in the United States.

The Series Three and Four Boxset did not include the 1993 and 1994 Christmas specials. These were released with the 2006 boxset. A complete collection was released on 8 October 2007.
