= Hoi polloi =

Expression from Greek that means "the many"

- Origin: Greek
- Meaning: "the many"

The English expression "(the) hoi polloi" (/ˌhɔɪ pəˈlɔɪ/) was borrowed from Ancient Greek (οἱ πολλοί), where it means "the many" or, in the strictest sense, "the people". In English, it has been given a negative connotation to signify the common people. Synonyms for hoi polloi include "the plebs" (plebeians), "the rabble", "the masses", "the great unwashed", "the riffraff", and "the proles" (proletarians).

There is also widespread spoken use of the term in the opposite sense to refer denigratingly to elites that is common among middle-class and lower-income people in several English-speaking countries and regions, including at least Australia, North America, and Scotland since at least the 1950s. However, this use is often considered incorrect.

The phrase probably became known to English scholars through "Pericles' Funeral Oration", as mentioned in Thucydides' History of the Peloponnesian War. Pericles uses it in a positive way when praising the Athenian democracy, contrasting it with hoi oligoi, "the few" (Greek: οἱ ὀλίγοι; see also oligarchy).

Its current English usage originated in the early 19th century, a time when it was generally accepted that one must be familiar with Greek and Latin to be considered well educated. The phrase was originally written in Greek letters. Knowledge of these languages served to set apart the speaker from hoi polloi in question, who were not similarly educated.

== Pronunciation ==
The term is pronounced very differently in English, Ancient Greek, and Modern Greek:

- Educated English speakers pronounce it /ˌhɔɪ pəˈlɔɪ/, but use in the opposite sense of "elites"; it usually has initial stress on "polloi".
- Ancient Greek had phonemic consonant length, or gemination. Speakers would have pronounced it [hoi polloi˨˦], with the double-λ being geminated.
- Modern Greek speakers pronounce it [i poˈli] since, in Modern Greek, there is no voiceless glottal /h/ phoneme and οι is pronounced [i] (all Ancient Greek diphthongs are now pronounced as monophthongs). Greek Cypriots still pronounce the double-λ ([i polˈli]).

== Usage ==
Some linguists argue that, given that hoi is a definite article, the phrase "the hoi polloi" is redundant, akin to saying "the the masses". Others argue that this is inconsistent with other English loanwords. The word "alcohol", for instance, derives from the Arabic al-kuhl, al being an article, yet "the alcohol" is universally accepted as grammatically proper.

== Appearances in the nineteenth century ==
There have been numerous uses of the term in English literature. James Fenimore Cooper, author of The Last of the Mohicans, is often credited with making the first recorded usage of the term in English. The first recorded use by Cooper occurs in his 1837 work Gleanings in Europe where he writes "After which the oi polloi are enrolled as they can find interest."

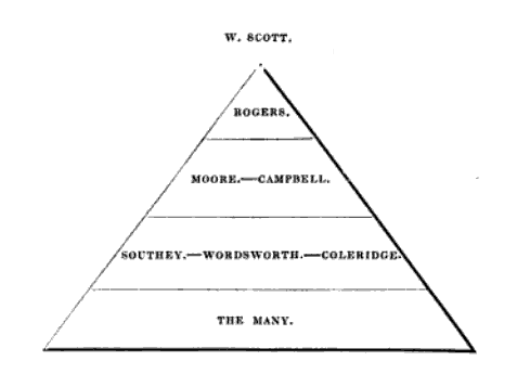
Diagram of Lord Byron's view of the hoi polloi, as arranged in his journals, ranked as "the many" beneath a handful of his personal contacts

Lord Byron had, in fact, previously used the term in his letters and journal. In one journal entry, dated 24 November 1813, Byron writes:

I have not answered W. Scott's last letter,—but I will. I regret to hear from others, that he has lately been unfortunate in pecuniary involvements. He is undoubtedly the Monarch of Parnassus, and the most English of bards. I should place Rogers next in the living list (I value him more as the last of the best school) —Moore and Campbell both third—Southey and Wordsworth and Coleridge—the rest, οι πολλοί [hoi polloi in Greek].

Byron also wrote an 1821 entry in his journal, "... one or two others, with myself, put on masks, and went on the stage with the 'oi polloi."

In Confessions of an English Opium-Eater, Thomas De Quincey uses the term during a passage discussing which of the English classes is most proud, noting "... the children of bishops carry about with them an austere and repulsive air, indicative of claims not generally acknowledged, a sort of noli me tangere manner, nervously apprehensive of too familiar approach, and shrinking with the sensitiveness of a gouty man from all contact with the οι πολλοι."

While Charles Darwin was at the University of Cambridge from 1828 to 1831, undergraduates used the term "hoi polloi" or "Poll" for those reading for an ordinary degree, the "pass degree". At that time, only capable mathematicians would take the Tripos or honours degree. In his autobiography written in the 1870s, Darwin recalled that "By answering well the examination questions in Paley, by doing Euclid well, and by not failing miserably in Classics, I gained a good place among the οἱ πολλοί, or crowd of men who do not go in for honours."

W. S. Gilbert used the term in 1882 when he wrote the libretto of the comic opera Iolanthe. In Act I, the following exchange occurs between a group of disgruntled fairies who are arranging to elevate a lowly shepherd to the peerage, and members of the House of Lords who will not hear of such a thing:

PEERS: Our lordly style
You shall not quench
With base canaille!

FAIRIES: (That word is French.)

PEERS: Distinction ebbs
Before a herd
Of vulgar plebs!

FAIRIES: (A Latin word.)

PEERS: 'Twould fill with joy,
And madness stark
The hoi polloi!

FAIRIES: (A Greek remark.)

Gilbert's parallel use of canaille, plebs (plebeians), and hoi polloi makes it clear that the term is derogatory of the lower classes. In many versions of the vocal score, it is written as "οἱ πολλοί", likely confusing generations of amateur choristers who couldn't read Greek.

John Dryden used the phrase in his Essay of Dramatick Poesie, published in 1668. Dryden spells the phrase with Greek letters, but the rest of the sentence is in English (and he does precede it with "the").

== Appearances in the twentieth century ==
The term has appeared in several films and radio programs. For example, one of the earliest short films from the Three Stooges, Hoi Polloi (1935), opens in an exclusive restaurant where two wealthy gentlemen are arguing whether heredity or environment is more important in shaping character. They make a bet and pick on nearby trashmen (the Stooges) to prove their theory. At the conclusion of three months in training, the Stooges attend a dinner party, where they thoroughly embarrass the professors.

The University of Dayton's Don Morlan says, "The theme in these shorts of the Stooges against the rich is bringing the rich down to their level and shaking their heads." A typical Stooges joke from the film is when someone addresses them "Gentlemen...!" –whereupon they look over their shoulders to see whom is being addressed. The Stooges turn the table on their hosts by calling them "hoi polloi" at the end of the short.

The term continues to be used in contemporary writing. In his 1983 introduction to Robert Anton Wilson's Prometheus Rising, Israel Regardie writes, "Once I was even so presumptuous as to warn (Wilson) in a letter that his humor was much too good to waste on hoi polloi who generally speaking would not understand it and might even resent it."

The term "hoi polloi" was used in a dramatic scene in the film Dead Poets Society (1989). Professor Keating speaks negatively about the use of the article "the" in front of the phrase.

The term was also used in the comedy film Caddyshack (1980). In a rare moment of cleverness, Spaulding Smails greets Danny Noonan as he arrives for the christening of The Flying Wasp, the boat belonging to Judge Elihu Smails (Spaulding's grandfather), with "Ahoy, polloi! Where did you come from, a scotch ad?" This is particularly ironic, because Danny has just finished mowing the Judge's lawn, and arrives overdressed, wearing a sailboat captain's outfit (as the girl seated next to him points out, Danny "looks like Dick Cavett").

In the song "Risingson" on Massive Attack's Mezzanine album, the singer apparently appeals to his company to leave the club they're in, deriding the common persons' infatuation with them, and implying that he's about to slide into antisocial behaviour:

Toy-like people make me boy-like (...)
And everything you got, hoi polloi like
Now you're lost and you're lethal
And now's about the time you gotta leave all

These good people...dream on.

The term was used in a first-series episode ("The New Vicar", aired 5 November 1990) of the British sitcom Keeping Up Appearances. The main character, Hyacinth Bucket, gets into a telephone argument with a bakery employee. When the employee abruptly hangs up in frustration, Hyacinth disparagingly refers to him as "hoi polloi". This is in keeping with her character; she looks down upon those she considers to be of lesser social standing, including working-class people.

"Hoi polloi" was used in Larry Marder's Tales of the Beanworld to name the unusual group of creatures that lived beneath the Beanworld.

The American pop music group The Lovin' Spoonful uses the term in the lyrics of their song "Jug Band Music":

...we staggered into land
With all the waders eatin' sandwiches
And tried to mooch a towel from the hoi polloi...

== Appearances in the twenty-first century ==
The August 14, 2001, episode of CNN's Larry King Live program included a discussion about whether the sport of polo was an appropriate part of the image of the British royal family. Joining King on the program were Robert Lacey and Kitty Kelley. Their discussions focused on Prince Charles (now Charles III) and his son Prince William:

Lacey said, "There is another risk that I see in polo. Polo is a very nouveau riche, I think, rather vulgar game. I can say that having played it myself, and I don't think it does Prince Charles's image, or, I dare say, this is probably arrogant of me, his spirit any good. I don't think it is a good thing for him to be involved in. I also, I'm afraid, don't think [polo] is a good thing for [Charles] to be encouraging his sons to get involved in. It is a very "playboy" set. I think the whole polo syndrome is something that the royal family would do very well to get uninvolved with as soon as possible.

King turned the question to Kelley, saying, "Kitty, it is kind of hoi polloi, although it is an incredible sport in which, I have been told, that the horse is 80 percent of the game, the rider 20 percent. But it is a great sport to watch. But it is hoi polloi isn't it?"

To which Kelley replied, "Yes, I do agree with Robert. The time is come and gone for the royals to be involved with polo. I mean it is – it just increases that dissipated aristo-image that they have, and it is too bad to encourage someone like Prince William to get involved."

The term appears in the 2003 Broadway musical Wicked, where it is used by the characters Elphaba and Glinda to refer to the many inhabitants of the Emerald City: "... I wanna be in this hoi polloi ..."

Jack Cafferty, a CNN anchorman, was caught misusing the term. On 9 December 2004, he retracted his statement, saying "And hoi-polloi refers to common people, not those rich morons that are evicting those two red-tail hawks (ph) from that fifth Avenue co-op. I misused the word hoi-polloi. And for that I humbly apologize."

New media and new inventions have also been described as being by or for the hoi polloi. Bob Garfield, co-host of NPR's On the Media program, 8 November 2005, used the phrase in reference to changing practices in the media, especially Wikipedia, "The people in the encyclopedia business, I understand, tend to sniff at the wiki process as being the product of the mere hoi polloi."

In "Sunk Costs" (Season 3, episode 3) of Better Call Saul, Jimmy has been arrested and the DDA (Oakley) teases him "getting fingerprinted with the hoi polloi".

The first episode of the Frasier 2023 reboot shows Kelsey Grammer sharing a beer with some peers while saying, "What is it about the city of Boston that leads me to forego the more sophisticated temptation of the fermented grape? Sitting here with a cold brew in my hand, I feel amalgamated with the hoi polloi".

== See also ==
- Polyarchy
- Criticism of democracy – Critiques of democratic political systems
- Dominant ideology – Concept in Marxist philosophy
- Doxa – Greek word meaning common belief or popular opinion
- NPC (meme) – Insult implying a lack of critical thinking
- Tragedy of the commons – Overuse of a shared resource
- Tyranny of the majority – Inherent oppressive potential of simple majority rule
- Vox populi – Latin phrase meaning "voice of the people"
- Baixing – Chinese term that refers to "commoners"
