= Mrs. Bucket =

Mrs. Bucket may refer to the following fictional characters:

- The mother of Charlie Bucket from Charlie and the Chocolate Factory
- Hyacinth Bucket, in the BBC sitcom Keeping Up Appearances
