= Geoffrey Hughes (actor) =

English actor (1944–2012)

Geoffrey Hughes DL
- Hughes as he appeared in Heartbeat
- Born: Geoffrey William Hughes; 2 February 1944; Kirkdale, Liverpool, England
- Died: 27 July 2012 (aged 68); Isle of Wight, England
- Occupation: Actor
- Years active: 1964–2010
- Notable work: Coronation Street; Keeping Up Appearances; The Royle Family; Heartbeat
- Spouse: Susan Mundell (m. 1975)

Geoffrey William Hughes DL (2 February 1944 – 27 July 2012) was an English actor. Hughes provided the voice of Paul McCartney in the animated film Yellow Submarine (1968), and rose to fame for portraying bin man Eddie Yeats in the long-running British soap opera Coronation Street from 1974 to 1983, making a return to the show in 1987. He is well known for playing loveable slob Onslow in the British sitcom Keeping Up Appearances (1990–1995) and "Twiggy" in the sitcom The Royle Family, playing the part from 1998 to 2008.

From 2001 to 2005 he played conman and rogue businessman Vernon Scripps in the ITV police drama Heartbeat, taking over as the show's main rogue from Bill Maynard's Claude Greengrass, and returning to the programme briefly in 2007.

Hughes was diagnosed with prostate cancer in the 1990s and in 2010 he suffered a relapse which led him to retire from acting. He died from the illness in 2012 at age 68.

== Life and career ==
Hughes was born at 21 Leven Street in Kirkdale, Liverpool to Ada (née Tulloch) and William Arthur Hughes. He had one younger brother, Gordon. He was brought up in Norris Green, where he attended Ranworth Square Primary School and Abbotsford Secondary Modern School. He started his acting career in repertory at the Victoria Theatre in Stoke-on-Trent and soon made his West End debut in the Lionel Bart and Alun Owen musical Maggie May. His other West End productions included the stage version of The Wonderful Wizard of Oz, Say Goodnight to Grandma, The Secret Life of Cartoons and several series of Run For Your Wife. He later played Pistol in an open-air production of Henry V at Barnwell Manor. He also toured extensively in Britain and abroad.

Hughes' film credits included Smashing Time (1967), The Bofors Gun (1968), Till Death Us Do Part (1969), The Virgin Soldiers (1969), The Man Who Had Power Over Women (1970), Revenge (1971), Carry On at Your Convenience (1971), Adolf Hitler: My Part in His Downfall (1973), Tiffany Jones (1973), Confessions of a Driving Instructor (1976), Nijinsky (1980), and Flick (2008). He was also the voice of Paul McCartney in the Beatles' 1968 cartoon film Yellow Submarine.

In 1974, Hughes was cast as binman Eddie Yeats in the long-running soap opera Coronation Street. Over the next nine years he became, with Stan Ogden (as played by Bernard Youens), a foil for Stan's long-suffering wife Hilda (Jean Alexander). He left the series in 1983, but made a brief return appearance in 1987 as part of Hilda's departure from the series.

Among his many other appearances on television are: An Arrow for Little Audrey; The Saint; Shadows of Fear; Z-Cars; Randall and Hopkirk (Deceased); Flying Lady; Making Out; Coasting; Doctor Who; Spender; and Boon. He played Trinculo in a version of The Tempest for the BBC and Squire Clodpoll in Good Friday 1663, one of Channel Four's new avant-garde operas. His comedy appearances on TV include The Likely Lads, Please Sir!, Dad's Army, Curry and Chips, No, Honestly, and The Upper Hand.

Hughes played the character of Onslow in the BBC sitcom Keeping Up Appearances (1990–1995), appearing in all 44 episodes over five series. In 1997 he and Judy Cornwell reprised their roles as Onslow and Daisy in a special compilation programme called The Memoirs of Hyacinth Bucket which was subsequently released on VHS. Hughes reprised his role as Onslow one final time in 2008, for the video (DVD) release of a further compilation programme, Keeping Up Appearances: Life Lessons from Onslow.

He also had a recurring role as Twiggy in The Royle Family from 1998 until 2008.

On 14 February 2001, ITV broadcast episode 12 of series 41 of the British biographical television series This Is Your Life (British TV series) featuring Hughes. It was revealed in the show that he was born in Kirkdale, Liverpool. For many years this article believed Wallasey was his place of birth and this information was likely copied by other media including obituaries when Hughes died. This wrong place of birth information was not verified at the time it first appeared here.

Hughes usually appeared in pantomime over the Christmas period. He appeared on That Antony Cotton Show on 6 September 2007, in which he spoke about his role in a short film called Expresso, which also starred Sir Norman Wisdom. Hughes played the part of a man who visits a coffee shop for a "normal" coffee but is served by a pompous waiter. The film was sold in aid of Macmillan Cancer Support.

In 2007, he performed the Angel Gabriel in the BBC production Liverpool Nativity. From 2007, he also appeared as uncle Keith in the first three series of the E4 drama Skins.

In 2009 he played Frank in Tim Firth's Absolutely Frank at the Oldham Coliseum Theatre and at the Harrogate Theatre.

== Personal life ==
Hughes married Susan Mundell in 1975. His off-stage interests included sailing, football, golf, cricket, rock music, dendrology (trees), and beer. He was the Honorary Squire of the Dartington Morris Men and made an appearance at the Dartington Morris Ring meeting in September 2008. His musical interests included British folk rock and he compered at Fairport's Cropredy Convention annual music festival several times. He was a supporter of Everton Football Club. On 10 June 2009 he was appointed Deputy Lieutenant of the Isle of Wight. This entitled him to the Post Nominal Letters "DL" for Life.

== Illness and death ==
Hughes received a diagnosis of prostate cancer in 1996. In 2010, he collapsed at home with extreme back pain. He was diagnosed with a relapse of prostate cancer, at which point he retired from acting. He died from his illness on 27 July 2012, aged 68. Doctors stated that he died "peacefully in his sleep".

== Filmography ==
Year	Title	Role	Notes
1967	Smashing Time	Builder	
1968	The Bofors Gun	Pvt. Samuel (cook)	
1968	Yellow Submarine	Paul McCartney	
1968	Till Death Us Do Part	Mike's Brother	
1969	The Virgin Soldiers	Lantry	
1970	The Man Who Had Power Over Women	Policeman	
1971	The Blood on Satan's Claw	Drinking Villager	
1971	Revenge	Fred	
1971	Carry On at Your Convenience	Willie	
1973	Adolf Hitler: My Part in His Downfall	Larry	
1973	Tiffany Jones	Georg	
1976	Confessions of a Driving Instructor	Postman	
1980	Nijinsky	Gavrilov	

== Television ==
Year	Title	Role	Notes
1966	The Likely Lads	Podge	3 episodes
1966	BBC Play of the Month	Second Workman	Episode: "The Making of Jericho"
1966-1967	ITV Play of the Week	Frank Monoghan/Chris Smitheringale	2 episodes
1967	The Saint	Party Boy	Episode: The Power Artists
1967-1972	Thirty-Minute Theatre	Lance-Corporal Williams/Chuck	2 episodes
1967, 1974–1983, 1987	Coronation Street	Phil Ferguson/Eddie Yeats	511 episodes
1968–1974	Z Cars	Billy Garvin, Wynne, Bartram, Mickey	5 episodes
1969	Please Sir	Turner	Episode: "They're Off"
1969	Curry and Chips	Dick	6 episodes
1970	Randall and Hopkirk (Deceased)	Harper	Episode: "Somebody Just Walked Over My Grave"
1970	The Wednesday Play	Flash Blakey	Episode: "The Hunting of Lionel Crane"
1970	Up Pompeii!	Piteous	Episode: "Vestal Virgins"
1971	Play for Today	Derek	Episode: "The Pigeon Fancier"
1972	Dad's Army	The Bridge Corporal	Episode: "Brain Versus Brawn"
1974	No, Honestly	Derek	Episode: "The Object of the Game"
1974	Crown Court	Robert Sims	Serial: "Winklers"
1975	Don't Drink the Water	Frank	Episode: "Helping Hand"
1985	The Bright Side	Mr. Lithgow	5 episodes
1986	Doctor Who	Mr. Popplewick	Serial: "The Ultimate Foe"
1989–1993	I, Lovett	Dirk	
1990	Screen Two	DS Bailey	Episode: "The Man from the Pru"
1990	ScreenPlay	Repo Man	Episode: "Needle"
1990	Coasting	Ray Hartley	Episode: "Offshore"
1990	You Rang, M'Lord?	Sir Fred Kendal	Episode: "Royal Flush"
1990-1991	Making Out	Dilk	4 episodes
1990–1995	Keeping Up Appearances	Onslow	44 episodes
1992	Boon	Tiny Tim	Episode: "Message in a Bottle"
1993	The Upper Hand	Ray	Episode: "Misery"
1997	The Memoirs of Hyacinth Bucket	Onslow	TV film
1998–2008	The Royle Family	Twiggy	8 episodes
2001–2005, 2007	Heartbeat	Vernon Scripps	88 episodes
2007	Casualty	Si Blake	Episode: "Brass in Pocket"
2007	Keeping Up Appearances: Life Lessons from Onslow	Onslow	TV film
2007–2009	Skins	Fat B*stard, Brandy, Uncle Keith	4 episodes
