= Young Hyacinth =

British sitcom

- Genre: Sitcom
- Written by: Roy Clarke
- Directed by: Sandy Johnson
- Starring: Kerry Howard; Mark Addy; Tamla Kari; Katherine Pearce; Katie Redford; Oliver Stokes; Danny Wilkes; Sam Strike
- Country of origin: United Kingdom
- Original language: English
- No. of episodes: 1

Production
- Executive producer: Gareth Edwards
- Producer: Sarah Hitchcock
- Running time: 30 minutes
- Production company: BBC Studios

Original release
- Network: BBC One
- Release: 2 September 2016

Related
- Keeping Up Appearances

Young Hyacinth is a prequel to the British sitcom Keeping Up Appearances, written by original writer Roy Clarke. The one-off special, set some forty years before the events of Keeping Up Appearances, follows the early life of Hyacinth Walton (later Bucket), as she desperately attempts to better her sisters and father. The special premiered on 2 September 2016 on BBC One as part of the BBC Landmark Sitcom Season. Patricia Routledge, who originated the role of Hyacinth, was critical of the BBC’s decision to make this prequel, saying “Why are they doing this sort of thing? They must be desperate.”

== Cast ==
- Kerry Howard as Hyacinth Walton
- Mark Addy as Daddy
- Tamla Kari as Violet Walton
- Katherine Pearce as Daisy Walton
- Katie Redford as Rose Walton
- Tony Gardner as Claude
- Debra Stephenson as Dulcie
- Tim Downie as Freddy
- James Wrighton as William

== Summary ==
In the late 1950s, young-adult Hyacinth Walton spends her days working as a domestic servant for the wealthy but troubled Cooper-Smiths by day, then returns to the small canal cottage that is home to her, her three younger sisters (Daisy, Violet, and Rose), and their alcoholic father. Impressed by her eccentric employers, Hyacinth vows to escape her poor background and enter the elegant upper-class world.

== Broadcast ==
The show was broadcast on 2 September 2016 on BBC One in the United Kingdom and 4.14 million viewers watched the show within seven days of its broadcast, making it the 22nd-most-watched BBC One show for the week ending 4 September. 4.39 million viewers watched the show within 28 days of its initial broadcast.
