= Mary Millar =

English actress (1936–1998)

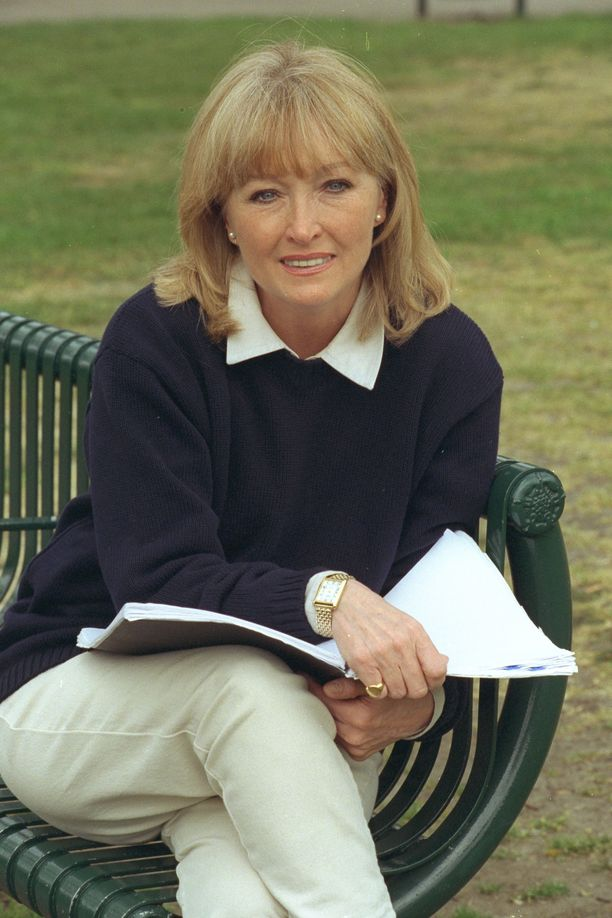
- Millar in 1997
- Born: Irene Mary Wetton; 26 July 1936; Doncaster, West Riding of Yorkshire, England
- Died: 10 November 1998 (aged 62); Brockley, London, England
- Occupations: Actress, singer
- Years active: 1952–1998
- Spouse: Rafael Frame (m. 1962)
- Children: 1

Irene Mary Wetton (26 July 1936 – 10 November 1998), better known by her stage name Mary Millar, was an English actress and singer best remembered for her role as the second actress to play Rose in the BBC sitcom Keeping Up Appearances from 1991 to 1995 and for originating the role of Madame Giry in Andrew Lloyd Webber's musical The Phantom of the Opera.

== Early life ==
Millar was born in Doncaster, England, on 26 July 1936, to Irene (née Mellor) and Horace Wetton, both music hall singers. She intended to become a stable hand, but later decided to pursue a stage career. She toured the country with her parents, who had an act called Sweethearts in Harmony.

== Career ==
Millar made her debut in theatre in 1952, in a production of Babes in the Wood with comedy duo Morcombe and Wise at the Empire Theatre, Sheffield at the age of 16.

She made her first television appearance the following year in 1953, in Those Were the Days. She also made appearances on The Dick Emery Show and The Stanley Baxter Show.

In 1960, Millar travelled to New York to understudy Julie Andrews in Camelot. She began her West End career in 1962 as Cloris in Lock Up Your Daughters. In 1969, she played the title role in the musical Ann Veronica, based on H. G. Wells's novel. In 1986, Millar originated the role of Madame Giry in Andrew Lloyd Webber's musical The Phantom of the Opera. She played the role for four years and her voice appears on the original cast album.

Millar gained acclaim for her part in Keeping Up Appearances as Rose. She replaced Shirley Stelfox from the beginning of series 2 in 1991, as Stelfox had prior commitments to the series Making Out. Millar remained with the programme until its end in 1995.

From 1997 to 1998, Millar played Mrs Potts in the London production of Beauty and the Beast. She also appeared on the cast album. In February 1998, Millar left the show because of deteriorating health.

== Personal life, illness and death ==
Millar married photographer Rafael D. Frame in November 1962; the marriage produced one child. Millar was a practising Christian.

In January 1998, Millar was diagnosed with ovarian cancer and underwent chemotherapy. She died on 10 November 1998, aged 62, in Brockley, London, with her husband and daughter at her bedside. Three weeks before her death, when asked what she would do when she arrived at heaven's door, Millar said, "Rehearse for a part in the Angelic choir, darling." An episode of Keeping Up Appearances was broadcast on BBC One the following week and dedicated to her.

== Works ==
=== Television ===
| Year | Title | Role | Notes |
|---|---|---|---|
| 1953 | Those Were the Days | | |
| 1963, 1964 | The Dick Emery Show | | |
| 1963–71 | The Stanley Baxter Show | | |
| 1967 | Titipu | Yum-Yum | BBC2 production |
| 1968 | Iolanthe | Phyllis | BBC2 production |
| 1970 | Rookery Nook | Poppy Dickie | |
| 1991–95 | Keeping Up Appearances | Rose | series 2 to series 5 |

=== Theatre ===
| Year | Play | Role | Theatre | Notes |
|---|---|---|---|---|
| 1952, 1954–55 | Babes in the Wood | Principal character | The Empire Theatre, Sheffield (1952); Derby Hippodrome Theatre (1954–55) | |
| 1957, 1959 | The Desert Song | Margot Bonvalet | His Majesty's Theatre, Aberdeen | 1967 studio recording |
| 1958–59 | Old Chelsea | Mary Fenton | King's Theatre, Glasgow | |
| 1960 | Camelot | Queen Guenevere | Majestic Theatre, Manhattan | Julie Andrews' understudy |
| 1962 | Lock Up Your Daughters | Cloris | Mermaid Theatre; Her Majesty's Theatre | |
| 1963 | See You Inside | | Duchess Theatre | |
| 1963–64 | All in Love | Lydia Languish | Mayfair Theatre | Based on The Rivals by Richard Brinsley Sheridan |
| 1965 | Dearest Dracula | Lucy | Olympia Theatre, Dublin | |
| 1966 | Seven Brides for Seven Brothers | Milly | | 1966 recording |
| 1967–68, 1971 | Bless the Bride | | Richmond Theatre | 1967 studio recording |
| 1967 | Love From a Stranger | Cecily Harrington | Queen's Theatre, Hornchurch | |
| 1967 | Virtue in Danger | Berinthia | Queen's Theatre, Hornchurch | |
| 1968 | The Rivals | Lydia Languish | Queen's Theatre, Hornchurch | |
| 1969 | The Real Inspector Hound | Cynthia | Queen's Theatre, Hornchurch | |
| 1969 | Black Comedy | Clea | Queen's Theatre, Hornchurch | |
| 1969 | Ann Veronica | Ann Veronica Stanley | Cambridge Theatre | Cast recording |
| 1970 | Spider's Web | Clarissa Hailsham-Brown | Queen's Theatre, Hornchurch | |
| 1972 | Popkiss | Poppy Dickie | Globe Theatre; Cambridge Arts Theatre | |
| 1973 | The Importance of Being Earnest | Honourable Gwendolen Fairfax | Queen's Theatre, Hornchurch | |
| 1975 | Small and Brassy | | King's Head Theatre; Wyndham's Theatre | |
| 1978 | Lark Rise | Emma Timms | Royal National Theatre | |
| 1984 | Pack of Lies | Barbara Jackson | Lyric Theatre, London | Replacing Judi Dench |
| 1985, 1993–94 | Follies | Sally Durant Plummer | Forum Theatre, Wythenshawe; Brighton Dome; Haymarket Theatre | |
| 1986–90 | The Phantom of the Opera | Madame Giry | Her Majesty's Theatre | Leader of bible studies between shows, cast recording |
| 1993 | Jack and the Beanstalk | | | |
| 1995 | Snow White and the Seven Dwarfs | The Wicked Witch | | |
| 1996 | Follies: In Concert | | National Concert Hall, Dublin | |
| 1997–98 | Beauty and the Beast | Mrs Potts | Dominion Theatre | Cast recording |
| | Pal Joey | | | |
| | The King and I | Anna | Wolsey Theatre, Ipswich | |
| | The Mating Game | | | |
| | An Evening with Mary Millar | | | One-woman show Talking about her Christianity, life and work |
