= Judge Romesh =

British comedy television show

- Title screen
- Genre: Court show Comedy
- Written by: Geoff Norcott
- Directed by: Ollie Bartlett
- Presented by: Romesh Ranganathan
- Starring: Tom Davis; Kerry Howard (series 1); Jessica Knappett (series 2)
- Country of origin: United Kingdom
- Original language: English
- No. of series: 2
- No. of episodes: 22 (+5 online specials)

Production
- Executive producers: Dan Baldwin; Andy Price
- Producer: Sarah Pack
- Running time: 30 mins (incl. adverts)
- Production company: Hungry Bear Media

Original release
- Network: Dave
- Release: 8 August 2018 – 26 June 2019

Judge Romesh is a British comedy television show broadcast on Dave. It features Romesh Ranganathan settling disputes in a fictional civil court. The show is unscripted, and the claimant and defendant are generally members of the public, although some cases are between celebrities. Ranganathan is assisted by the bailiff, Tom Davis, and a clerk—Kerry Howard in series 1 and Jessica Knappett in series 2.

The first series of ten episodes premiered on 8 August 2018. A second series of twelve episodes began on 22 May 2019. Five extra cases are available on UKTV Play. The show received mixed critical reception and has been compared to other court shows such as Judge Rinder.

== Format ==
Each episode features two cases and begins with Romesh Ranganathan entering the courtroom to flashing lights and hip-hop music. For each case, bailiff Tom Davis is sent to collect the claimant and defendant, who he briefly chats with. In court, the claimant brings up an issue with the defendant which they would like resolved. One example is a man whose friend duped him into attending a dating course under the pretence that it was a holiday, and who wanted the friend to refund him. Another is a case of a woman whose boyfriend kept ruining her underwear by wearing it and who wanted the boyfriend to stop. Ranganathan takes statements from each party, interjecting with jokes and mockery and asking questions. The court clerk (Kerry Howard in Series 1 and Jessica Knappett in Series 2) presents information related to the case, such as text messages or photographs. Some cases involve songs, dances or magic tricks, which are performed for the court. Ranganathan then asks for closing statements from each party and makes a decision in favour of the claimant, the defendant or neither party.

== Production ==
On 23 January 2018, UKTV announced that Judge Romesh had been commissioned for ten half-hour episodes. The first series aired between 8 August and 5 September. Five extra cases lasting 10 minutes were released on UKTV Play under the title Judge Romesh: Justice Never Sleeps. For the first series, 34 cases were filmed over three days at Pinewood Studios. Three of the cases involved celebrities—Shaun Ryder and Bez, Antony Costa and Duncan James and Stevi Ritchie and Chloe Jasmine—while the remaining cases were between members of the public.

Commissioned by Joe McVey, the programme was produced by Hungry Bear Media for Dave, a British channel owned by UKTV. Dan Baldwin and Andy Price served as executive producers and Sarah Pack was the producer. Geoff Norcott wrote additional material and Ollie Bartlett was the director. Post-production was done by Suite TV. According to Baldwin, the courtroom set was inspired by the styles of British courtrooms and Hollywood films. A live audience was used. Shooting was done in 360 degrees with five cameras. Ranganathan says that he did no legal research prior to filming, as he wanted to judge based on instincts. He describes the cases as "genuine grievances", although they vary in severity.

In November 2018, the programme was renewed for a second series. British Comedy Guide later reported that series would likely be filmed in January 2019 at Pinewood Studios. In March, it was announced that the series would have twelve episodes, and Jessica Knappett would replace Kerry Howard as court clerk for the second series. Howard commented on social media that she had felt out of place as clerk and wanted to spend more time with her son.

== Ratings ==
For each of the first two series, two episodes aired at a time on Wednesdays at 10 p.m. on Dave. Ratings data is taken from BARB.

=== Series 1 ===
Episode No.	Airdate	28 day viewers (millions)	Dave weekly ranking
1	8 August 2018	0.608	1
2	8 August 2018	0.492	2
3	15 August 2018	0.392	1
4	15 August 2018	0.362	2
5	22 August 2018	0.235	6
6	22 August 2018	0.235	8
7	29 August 2018	0.292	1
8	29 August 2018	0.274	3
9	5 September 2018	0.365	2
10	5 September 2018	0.309	4

=== Series 2 ===
Episode No.	Airdate	28 day viewers (millions)	Dave weekly ranking
1	22 May 2019	0.357	3
2	22 May 2019	0.389	2
3	29 May 2019	0.321	2
4	29 May 2019	0.279	3
5	5 June 2019	0.372	2
6	5 June 2019	0.278	4
7	12 June 2019	0.295	3
8	12 June 2019	0.260	8
9	19 June 2019	0.280	4
10	19 June 2019	0.263	5
11	26 June 2019	0.337	2
12	26 June 2019	0.253	6

== Reception ==
According to Dave, the first series reached 3.7 million viewers. The show has been described as "a twist on soapy courtroom programmes" and compared to Judge Rinder, Judge Judy and The Jeremy Kyle Show.

Bruce Dessau of Beyond the Joke writes in a positive review that the show is "interesting set-up", Ranganathan is "pretty damn funny" and Davis is "such a big personality, he almost upstages Ranganathan". Steve Bennett of Chortle gives the show three out of five stars. Bennett writes that the show is "not a revolutionary formula" and criticises the short ten-minute slot for each case. He criticises that Howard is underused, but praises that the casting of Ranganathan as judge perfectly fits his "grumpy, intolerant and judgmental" comedy persona. A negative review in The Times says that "the cases quickly become tiresome and there's a mean-spirited vibe."

Reviewing the second series, Barbara Speed of i gave the programme three out of five stars, praising it as a reality television show that demonstrates "you can combine members of the public, their problems and some good-natured mockery without tipping over into exploitation".
