= Rita Webb =

English actress (1904–1981)

- Born: Olive Rita Webb; 25 February 1904; Willesden, Middlesex, England
- Died: 30 August 1981 (aged 77); London, England
- Occupation: Comedy actress
- Years active: 1950–1981
- Spouse(s): Lionel Stanley "Thommie" Thompson (m. 1926; sep. 19??)
- Relatives: George Webb (half-brother); Leonard Keysor (cousin)

Olive Rita Webb (25 February 1904 – 30 August 1981), later known as Olive Rita Thompson, was an English character actress, mainly in comedy roles. She was the eldest child of Henry Augustus Webb (1880–1926) and Rose Jeannette Keysor. She had a younger brother, Henry Richard Webb, also an actor, and two elder identical twin half-brothers, Leslie and Gordon Durlacher, from her mother's first marriage to Samuel Durlacher. A half-brother was the actor George Webb.

== Career ==
Born in Willesden, Middlesex, United Kingdom, she is best known for her appearances as a stooge for Benny Hill in The Benny Hill Show, his long-running Thames Television series. At under five feet tall, with a booming voice and dyed flame-red hair, she was often cast as a blousey mother-in-law or Cockney type character.

In 1958, she, Roger Livesey, Terry-Thomas, Judith Furse, Avril Angers, and Miles Malleson, recorded "Indian Summer of an Uncle" and "Jeeves Takes Charge" for the Caedmon Audio record label (Caedmon Audio TC-1137). It was released in stereo in 1964.

In the 1960s, she made a number of television appearances with Billy Cotton and alongside Arthur Haynes. Her many other television credits include several appearances in Spike Milligan's Q series, Dixon of Dock Green, Till Death Us Do Part, Sykes, Up Pompeii! with Frankie Howerd, The Wednesday Play and Steptoe and Son. In the Space: 1999 episode "The Taybor" she appeared as a deliberately unattractive form assumed by the shapeshifter Maya.

She also appeared in supporting roles in many films, including To Sir, with Love (1967), The Magic Christian (1969), Alfred Hitchcock's Frenzy (1972), Confessions of a Pop Performer (1975) and Come Play with Me (1977).

== Personal life and death ==
Following her separation from her husband, she lived with Al Jeffery "Jeffie", an accomplished banjo player, whom she adored. She was called "Podge" by Jeffie and was proud that she still had all her own teeth. She signed her letters "Dame Rita Webb" and refused to appear on the TV show This is Your Life. She and her brother were exceptionally close and they talked every night on the telephone until her death.

Webb died in 1981, aged 77, from cancer. Her funeral was held at West London Crematorium and a memorial service took place at St Paul's, Covent Garden.

== Selected filmography ==
- Moulin Rouge (1952) – woman on balcony emptying bucket (uncredited)
- Hindle Wakes (1952) – Mrs Slaughter
- Double Exposure (1954) – flower-seller
- The Silken Affair (1956) – minor role (uncredited)
- No Trees in the Street (1959) – Mrs Brown
- The Boy and the Bridge (1959) – landlady
- Suddenly, Last Summer (1959) – asylum inmate (uncredited)
- Urge to Kill (1960) – charwoman
- The Naked Edge (1961) – Cleaner (uncredited)
- The Young Ones (1961) – woman in market
- The Boys (1962) – Mrs Lee
- The Bay of St Michel (1963) – landlady
- Sparrows Can't Sing (1963) – neighbour in tower block (uncredited)
- The Small World of Sammy Lee (1963) – cleaner (uncredited)
- The Three Lives of Thomasina (1963) – gypsy Granny (uncredited)
- A Place to Go (1964) – woman in wash house (uncredited)
- The Bargee (1964) – onlooker (uncredited)
- He Who Rides a Tiger (1965) – flower-seller
- The Idol (1966) – landlady
- Stranger in the House (1967) – Mrs Plaskett (uncredited)
- To Sir, with Love (1967) – Mrs Joseph
- The Man Outside (1967) – landlady
- Mrs Brown, You've Got a Lovely Daughter (1968) – woman in pub (uncredited)
- The Strange Affair (1968) – Charley's Mum
- The Nine Ages of Nakedness (1969) – Brunhilda (segment "The Theatre")
- Zeta One (1969) – clippie
- The Magic Christian (1969) – woman in park (uncredited)
- Percy (1971) – Mrs Hedges
- Up Pompeii (1971) – Cassandra
- Up the Chastity Belt (1971) – Maid Marian
- Steptoe and Son (1972) – Auntie Ada
- Till Death Us Do Part (1972) – Hotel Landlady
- Frenzy (1972) – Mrs Rusk (uncredited)
- The Best of Benny Hill (1974) – various roles
- Confessions of a Pop Performer (1975) – Fanny's mother
- I'm Not Feeling Myself Tonight (1976) – Tea Lady
- Come Play with Me (1977) – Madam Rita
- Revenge of the Pink Panther (1978) – lady at window
- The Hound of the Baskervilles (1978) – elder masseuse (uncredited)
- The London Connection (1979) – cockney woman
- Can I Come Too? (1979) – Laverne
- Venom (1981) – Mrs Loewenthal
