= Marion Barron =

Scottish actress

- Born: Marion Barron; 28 March 1958 (age 68); British Nigeria
- Occupation: Actress
- Years active: 1987–present
- Spouse: Simon Fuller (m. 1982)
- Children: 2

Marion Barron (born 28 March 1958) is a Scottish actress. She is best known for playing the vicar's wife in the successful BBC sitcom, Keeping Up Appearances from 1990 to 1995. Other notable works include Don't Wait Up (1983) and Screen Two (1985).

== Early life ==
Marion Barron was born on 28 March 1958 in British Nigeria. She grew up Dumfries, Scotland.

== Career ==
Barron's first screen credit was as a hotel receptionist in the successful sitcom Don't Wait Up, starring Nigel Havers, Tony Britton and Dinah Sheridan, and was produced and directed by Harold Snoad, but her best known role was as the timid yet fiery vicar's wife alongside Patricia Routledge, Josephine Tewson, Clive Swift and Judy Cornwell in the BBC's hit sitcom Keeping Up Appearances (also produced and directed by Harold Snoad) from 1990 to 1995. She has also appeared in Screen Two and The Bill.

== Personal life ==
Barron is married to Simon Fuller and they have two children.

== Filmography ==
Year	Title	Role	Notes
1987	Don't Wait Up	Hotel receptionist	Series 4, episode 1
1990	Screen Two	Sister	Episode: "Children Crossing"
1990-1995	Keeping Up Appearances	The Vicar's Wife	11 episodes
1991	The Bill	Nurse	Episode: "Joey"
1997	Holding the Baby	Libby	Episode: "Trouble in Toytown"
2017	Number 13	Claudette	Short film
2019	Collision	Claudette	Short film
2019	This Time with Alan Partridge	Val	Comic Relief special
2020	We Hunt Together	Vicar	Episode: "101"
