= Jeremy Gittins =

British actor

- Born: Philip Jeremy Gittins; 30 January 1956 (age 70); Manchester, England
- Occupation: Actor
- Years active: 1980–2008, 2020, 2023
- Spouse: Sara Hollamby

Philip Jeremy Gittins (born 30 January 1956) is a British actor from Manchester, England, who is known for his role as Michael the 'dishy' Church of England vicar in the successful BBC One sitcom Keeping Up Appearances from 1990 to 1995.

== Career ==
Gittins has also appeared in many popular British sitcoms and leading television programmes. He has appeared in Doctor Who alongside Fourth Doctor Tom Baker and Lalla Ward, Tenko, Boon, A Touch of Frost, New Tricks, EastEnders (as John Charrington), Doctors and, more recently he has starred in Footballers' Wives in 2005.

As well as Keeping Up Appearances, he has also made appearances in several other sitcoms, namely Fresh Fields, Terry and June, Andy Capp, Blackadder Goes Forth and The Upper Hand.

== Television roles ==
Year	Title	Role	Notes
1980	Keep It In The Family	Dave	Episode: "And Not A Drop To Drink"
1981	Doctor Who	Laslo	Episode: "Warrior's Gate".
1981	Wet Job	Robin Miller	
1981	Tenko	Brian Thomas	
1984	Mitch	Barman	Episode: "Sleeping Dogs"
1985	Summer Season	The Announcer	Episode: "Radio Pictures"
1985	Full House	Man in Pub	Episode: " Semper Fidelis"
1986 to 1988	All in Good Faith	PC Eric Weatherall	
1986	Fresh Fields	Floor Manager	
1987	Terry and June	Constable Davenport	Episode: "The Eye of the Householder"
1988	Tales of the Unexpected	Dominic	Episode (9/6): "Wink Three Times"
1988	Andy Capp	Keith	
1989	Boon	Car Salesman	
1989	Blackadder Goes Forth	Private Tipplewick	Episode: "Corporal Punishment"
1990 to 1995	Keeping Up Appearances	Michael the Vicar	Series 1 to Series 5
1996	The Upper Hand	Dr. Anderson	Episode: "Surgical Spirit"
2000	EastEnders	John Charrington	
2000	Doctors	Matthew Carlton	Episode: "Choices"
2002	The House That Jack Built	Boris Bates	Episode: "Dogs Don't Wear Hard Hats"
2004	A Touch of Frost	Mark	
2004	New Tricks	Vic	Episode: "Good Work Rewarded"
2004	Doctors	Clifford Durran	Episode: "Noughts and Crosses"
2005	Footballer's Wives	Levy	
2008	Midsomer Murders	Officer	Episode: "Shot at Dawn"
2020	Pointless	Himself	Contestant
2023	Keeping Up Appearances - 30 Years Of Laughs	Himself/Vicar	
