= Kerry Howard =

English actress (born 1982)

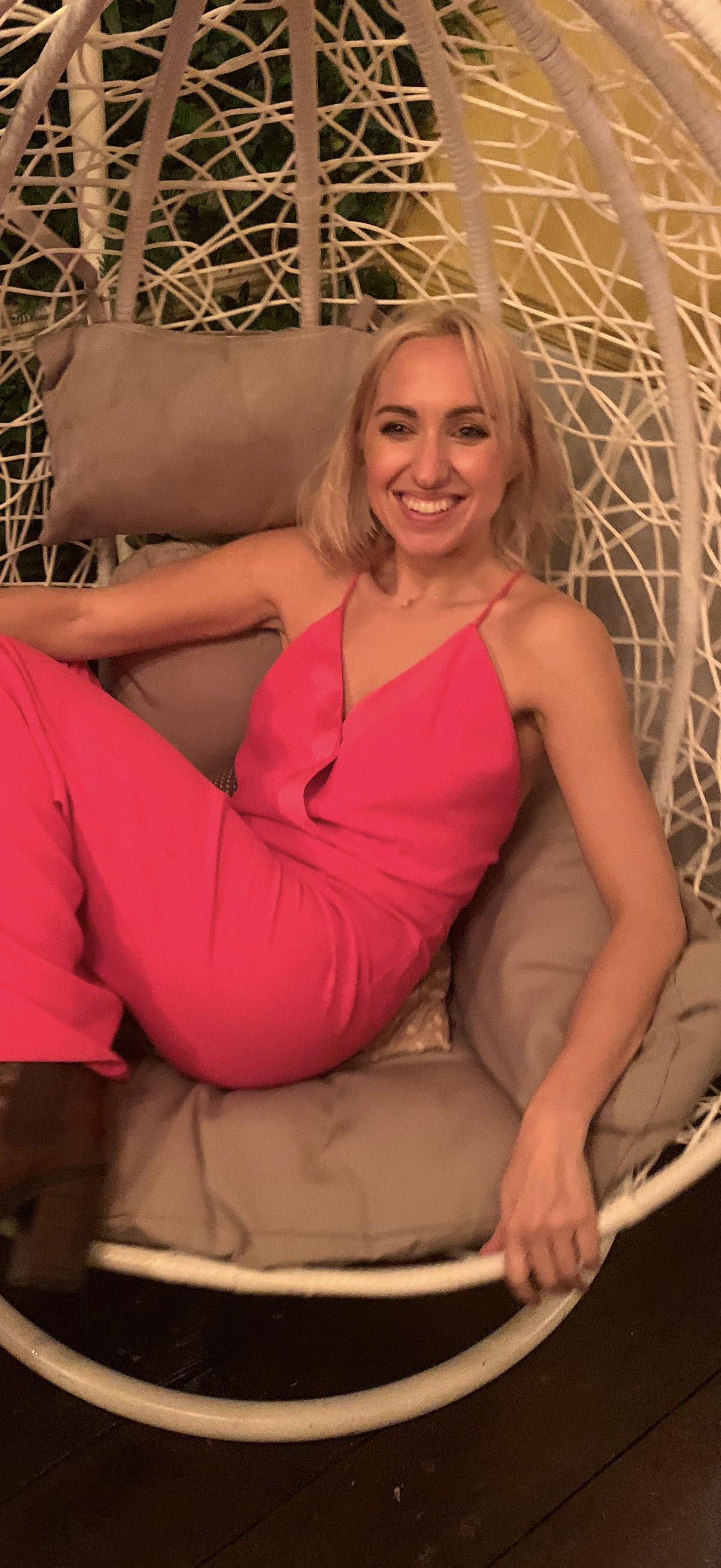
- Kerry Howard in 2020
- Born: Kerry Elizabeth Howard; 24 March 1982 (age 44); Yeovil, Somerset, England
- Occupation: Actress
- Years active: 2009–present
- Notable work: Him & Her, Witless
- Spouse: Gabriel Vick (m. 2012; div. 2018)
- Children: 2
- Relatives: Russell Howard (brother)

Kerry Elizabeth Howard (born 24 March 1982) is an English actress.

== Early life ==
Howard was born to Dave and Ninette Howard in 1982. She has a twin brother called Daniel and is the younger sister of comedian Russell Howard. She graduated with a BA (Hons) in Drama from Edge Hill University in 2003.

== Career ==
Howard played Laura in the BBC Three comedy series Him & Her and Leanne in Witless. She also appears in BBC Three "Feed My Funny" comedy sketches with Lu Corfield and acted as courtroom clerk in the first series of Judge Romesh.

== Personal life ==
Howard divorced her husband in 2018, and sought custody of her children.

== Filmography ==
=== Film ===
Year	Title	Role	Notes
2009	Peacock Season	Party Girl	
2012	The Wedding Video	Mrs. Ring Pillow	
2013	I Give It a Year	Clare	
2016	London Town	Penelope	
2022	National Theatre Live: Jack Absolute Flies Again	Lucy	
2022	How to Disappear	Nina Moyse	Short film
2023	Love at First Sight	Maid of Honour Violet	
2025	Dreamers	Lisa	
2025	Departures	Jackie	
2025	Bad Apples	PC Williams	

=== Television ===
Year	Title	Role	Notes
2009	Comedy Showcase	Various roles	Series 2; episode 6: "Girl Friday"
2009	Things Talk	Dan's Girlfriend	Television film
2009–2010	Reggie Perrin	Vicky	Series 1 & 2; 12 episodes
2010	Meet the Parents	Sister	Series 1; episode 6: "Ex-Army"
2010–2013	Him & Her	Laura	Main role. Series 1–4; 24 episodes British Academy Television Award for Best Female Comedy Performance (nominated)
2011	Two Pints of Lager and a Packet of Crisps	Hazel	Series 9; episode 5: "Shagger"
2011	Comedy Showcase	Colette	Series 3; episode 3: "The Fun Police"
2011	Mongrels	Rickshaw Mother	Series 2; episode 2: "Kali and the Rickshaw Inferno"
2013	Love Matters	Waitress	Episode 4: "Aphrodite Fry"
2013	Comedy Feeds	Various	BBC sketch show. Series 2; episode 3: "Kerry". Also writer
2014	Drifters	Chelsea	Series 2; episode 5: "Hen Don't"
2014	Give Out Girls	Marilyn	Episodes 1–6
2014	Russell Howard's Good News	Mother of Baby	Series 9; episode 3
2015	Doc Martin	Alexandra Lucas	Series 7; episode 6: "Other People's Children"
2015	Crackanory	Parent (Thora) / Clara Winkleface	Series 3; episodes 2 & 4: "The Catchment Area" & "Abbatnoir"
2015	A Gert Lush Christmas	Julie Colman	Television film
2015, 2017	Drunk History	Herself - Drunk Storyteller	Series 1; episodes 1 & 6, and series 3; episode 4
2016	Murder in Successville	Katy Perry	Series 2; episode 5: "Head, Shoulders, Knees & Toes"
2016	Borderline	Stacey Allen	Series 1; episode 2: "The Hens"
2016	Young Hyacinth	Hyacinth	One-off prequel to Keeping Up Appearances
2016	We the Jury	Fiona	Pilot episode
2016–2018	Witless	Leanne	Main character. Series 1–3; 15 episodes
2017	Murder in Successville	Madonna	Series 3; episode 3: "I Saw a Monster!"
2017	Would I Lie to You?	Herself - Contestant	Series 11; Christmas special
2018	Judge Romesh	Herself - Court Clerk	Series 1; episodes 1–10
2018	Urban Myths	Marsha Hunt	Series 2; episode 2: "Backstage at Live Aid"
2019	Four Weddings and a Funeral	Poppy	Mini-series; episodes 4 & 6: "The Winner Takes It All" & "Lights, Camera, Wedding"
2020	The Trouble with Maggie Cole	Kelly Roberts	Episodes 1–3, 5 & 6
2020	Two Weeks to Live	Beth	Episodes 3–6
2020	Finding Joy	Christie	Series 2; episodes 1–6
2021	Russell Howard: Lubricant	Herself	Netflix special
2021	Ted Lasso	Sarah Coombes	Season 2; episode 9: "Beard After Hours"
2021	The Outlaws	Trace	Series 1; episode 6
2022	Richard Osman's House of Games	Herself - Contestant	Series 6; episodes 21–25 (week 5)
2023	Beyond Paradise	Cleo Davenport	Series 1; episode 5
2023	Black Ops	Jen	Series 1; episode 1
2024–2025	Waterloo Road	Serena Michelle Davies	Recurring role. Series 13–15; 8 episodes
