= Charmian May =

English actress (1937–2002)

- Photo: 1981 West End programme
- Born: Charmian Rosemary May; 16 June 1937; Purbrook, Hampshire, England
- Died: 24 October 2002 (aged 65); Purbrook, Hampshire, England
- Occupation: Actress
- Years active: 1962–2002

Charmian Rosemary May (16 June 1937 – 24 October 2002) was an English character actress. She appeared in the sitcoms The Good Life, The Upper Hand and Keeping Up Appearances, and the film Bridget Jones's Diary. She appeared as Miss Pershore in episodes 6 and 7 of The Fall and Rise of Reginald Perrin (1976).

She also appeared in The Worst Witch as Miss Pentangle, in Weirdsister College as Prof. Alicia Thunderblast, and she was Miss Milton in the Yorkshire Television series, You're Only Young Twice.

Amongst her stage work, May was in the original production of 84, Charing Cross Road at Salisbury Playhouse, and its West End transfer, in 1981. She also toured in the 1970s in a production of The Importance of Being Earnest by Oscar Wilde, playing Lady Bracknell.

== Death ==
May died from cancer on 24 October 2002, aged 65. A service of thanksgiving for the life of the actress was held at St Paul's, Covent Garden on 23 May 2003.

== Filmography ==
Television
Year	Title	Role	Notes
1968	Mr. Rose	Nemone Regan	Series 2, episode 3
1974	The Fortunes of Nigel	Martha Trapbois	Miniseries (episodes 3, 4 & 5)
1974–75	Second Time Around	Joan	Series 1–2 (5 episodes)
1975	My Honourable Mrs	Joyce Harper	Series 1, episode 2
1976	The Good Life	Mrs Weaver	Series 2, episodes 6 & 7
1976	Within These Walls	Sarah Lang	Series 4, episode 1
1976	The Fall and Rise of Reginald Perrin	Miss Pershore	Series 1, episodes 6 & 7
1977	Miss Jones and Son	Miss Chalcott	Series 1, episode 4
1977–81	You're Only Young Twice	Miss Marjorie Milton	Series 1–4 (main role, 31 episodes)
1977	The Duchess of Duke Street	Danish Countess	Series 2, episode 16
1978	The Prime of Miss Jean Brodie	Mrs Camel	Series 1, episode 1
1978	This Is Your Life	Herself	Series 18, episode 12 (Pat Coombs)
1979	Prince Regent	Lady Ann Hamilton	Series 1, episode 8
1980	The Gentle Touch	Mrs Ridgeway	Series 1, episode 5
1980	Rings on Their Fingers	Shop Assistant	Series 3, episode 1
1980	The Professionals	Miss Piper	Series 4, episode 15
1981	Bognor	Dog Woman	Series 1, episode 15
1982	Educating Marmalade	Clara Coalhouse	Series 1, episode 4
1983	Nanny	Miss Vita Baggs	Series 3, episode 3
1983	Tears Before Bedtime	Miss Ledbetter	Series 1, episode 2 & 3
1984	Letty	Mrs Gore	Series 1, episodes 3 & 4
1987	A Dorothy L. Sayers Mystery	Miss Hillyard	Series 1, episodes 8, 9 & 10
1987	My Family and Other Animals	Melanie	Series 1, episode 5
1989	The New Statesman	Game Show Producer	Series 2, episode 2
1989	The Nineteenth Hole	Miranda	Series 1 (4 episodes)
1990	Screen One	Consultant	Series 2, episode 5
1990–92	Keeping Up Appearances	Councillor Mrs Nugent	Series 1–3 (3 episodes)
1991	Poirot	Lady Runcorn	Series 3, episode 7
1991	The Sharp End	Mrs Hemstock	Series 1, episode 2
1992	The Old Boy Network	Secretary	Series 1, episode 1
1992	Harry Enfield's Television Programme		Series 2, episode 2
1992	Sean's Show	Scriptwriter	Series 1, episode 6
1992	The Upper Hand	Dr Barratt	Series 4, episode 5
1992	The Darling Buds of May	Gerry Lubbock	Series 2, episode 7
1994	Love Hurts	Dorothea	Series 3, episode 9
1995	The Politician's Wife	Mrs Lucas	Miniseries (3 episodes)
1995	Soldier Soldier	Mrs Tredwell	Series 5, episode 5
1997	Touching Evil	Dr Wanda Galley	Series 1, episode 1
1997	Pie in the Sky	Mrs Truman	Series 5, episode 1
1998	The Bill	Helen Forsyth	Series 14, episodes 20 & 21
1998	The Bill	Magistrate	Series 14, episode 94
2000	The Worst Witch	Mrs Pentangle	Series 3, episode 4
2001	Kavanagh QC	Judge Hanover	Special: "The End of Law"
2001	Midsomer Murders	Miss Marian Leonard	Series 4, episode 3
2001–02	Weirdsister College	Alicia Thunderblast	Series 1 (7 episodes)

Film
Year	Title	Role	Notes
1979	Follow You Follow Me	Peter's Mother	Short
1982	Britannia Hospital	Miss Diamond	
1984	It's Going to Be Alright	Frances Birkett	Television film
1988	The Dawning	Celia Brabazon	
1990	Paper Mask	Radiographer	
1990	The Fool		
1991	A Demon in My View	Aunt Gracie	
1995	P.R.O.B.E.: The Devil of Winterborne	Mrs Barbara Tabole	Direct-to-video film
1996	P.R.O.B.E.: Ghosts of Winterborne	Margaret Wyndham	Direct-to-video film
2000	Highlander: Endgame	Lady	
2001	Bridget Jones's Diary	Mrs Darcy	
