= Shirley Stelfox =

British actress (1941–2015)

- Born: Shirley Rosemary Stelfox; 11 April 1941; Dukinfield, Cheshire, England
- Died: 7 December 2015 (aged 74); Nottinghamshire, England
- Occupation: Actress
- Years active: 1954–2015
- Known for: Emmerdale as Edna Birch; Keeping Up Appearances as Rose
- Spouses: Keith Edmundson (m. 1962; div. 1965) Don Henderson (m. 1979; died 1997)
- Children: 3

Shirley Rosemary Stelfox (11 April 1941 – 7 December 2015) was a British actress, known for her portrayal of the character Edna Birch, a moralising busybody in the ITV soap opera Emmerdale, and as Rose, the vampy sister of the snobby and overbearing Hyacinth Bucket in the first series of the comedy series Keeping Up Appearances.

== Early life ==
Shirley Rosemary Stelfox was born on 11 April 1941 in Dukinfield, Cheshire. She suffered from bilateral amblyopia, which left her short-sighted. While she was still at Lakes Road Secondary School in Dukinfield she appeared in pantomimes at the Old Chapel in the town, and in other productions. She then studied at the Royal Academy of Dramatic Art (RADA), where her classmates included Edward Fox, John Thaw and Sarah Miles.

== Career ==
=== Television ===
After the Royal Academy of Dramatic Art Stelfox started on BBC Television in The Case Before You, a play in which she appeared as a 15 year old arsonist. In December 1960 she appeared in her first episode of Coronation Street. She later played many different characters in the soap opera, including, in 1983, the owner of a dating agency whose customers include the long running character Jack Duckworth (William Tarmey).

She played Hyacinth Bucket's sister Rose in the first series of Keeping Up Appearances, but was replaced by Mary Millar for the rest of the show’s run. She appeared in several other well-known television series, including ‘’Emmerdale’’, Wicked Women (1970), Making Out, Heartbeat, Common as Muck, Juliet Bravo, The Bill, Crossroads, Inspector Morse, Grange Hill and Albion Market. She appeared Brookside as Madge Richmond (1986–1987), and in 1999 she appeared in two episodes of EastEnders as Jane Healy.

Among many other one-off parts, she played Alice Hobson in Hobson’s Choice (1967), Helen in Civvies (1992), Julie Clegg in Three Seven Eleven (1993–1994), Jean in Common as Muck (1994) and Mrs Nolan in Lucy Sullivan is Getting Married (1999–2000). She also played the mother of Julie Walters and Victoria Wood in the TV film Pat and Margaret (1994).

=== Films ===
Her best-known film role was as the "$2.00 Prostitute" in Nineteen Eighty-Four, a film adaptation of George Orwell's novel. She played another prostitute in Terry Jones's comedy Personal Services (1987).

=== Stage ===
On the West End stage Stelfox played Sue Lawson in Not Now, Darling (Strand Theatre, 1968) and Phoebe in Toad of Toad Hall (Duke of York's Theatre, 1970). She starred in Stand Up Sweetie Pie, directed by June Brown, which premiered in 1993 at the Nottingham Playhouse. She played Regan in King Lear at the Ludlow Festival in 1972 and at the Connaught Theatre in Worthing. She also played Lady Macbeth in 1973, Yelena in Uncle Vanya in 1974 and Titania in A Midsummer Night's Dream in 1978.

== Personal life and death ==
Stelfox was married to Keith Edmundson for three years. She had a daughter from this marriage. She married her fellow actor Don Henderson in 1979 and they were together until his death from throat cancer in 1997. They lived in Stratford-upon-Avon, where she helped to bring up Henderson's two children from his first marriage. She moved to Nottinghamshire after Henderson's death.

Stelfox died on 7 December 2015, aged 74, four weeks after she had been diagnosed with terminal cancer.

== Selective filmography ==
Year	Title	Role	Notes
1960, 1964-1994	Coronation Street	Norma / Barmaid / Margot Sutcliffe / Shirley Henderson	10 episodes
1966	Pardon the Expression	Sales Assistant	Episode: "The Dinner Party"
1967	Who Is Sylvia?		Episode: "A Pool of Blood and a Red Carnation"
1968	Corruption	Girl at Party	
1971-1972	Nearest and Dearest	Det. Constable Gloria Simpkins / Clara Wilson	2 episodes
1971	Carry On at Your Convenience	Bunny Girl Waitress	
1972	Budgie	The Barmaid	Episode: "Our Story So Far..."
1973	Pathfinders	Grete	Episode: "Sweets from a Stranger"
1973	Crown Court	Mrs Catherine Barnes	Episode: "Regina v Barnes: Whatever Happened to George Robins?: Part 3"
1980-1983	Juliet Bravo	Mrs Collis / Mavis 'Colette' Newby	2 episodes
1981	Play for Today	Mrs Smith	Episode: "A Brush with Mr Porter on the Road to El Dorado"
1981	The Chinese Detective	Arlene	Episode: "Release"
1983	Grange Hill	Secretary	1 episode
1984	Nineteen Eighty-Four	Prostitute	
1984-1988	Bergerac	Anna Ackerman / Pam Lewis	2 episodes
1984	Bootle Saddles	Rita Henderson	6 episodes
1986–1987	Brookside	Madge Richmond	15 episodes
1987	Knights of God	Beth Edwards	7 episodes
1987	Personal Services	Shirley	
1988	Inspector Morse	Mrs Kane	Episode: "Last Bus to Woodstock"
1989–1991	Making Out	Carol May	24 episodes
1990	Keeping Up Appearances	Rose	6 episodes
1991-1999	The Bill	Mrs Fowler / Gill Gibson / Mrs Larch / Mrs Mitchell	4 episodes
1992	Heartbeat	Mrs Parkin	Episode: "Fruits of the Earth"
1993–1994	Three Seven Eleven	Julie Clegg	16 episodes
1994	Screen One	Vera	Episode: "Pat and Margaret"
1994–1997	Common As Muck	Jean	5 episodes
1995	Harry's Mad	Mrs Turtle	6 episodes
1999–2000	Lucy Sullivan Is Getting Married	Mrs Nolan	16 episodes
1999	EastEnders	Jane Healy	Episode: "New Year's Eve 1999": Part 1 and 2
2000–2015	Emmerdale	Edna Birch	901 episodes (final role)
