= David Griffin (actor) =

English actor (born 1943)

- Born: 19 July 1943 (age 83); Richmond, Surrey, England
- Occupation: Actor
- Years active: 1960–2005
- Notable work: Keeping Up Appearances; Hi-de-Hi!
- Children: 2

David Griffin (born 19 July 1943) is an English retired actor best known for his roles as Squadron Leader Clive Dempster DFC in Hi-de-Hi! (1984–1988) and Emmet Hawksworth in Keeping Up Appearances (1991–1995).

== Career ==
Griffin's first screen role was in 1960 in the film A French Mistress. Roles like Ricketts in The Fifth Form at St. Dominic's in 1961, David Ashton in Outbreak of Murder in 1962 and Mark Dennison in Quick Before They Catch Us in 1966 followed soon after and became both popular and familiar with viewers. Griffin would appear in the smash hit film Battle of Britain in 1969 as Sergeant Pilot Chris and in popular television series including Dixon of Dock Green in 1968 and then again in 1974, Z-Cars in 1970.

Other television appearances include a guest role in an episode of Doctor Who, 'Allo 'Allo!, Dixon of Dock Green, Emmerdale Farm and two episodes of Ripping Yarns. In Keeping Up Appearances he played music director Emmet Hawksworth, neighbour of Hyacinth Bucket, whom he constantly tried to avoid out of fear that she will "sing at him". After finishing Keeping Up Appearances in 1995, he toured worldwide, with Su Pollard, in the stage show The Good Sex Guide. He has also starred in several pantomimes such as Jack and the Beanstalk amongst others. In 2004, Griffin appeared on the Keeping Up Appearances episode of Comedy Connections, discussing his role of Emmet.

== Filmography ==
Year	Title	Role	Notes
1960	A French Mistress	Slater	
1960	ITV Television Playhouse	Member of the Special English Sixth	
1961	The Fifth Form at St. Dominic's	Ricketts	4 episodes
1962	Outbreak of Murder	David Ashton	5 episodes
1966	The Newcomers	Roddy Vaughan	
1966	The Troubleshooters	Greg Harley	Episode: "There's Nothing Like the Great Outdoors"
1966	Quick Before They Catch Us	Mark Dennison	20 episodes
1968	The Blood Beast Terror	William Warrender	
1968	If....	Willens: Seniors	
1968	Dixon of Dock Green	David Newman	Episode: "The White Mercedes"
1968	The Blood Beast Terror	William	
1969	Battle of Britain	Sgt. Pilot Chris	
1969	Softly, Softly	Pullen	Episode: "Recovery"
1969	The Borderers	Simon Lisle	Episode: "Truce"
1970	The Walking Stick	Benjy	
1970	Trog	Malcolm Travers	
1970	The Befrienders	Jack	Television film
1970	Z-Cars	Pearson	Episode: "No Questions Asked: Parts 1&2"
1971	Out of the Unknown	Hamilton White	Episode: "The Sons and Daughters of Tomorrow"
1971	Paul Temple	Executive	Episode: "Catch Your Death"
1971	The Doctors	Brett	2 episodes
1972	Doctor Who	Lt. Commander Mitchell	Episodes: "The Sea Devils" 3, 4, 5
1973	Freewheelers	Dickson	Episode: "Libra"
1973	Ryan	Gordon Moss	Episode: Miss Ogilvie Presents"
1973	The Song of Songs	Robert Horvath	4 episodes
1974	All I Want Is You... and You... and You...	Freddie Millbank	
1974	Dixon of Dock Green	Ray Glenn	Episode: "There's Your Story, There's My Story – And There's the Truth"
1975	Rollerball	Man collecting coats	Uncredited role
1975–1976	Hogg's Back	Dennis Hodge / Stranger	2 episodes
1977	Nicholas Nickleby	Frankie Cheeryble	2 episodes
1977–1979	Ripping Yarns	Captain Meredith / Attenborough	2 episodes
1978–1979	Emmerdale Farm	Steve Ashcroft	3 episodes
1978	BBC2 Play of the Week	Schneider	Episode: "The Copyist"
1978	Send in the Girls	Michael Mawson	Episode: "Chickabiddy"
1979	Shoestring	Brian Kelson	Episode: "The Partnership"
1980	Play for Today	Carl Morgan	Episode: "The Flipside of Dominick Hide"
1980	Breakaway	Arnold Lang	Episode: "The Local Affair: Part 6"
1982	Kelly Monteith		Series 4 episode 6
1982	Squadron	Flt. Lt. Gerald Corbin	Episode: "Memorial Flight"
1983	Privates on Parade	Infantry Officer in the Jungle	
1983	Maybury	Sam	2 episodes
1984–1988	Hi-de-Hi!	Squadron Leader Clive Dempster DFC	24 episodes
1989	Judith Krantz's Till We Meet Again	Capt. Douglas	2 episodes
1989	'Allo 'Allo!	Submarine Commander	Episode: "The Nouvian Oars"
1989	Ticket to Ride	Nate	Pilot
1991–1995	Keeping Up Appearances	Emmet	37 episodes
1994	Keeping Up Appearances TV Licence Promo	Emmet	Television short
1995	Killing Me Softly	Judge	
2005	Julian Fellowes Investigates: A Most Mysterious Murder	Jack Soames	
