= George Webb (actor) =

British actor (1912–1998)

- Webb as 'Daddy' in Keeping Up Appearances
- Born: George Augustus Webb; 6 March 1912; Paddington, London, England
- Died: 30 December 1998 (aged 86); London, England
- Occupation: Actor
- Years active: 1965–1998
- Children: 1
- Relatives: Rita Webb (half-sister)

George Augustus Webb (6 March 1912 – 30 December 1998) was a British actor, best known for television, including his role as "Daddy", the father of snooty Hyacinth Bucket in the sitcom Keeping Up Appearances.

The son of Henry Augustus Webb (1880–1926) and Gertrude (née Bolingbroke), Webb was born at 41 St Luke's Road, Paddington, London. He had two younger siblings, Denis Alfred (1913–1918), who was killed by a military vehicle at age four while picking flowers for his mother; and Joan (1915–1989), who died by suicide after years of ill health.

From his father's earlier marriage, Webb was the half brother of the actors Rita and Harry Webb. Webb died on 30 December 1998, aged 86, from natural causes.

== Filmography ==
Year(s)	Title	Role	Notes
1965	The Wednesday Play	Jim Ritchie	1 episode
1966–70	The Troubleshooters	Henri Vassiere / Police Inspector	2 episodes
1990–1995	Keeping Up Appearances	Daddy or Father	21 episodes
1995	Mr. Bean	Headmaster (uncredited)	1 episode
