= Keeping Up Appearances =

British TV sitcom (1990–1995)

- Genre: Sitcom
- Created by: Roy Clarke
- Written by: Roy Clarke
- Directed by: Harold Snoad
- Starring: Patricia Routledge; Clive Swift; Josephine Tewson; Geoffrey Hughes; Judy Cornwell; Shirley Stelfox; Mary Millar; David Griffin
- Theme music composer: Nick Ingman
- Country of origin: United Kingdom
- Original language: English
- No. of series: 5
- No. of episodes: 44 (list of episodes)

Production
- Producer: Harold Snoad
- Production locations: BBC Television Centre; Binley Woods, Warwickshire, England; (Hyacinth's Home); Stoke Aldermoor, Coventry, West Midlands, England; (Daisy and Onslow's Council Estate House); Leamington Spa, England (Towns and various locations); Northampton, England; (Church, Church Hall and Vicarage); Swindon, Wiltshire, England; Oxford, England; Bristol, England; Great Yarmouth, Norfolk, England; Oslo, Norway; (location scenes)
- Editor: Andy Quested
- Camera setup: Single-camera; Multi-camera
- Running time: 30 minutes 50 minutes (1994 Christmas special); 60 minutes (1993 Christmas special)
- Production company: BBC Television

Original release
- Network: BBC1
- Release: 29 October 1990 – 25 December 1995

Related
- Young Hyacinth

Keeping Up Appearances is a British sitcom created and written by Roy Clarke. It originally aired on BBC1 from 1990 to 1995. The central character is an eccentric and snobbish middle-class social climber, Hyacinth Bucket (née Walton, played by Patricia Routledge), who insists that her surname is pronounced "Bouquet". The show consists of five series and 44 episodes, four of which are Christmas specials. Production ended in 1995 after Routledge decided to move on to other projects. All 44 episodes have since been released on video, DVD and streaming media.

The sitcom follows Hyacinth in her attempts to prove her social superiority, and to gain standing with those she considers upper class. Her attempts are constantly hampered by her lower class background, and extended family, whom she is desperate to hide and distance herself from. Much of the humour comes from the conflict between Hyacinth's vision of herself and the reality of her underclass background. In each episode, she lands in a farcical situation as she battles to protect her social credibility.

Keeping Up Appearances was an immense success in the UK, and also captured large audiences in the United States, Canada, Australia, Denmark, Finland, Sweden, Norway, Ireland, New Zealand, Belgium, and the Netherlands. By February 2016, it had been sold nearly a thousand times to overseas broadcasters, making it BBC Worldwide's most exported television programme ever.

In a 2004 BBC poll it placed 12th in Britain's Best Sitcom. In a 2001 Channel 4 poll, Hyacinth was ranked 52nd on their list of the 100 Greatest TV Characters. The show has been syndicated on Gold and Drama in the UK, on PBS member stations in the US and on 7TWO and 9Gem in Australia.

== Premise ==
Hyacinth Bucket (née Walton) – who insists her surname is pronounced Bouquet (although her husband Richard has said, "It was always 'Bucket' until I met you!") – is an overbearing, social-climbing snob, originally from a lower-class background, whose main mission in life is to impress others with her refinement and pretended affluence.

She is terrified that her background will be revealed and goes to great lengths to hide it. Hyacinth likes to spend her days visiting stately homes (convinced she will meet and strike up a friendship with the upper-class owners, especially if they are part of the landed gentry or peerage) and hosting "executive-style" candlelight suppers (with her Royal Worcester double-glazed Avignon china and Royal Doulton china with "the hand-painted periwinkles").

She ostentatiously brags about her possessions, including her "white slimline telephone with automatic redial", which she always answers with "The Bouquet residence, the lady of the house speaking." She frequently receives misdialled numbers for a Chinese takeaway, angering her, insisting that the takeway change its phone number. She speaks in an exaggerated RP-style accent with northern English undertones, while her relatives speak in broad northern accents. Her neighbours speak in milder RP accents. When flustered, Hyacinth reverts to her native accent.

Hyacinth's attempts to impress makes the lives of those around her difficult; her continual efforts to improve her social position usually involve inviting her unwilling neighbours and friends to "exclusive candlelight suppers". Although Hyacinth is not deterred by the lack of response to her attempts, her friends, neighbours, and acquaintances live in fear of being invited, and usually make frantic attempts to excuse themselves.

Hyacinth's husband Richard (Clive Swift) bears the brunt of the suffering. He initially worked for the council in "Finance and General Purposes", but at the beginning of series three, reluctantly accepts early retirement. Though Hyacinth describes his role as "a power in local authority", he appears to be no more than a bureaucratic functionary. Although he loves her with a long-suffering endurance, he is notably exasperated by her plans and her habit of making extravagant and unnecessary purchases.

Although she lives to impress others, Hyacinth regularly competes with her middle-class neighbours (whom she considers snobbish showoffs) such as Sonja Barker-Finch, Delia Wheelwright and Lydia Hawksworth (who alone of Hyacinth's rivals seems to be an actual snob, as she disdains kiwifruit as "lower middle class"). Hyacinth sometimes says things like "I haven't a snobbish bone in my body" or "I can't abide such snobbery like that" when talking about those she considers her competition.

Hyacinth's working-class sisters Daisy (Judy Cornwell) and Rose (Shirley Stelfox in series one; Mary Millar thereafter), along with Daisy's husband Onslow (Geoffrey Hughes), frequently disrupt Hyacinth's efforts to portray an upper-class image and serve as an unwelcome reminder of her background. They, along with Hyacinth's senile father, frequently turn up inconveniently (usually in their clapped-out Ford Cortina – which always makes a characteristic backfire when it arrives), with Hyacinth going to great lengths to avoid them (saying: "Richard, you know I love my family, but that's no reason why I should have to acknowledge them in broad daylight!"). Rose is very sexually aggressive and promiscuous, adding to Hyacinth's embarrassment. Although Hyacinth is embarrassed by Onslow's laziness and unkempt character, Richard and Onslow get along very well, while Daisy's cheerful nature wins over anyone she meets from Hyacinth's preferred social circle.

Hyacinth's senile father frequently has flashbacks to the Second World War, and often exhibits bizarre behaviour, sometimes involving embarrassing situations with women (Onslow describes him as "barmy"). Two relatives of whom Hyacinth is not ashamed are her sister Violet (Anna Dawson), who is married to the wealthy Bruce, and her unseen son Sheridan. Violet frequently telephones Hyacinth for advice, allowing her to loudly announce to anyone in earshot, "It's my sister Violet – the one with a Mercedes, swimming pool/sauna and room for a pony". However, Violet's social acceptability is damaged by the eccentric behaviour of her cross-dressing, equestrian-loving turf accountant husband Bruce, whom she attacks because of his behaviour.

Hyacinth also tries to impress people with the intellectual prowess of her beloved son Sheridan (who actually only takes a course in needlework at a polytechnic). Hyacinth boasts about the "psychic" closeness of their relationship and how often he writes and telephones her, although he never writes and only telephones his mother to ask for money, much to the despair of Richard. Hyacinth is blissfully oblivious to the seemingly obvious hints that Sheridan, who lives with a man named Tarquin (who makes his own curtains, wears silk pyjamas, and has won prizes for embroidery), is gay, but Richard appears to have realised this, asking Hyacinth if she has ever wondered why Sheridan shows no interest in girls.

Hyacinth's neighbour Elizabeth "Liz" Warden (Josephine Tewson) is frequently invited round for coffee. Though she is ordinarily calm, Elizabeth's nerves go to pieces in Hyacinth's house, causing her to smash Hyacinth's china and spill coffee and biscuits on Hyacinth's Burmese rug or table. She is married with a daughter away at university, yet her husband works abroad and, like Sheridan, neither character ever appears. While everyone else usually addresses her simply as "Liz", Hyacinth almost always calls her by her full name.

Elizabeth is occasionally able to "one-up" Hyacinth herself by reminding her neighbour that her daughter is at university, while Sheridan is studying at a mere polytechnic. Liz's brother Emmet (David Griffin) moves in with her at the beginning of series two, after a messy divorce. Hyacinth, upon learning that Emmet is a musician, frequently and abruptly sings out-of-key at him to try to get a part in one of his productions, making him terrified of leaving the house, lest she see him ("She'll sing at me!"). Emmet's problems are made worse by Hyacinth's mistaken belief that his frightened reactions indicate that he is infatuated with her, which, in fact, could not be further from the truth.

Hyacinth frequently confronts the postman with complaints, harassing him to the point that he will go to extreme lengths not to face her; she often forces workmen and other visitors to her home to remove their shoes before entering. Michael, the vicar of the local church (Jeremy Gittins) is also loath to face the overbearing Hyacinth, to whom he refers (behind her back) as "the Bucket woman". The vicar and his wife sometimes exact comic revenge on Hyacinth for her snobbishness; on one occasion, when she was one of a group of volunteer helpers at the church, the vicar's wife saw to it that Hyacinth's hand went up prematurely and assigned her the job of cleaning the church hall toilets.

== Development ==
Writer Roy Clarke said that he conceived the contrast between the pronunciations "Bucket" and "Bouquet" as a symbol of Hyacinth's social pretentions. He was partly inspired by having encountered people with the surname Bottom who insisted on pronouncing it "Bo-tome"

== Cast ==
The cast in 1991. Standing from left to right, Jeremy Gittins, David Griffin, Judy Cornwell, Geoffrey Hughes, and Mary Millar. Seated from left to right, Clive Swift, Patricia Routledge and Josephine Tewson.

=== Main ===
- Patricia Routledge as Hyacinth Bucket (Series 1–5)
- Clive Swift as Richard Bucket (Series 1–5)
- Josephine Tewson as Elizabeth 'Liz' Warden (Series 1–5)
- Judy Cornwell as Daisy (Series 1–5)
- Geoffrey Hughes as Onslow (Series 1–5)
- Shirley Stelfox as Rose (Series 1)
- Mary Millar as Rose (Series 2–5)
- David Griffin as Emmet Hawksworth (Series 2–5)

=== Recurring ===
- Jeremy Gittins as Michael the Vicar (Series 1–5)
- George Webb as Daddy / Father (Series 1–5)
- Marion Barron as Vicar's Wife (Series 1–5)
- Peter Cellier as Major Wilton Smythe (Series 1–2)
- Leo Dolan as Michael the Postman (Series 1)
- David Janson as Michael the Postman (Series 3–5)
- Robert Rawles as Milkman (Series 1–5)
- Anna Dawson as Violet (Series 5)
- Charmian May as Councillor Mrs Nugent (Series 1–3)
- John Evitts as Bruce (Series 5)

== Episodes ==
Keeping Up Appearances aired for five series, four Christmas specials, and one short Children in Need special from 29 October 1990 to 25 December 1995. The series officially ended after the episode "The Pageant", because Patricia Routledge wanted to focus on other TV and theatre work, including Hetty Wainthropp Investigates, which began airing in 1996. Clive Swift, who portrayed Richard, stated in a BBC interview that Routledge "didn't want to be remembered as simply 'Mrs. Bucket'". Despite the series' ongoing popularity, she wished to pursue other roles as an actress. In a 2017 interview, Routledge said: "I always thought of the great, great Ronnie Barker. He always left something when he was on a high, and it's much better to have people say now 'Oh, why didn't you do some more?' than having them say 'Oh, is that still on?'" Another reason she wished to leave the role was that she felt that the writer Roy Clarke was "recycling some old ideas that we'd already dealt with".

Series
Series	Episodes	Originally released	
Series	Episodes	First released	Last released
1	6	29 October 1990	3 December 1990
2	10	1 September 1991	3 November 1991
Special		25 December 1991	
3	7	6 September 1992	18 October 1992
4	7	5 September 1993	17 October 1993
Special		26 December 1993	
Special		25 December 1994	
5	10	3 September 1995	5 November 1995
Special		25 December 1995	

== Production ==
=== Locations ===
The opening sequence shows Hyacinth writing an invitation to one of her trademark candlelight suppers; this invitation lists Hyacinth's address as "Waney Elm, Blossom Avenue, Fuddleton". In the same sequence, the invitation is eventually sent to an address in Eddleton.

== Legacy ==
Various spin-off shows and specials related to the programme were broadcast.

=== Mr Blobby Meets Hyacinth Bucket ===
In 1993, a short sketch aired during an episode of Noel's House Party. The clip featuring Mr Blobby saw the character causing havoc in Hyacinth's home. This clip was also featured in the "Blobbyvision" VHS release in 1994.

=== Daddy's Dead (Children in Need special) ===
In 1995, a special six-minute sketch was broadcast as part of Children in Need. Hyacinth dreams Daddy has died, and demands the coffin be brought to her house.

=== The Memoirs of Hyacinth Bucket ===
In 1996, BBC Worldwide Americas approached Harold Snoad about writing and producing a one-off special compilation episode. Snoad was tasked with reviewing all 44 episodes, choosing suitable clips and making notes for relatable dialogue for a script. Geoffrey Hughes and Judy Cornwell reprised their roles as Onslow and Daisy respectively.

The plot centred around Daisy and Onslow finding Hyacinth's personal diary which was accidentally left with Daisy by Hyacinth with some other belongings she had lent to her sister. The show sees the pair introducing clips from the series using the diary. It was first broadcast in March 1997 in the United States, with later reruns on PBS. The special was also released on VHS and DVD.

=== Comedy Connections ===
In 2004, the documentary series Comedy Connections featured an episode dedicated to Keeping Up Appearances. Stars Clive Swift, Josephine Tewson, Judy Cornwell and David Griffin, along with writer Roy Clarke and producer/director Harold Snoad, all discussed the series. Clips from an interview with Patricia Routledge from 2002 were also included.

The episode revealed that there were serious artistic differences between Clarke and Snoad. Specifically, Clarke refused to act as anything but a writer and rarely visited the set or location shoots, necessitating that Snoad make minor rewrites to accommodate the realities of taping. This infuriated Clarke, who disliked any tampering of his work, and Snoad thought Clarke was being unreasonable. The situation was mitigated in later series by the hiring of a script editor whose sole job was to keep Clarke apprised of Snoad's changes, and to keep Snoad informed of Clarke's opinion of them.

=== Life Lessons from Onslow ===
In early 2008, Geoffrey Hughes reprised his role as Onslow once again for a clipshow of the series; this was for broadcast on American television and sees him teaching a credit course at the Open University having selected "successful relationships" as his subject matter. The programme was also released on Region 1 DVD.

=== Mind Your Manors ===
When Keeping Up Appearances did not return, after Patricia Routledge announced that she no longer wished to play Hyacinth, Roy Clarke proposed a spin-off series called Mind Your Manors. The series was referenced in BBC in-house literature during 1997 and 1998 and later described by both Clarke and Geoffrey Hughes as part of a discussion of the character of Onslow in Radio 4's Archive on 4: On Northern Men, broadcast in 2009.

The spin-off would have seen Onslow forced to take a supposedly "easy" job tending the gardens of a large manor house estate owned by a doddery and rather forgetful old Lord. When the Lord dies suddenly, Onslow, Daisy and Rose (who it is implied was having a fling with the Lord, causing the heart attack which led to his death) end up "temporarily" moving into the manor house to mind it, due to a legal dispute with the deceased Lord's estranged brother (whom Rose immediately starts lusting after), who wants the land.

A mislaid deeds paper left by the forgetful old Lord would supposedly clarify who has rights to the estate, buried somewhere in the gardens that Onslow is left to ineptly try and keep in shape. Most of the conflict would have come from the Lord's brother and the manor's snooty neighbours, the wealthy Hyde-Whytes, who are not happy about the "commoners" who have taken up residence next door (although it later transpires that Mr. Hyde-Whyte used to know Onslow in their youth and is indebted to him after Onslow once took the fall for him to stop his arrest). Su Pollard was approached to play the role of Miss Dorothy "Dotty" Henshaw, the Lord's eccentric and easily flustered cook-housekeeper who remains with the estate; character actor Timothy Bateson was considered to play the role of Harry, landlord of the local Bull and Bush pub whom would act as a sounding board for Onslow, and some preliminary location shooting was reportedly undertaken.

The proposed spin-off series was ultimately not commissioned, primarily due to the fact that, with Keeping Up Appearances by then proving to be BBC Worldwide's most popular export, the BBC were still keen to entice Routledge back for either a new series or for one-off Specials, and so did not wish to upset the existing series continuity by relocating Onslow and co. to a new setting.

=== Comedy Classics: Keeping Up Appearances – 30 Years of Laughs ===
In January 2023, Channel 5 aired a 67-minute special retrospective for their "Comedy Classics" series. Cast, crew and celebrities pay tribute to the show. The documentary features an interview with Routledge, who was 93 at the time, sharing her memories of the show, along with supporting cast members Judy Cornwell, Jeremy Gittins, and David Janson.

=== Roy Clarke...Remembers Keeping Up Appearances ===
In July 2024, BBC Four aired a 15-minute special interview with the sitcom's writer and creator Roy Clarke.

=== Dame Patricia Routledge...Remembers Keeping Up Appearances ===
On 3 September 2024, BBC Four aired a second retrospective 15-minute special interview with Patricia Routledge. In the short documentary, Routledge recalled how the character of Hyacinth Bucket entered her life, how she was cast in the role as one of television's most formidable comedy characters. Routledge also explained her found pleasures of working with her fellow cast members. Routledge shared her thoughts of why the character of Richard Bucket endured many years of his marriage with Hyacinth. Routledge explains why – despite her fondness for every element of the sitcom, that it was her own personal decision, to call time on the show, when the BBC and all of the other cast and crew members would have loved for it to have continued.

== Merchandise ==
=== Audio ===
In 1998, the BBC released three episodes of the show: "Hyacinth Tees Off", "Rural Retreat", and "Sea Fever" on audio cassette. Clive Swift reprised his role as Richard, recording a narrative to compensate for the lack of images.

=== VHS ===
BBC Video released three videos featuring episodes from the series.

- How to Enhance Your Husband's Retirement

This was released in 1993 and featured the episodes: "Iron Age Remains", "What to Wear when Yachting" and "How to Go on Holiday Without Really Trying".

- Sea Fever

This was released in 1994 and featured the episodes: "Sea Fever" and "A Job for Richard".

- Rural Retreat

This was released in 1995 and featured the episodes: "Country Retreat", "Let There Be Light" and "Please Mind Your Head".

Universal Pictures released two video boxsets featuring all episodes from the first four series.

- Series One and Two was released as a VHS PAL three video cassette tape boxset on 17 March 2003.
- Series Three and Four and the 1991 Christmas special was released as a VHS PAL three video cassette tape boxset on 16 February 2004.

=== DVD ===
Region 1 DVD overview
DVD title	Series	Release date	Features
Volume 1: My Way or the Hyacinth Way	Series 1 (all 6 episodes)	18 March 2003	Special features: Outtakes; Cast Bios
Volume 2: Hints from Hyacinth	Series 2 (episodes 1–5)	18 March 2003	Special features: Outtakes; Cast Bios
Volume 3: Home is Where the Hyacinth Is	Series 2 (episodes 6–10)	18 March 2003	Special features: "Funny Women", profile of Patricia Routledge; Outtakes; Cast Bios
Volume 4: Deck the Halls with Hyacinth	All 4 Christmas specials	18 March 2003	Special features: The Kitty Monologues; Cast Bios
Hyacinth in Full Bloom (Volumes 1–4)	Series 1–2 & all specials	18 March 2003	see individual releases for special features
Volume 5: Everything's Coming Up Hyacinth	Series 3 (all 7 episodes)	3 February 2004	Special features: Outtakes; Cast Bios
Volume 6: Some Like It Hyacinth	Series 4 (all 7 episodes)	3 February 2004	Special features: Second Chance Shorts: Exclusive UK commercial featuring Hyacinth and Elizabeth; Outtakes; Cast Bios
Volume 7: Living the Hyacinth Life	Series 5 (episodes 1–5)	3 February 2004	Special features: Pebble Mill interview with Patricia Routledge and Clive Swift; Outtakes; Cast Bios
Volume 8: Hats Off to Hyacinth	Series 5 (episodes 6–10)	3 February 2004	Special features: "The Memoirs of Hyacinth Bucket"; Outtakes; Cast Bios
Hyacinth Springs Eternal (Volumes 5–8)	Series 3–5	3 February 2004	see individual releases for special features
The Full Bouquet (Volumes 1–8)	Series 1–5 & all specials	7 September 2004	see individual releases for special features
Life Lessons from Onslow	(Non-episode video special)	9 September 2008	Special features: Interview with Geoffrey Hughes
The Full Bouquet: Special Edition (Volumes 1–8)	Series 1–5 & all specials	9 September 2008	Includes all special features from previous sets, with the inclusion of the exclusive video special "Life Lessons from Onslow"
Collector's Edition	Series 1–5 & all specials	5 November 2013	Special features: Hyacinth Revealed – Newly recorded interviews with Patricia Routledge, Roy Clarke and others!; Outtakes; "Funny Women", profile of Patricia Routledge; The Kitty Monologues; Second Chance Shorts: Exclusive UK commercial featuring Hyacinth and Elizabeth; Pebble Mill interview with Patricia Routledge and Clive Swift; "The Memoirs of Hyacinth Bucket"; Interviews with Patricia Routledge and Judy Cornwell; Comedy Connections – Keeping Up Appearances; "Life Lessons from Onslow"

Region 2 DVD overview
DVD title	Episodes	No. of discs	Release date	BBFC rating	Features
Series 1 & 2	16	3	17 March 2003	PG	Special features: None
Series 3 & 4	15	3	16 February 2004	PG	Includes 1991 Christmas Special; Special features: None
Series 5	13	2	26 December 2006	PG	Includes 1993, 1994 and 1995 Christmas specials; Special features: None
The Essential Collection	44	8	8 October 2007	PG	Includes 1991, 1993, 1994 and 1995 Christmas specials; Special features: None
The Essential Collection (slimline packaging)	44	8	23 September 2013	PG	Contains all 44 episodes (including the four Christmas specials) although the cover states that it contains only 40.; Includes 1991, 1993, 1994 and 1995 Christmas specials; Special features: None
Christmas Specials	4	1	3 November 2014	PG	Includes 1991, 1993, 1994 and 1995 Christmas specials; Special features: None
The Complete Collection (HMV Exclusive)	44	8	22 January 2018	PG	Contains all 44 episodes (including the four Christmas specials) although the cover states that it contains only 40.; Includes 1991, 1993, 1994 and 1995 Christmas specials; Special features: None
The Complete Collection	44	8	28 November 2022	PG	Contains all 44 episodes (including the four Christmas specials) although the cover states that it contains only 40.; Includes 1991, 1993, 1994 and 1995 Christmas specials; Special features: None

Region 4 DVD overview
DVD title	Episodes	No. of discs	Release date	ACB rating	Features
The Complete Series 1 & 2	16	3	1 September 2003	PG	Special features: None
The Complete Series 3 & 4	15	3	8 July 2004	PG	Includes 1991 Christmas Special; Special features: None
The Complete Series 5	13	2	3 November 2005	PG	Includes 1993, 1994 and 1995 Christmas specials; Special features: "The Memoirs of Hyacinth Bucket" Featurette; Interview with Patricia Routledge and Clive Swift; Outtakes; Hyacinth's Social Register; Hyacinth's Guest Book
The Complete Collection	44	9	1 October 2005	PG	Includes 1991, 1993, 1994 and 1995 Christmas specials; Special features: see "Series 5" DVD
Christmas Specials	4	1	11 November 2005	PG	Includes 1991, 1993, 1994 and 1995 Christmas specials; Special features: None
Life Lessons from Onslow	—N/a	1	15 April 2010	PG	Special features: "Comedy Connections" "Keeping Up Appearances"; Interviews with Patricia Routledge and Judy Cornwell; Outtakes
The Full Bouquet	44	10	3 November 2011	PG	Special features: "The Memoirs of Hyacinth Bucket"; Interview with Patricia Routledge and Clive Swift; Outtakes; Hyacinth's Social Register; Hyacinth's Guest Book; Comedy Connections – Keeping Up Appearances; Interviews with Patricia Routledge and Judy Cornwell; "Life Lessons from Onslow"; "Comedy Connections" "Keeping Up Appearances"
The Complete Collection (UK packaging)	44	8	21 February 2024	PG	Same packaging as UK 2022 edition; Special features: TBA

=== Streaming ===
In the United States, the complete series was available via streaming through Netflix and Amazon Video. It was also made available for streaming on BritBox.

In Australia the complete series was made available for streaming on Stan in 2018.

In 2022, in the United Kingdom, the entire series was made available on the BBC iPlayer.

=== Books ===
Three books related to the series have been released in the UK. Two were written by Jonathan Rice and published by BBC Books and the other one was written by Harold Snoad (the director of Keeping Up Appearances) and was published by Book Guild Publishing.

- Hyacinth Bucket's book of etiquette for the socially less fortunate

This was first published in 1993, and is a light-hearted guide to manners, as seen through Hyacinth Bucket's eyes. It is based on the TV series' scripts and contains many black-and-white photos of scenes from the show.

- Hyacinth Bucket's Hectic Social Calendar

This was published in 1995 and is presented in a diary format, chronicling a year in Hyacinth Bucket's life, with typical comments about her relations and neighbours.

- It's Bouquet – Not Bucket

Published in late 2009, the book includes rare photos which were taken during the filming of Keeping Up Appearances. It features full plot synopses for all episodes, main cast details, filming locations for all episodes which used outside shots, and stories of some entertaining events which happened during filming.

==== Overseas books ====
Due to the popularity of Keeping Up Appearances in the United States, books about the series have also been published across the Atlantic.

- Keeping Up Appearances: A Companion to the Series

This comical series guidebook was published in the late 1990s by WLIW21. It was co-authored by mother-and-daughter writers Georgene and Mary Lee Costa. It features summary descriptions of each episode, cast and crew biographies, series photographs and an interview with Harold Snoad.

Since it was written during the filming of the final series of episodes, Snoad included the co-authors of the guide as extras in the episode "The Fancy Dress Ball".

== Theatre adaptation ==
In 2010, the television show was adapted into a play entitled Keeping Up Appearances that toured theatres in the UK. The cast included Rachel Bell as Hyacinth, Kim Hartman as Elizabeth, Gareth Hale as Onslow, Steven Pinder as Emmet, Debbie Arnold as Rose, David Janson (who had previously appeared in the TV show as the postman) as Mr Edward Milson, a new character created for the stage show, Christine Moore as Daisy and Sarah Whitlock as Mrs Debden.

Main character Richard Bucket, Hyacinth's husband, does not appear in the production, but is frequently referred to: Hyacinth addresses him off stage and talks to him on the phone. The main plot of the show revolves around Emmet directing a play at the local village hall, but when Hyacinth is cast in the play's leading role, disaster is in the making.

This adaptation, directed by playwright Johnny Culver, made its American premiere in New York City in March 2015, at the Fifth Avenue Presbyterian Church Theater Fellowship/Jones Auditorium. Culver directed an additional production of this adaptation with performances on 5 August 2017 and 6 August 2017 at Saint Luke's Episcopal Church in Forest Hills, Queens.

== Prequel ==
In 2015, it was announced that a prequel to the series entitled Young Hyacinth would be made, with original writer Roy Clarke returning to pen the script, following a 19-year-old Hyacinth Bucket during the early postwar years and set some forty years before the events of Keeping Up Appearances. The cast were announced on 11 April 2016. Hyacinth was played by Kerry Howard; Rose by Katie Redford; Daisy by Katherine Pearce; Violet by Tamla Kari and Daddy by Mark Addy. It was broadcast on BBC One on 2 September 2016.

The prequel sees Hyacinth working as a maid and attempting to manage her family, so they appear well above their means. In the special, Hyacinth is in a relationship with a Mr. William Hitchcock, whom Hyacinth forces to dress up and wear a hat when they walk. The special ends with her drunken Daddy falling into the canal, which Hyacinth's employers see, causing her great embarrassment. However, she blames Daddy's behaviour on "an old war injury".

Approximately 4.14 million viewers watched the show within seven days of its broadcast, making it the 22nd-most-watched BBC One show for the week ending 4 September. A total of 4.39 million viewers watched the show within 28 days of its initial broadcast.

== See also ==
- British sitcom
