= Making Out (TV series) =

British television series (1989–1991)

- Genre: Comedy drama
- Created by: Franc Roddam
- Written by: Debbie Horsfield
- Starring: Margi Clarke; Melanie Kilburn; Shirley Stelfox
- Theme music composer: New Order
- Opening theme: Vanishing Point
- Country of origin: United Kingdom
- Original language: English
- No. of series: 3
- No. of episodes: 24

Production
- Executive producer: Franc Roddam
- Producers: Michelle Mendoza; John Chapman
- Editor: Nigel Cattle
- Camera setup: Alf Tramontin
- Running time: 1:00:00

Original release
- Network: BBC1
- Release: 6 January 1989 – 12 November 1991

Making Out is a British comedy drama series, shown on BBC1 between 6 January 1989 and 12 November 1991. The series was created by Franc Roddam, written by Debbie Horsfield, and stars Margi Clarke, Melanie Kilburn and Shirley Stelfox.

The music for the series was composed by New Order and The Other Two. The main theme for the show is an adaptation of the song "Vanishing Point".

The series was well-received, and writer Debbie Horsfield was praised for the female characters and their gritty humour. Television critic Nancy Banks-Smith described it as "Coronation Street on speed". BFI Screenonline described it as the "most obvious predecessor" to Clocking Off, a similar drama series set in Manchester.

On 14 September 2023, the entire series was made available on BBC iPlayer.

== Premise ==
The series is set on the factory floor of New Lyne Electronics in Manchester, focusing on the chaotic personal lives of the women who work there. Whilst the show is driven by sharp, northern humour, it frequently tackles serious social themes relevant to the late 1980s and early 1990s, including recession, redundancy, and industrial disputes.

Unlike many workplace comedies of the era, Making Out was serialised, with ongoing plotlines concerning the factory's precarious financial state. The women constantly face the threat of the factory closing or being taken over, which forces them to fight, often unconventionally, to keep their jobs.

== Episodes ==
=== Series 1 ===
Broadcast Friday evenings on BBC1 at 9:30pm.

No. overall	No. in series	Title	Directed by	Written by	Original release date
1	1	"Episode One"	Chris Bernard	Debbie Horsfield	6 January 1989
Who's going to bring the money in? Jill has a young family to feed and an unemployed husband. So she is off to work for the first time and earning her spurs among the girls at Lyne Electronics.
2	2	"Episode Two"	Chris Bernard	Debbie Horsfield	13 January 1989
Who's getting the push and what's Pauline got to hide?
3	3	"Episode Three"	Chris Bernard	Debbie Horsfield	20 January 1989
Who's behind the new order? When mysterious men from the East arrive, the games have got to stop and the pressure is on at work and at home for the girls at Lyne Electronics.
4	4	"Episode Four"	Chris Bernard	Debbie Horsfield	27 January 1989
Who's turned up from the other side of the world unannounced?
5	5	"Episode Five"	Richard Spence	Debbie Horsfield	3 February 1989
Modern management techniques hit Lyne Electronics with unexpected consequences for Klepto and Simon.
6	6	"Episode Six"	Richard Spence	Debbie Horsfield	10 February 1989
What do you get for a pair of brass cupids and 500 pounds in Your Auntie Jessie's will?
7	7	"Episode Seven"	Richard Spence	Debbie Horsfield	17 February 1989
Who's going to make the factory run like clockwork from top to bottom? Dawdlers and skivers had better watch out when Bella Grout is around. The dice are down for the girls at Lyne Electronics.
8	8	"Episode Eight"	Richard Spence	Debbie Horsfield	24 February 1989
Will Rex finally leave Stella, who's Ray's new girlfriend and what will happen if the Koreans pull out now? Orders from top office threaten chaos for everybody at Lyne Electronics.

=== Series 2 ===
Broadcast Tuesday evenings on BBC1 at 9:30pm

No. overall	No. in series	Title	Directed by	Written by	Original release date
9	1	"Episode One"	Carol Wilks	Debbie Horsfield	6 March 1990
How is Rex going to pay the bills when there's no money in the bank? Dodgy solvent has unexpected consequences for Donna and the girls.
10	2	"Episode Two"	Carol Wilks	Debbie Horsfield	13 March 1990
The VAT man cometh. Rex and Chunky get their collars felt leaving Queenie and the rest of the girls at New Lyne Electronics in the lurch.
11	3	"Episode Three"	Carol Wilks	Debbie Horsfield	20 March 1990
What do you say to your late husband's mistress? Stella faces Carol May.
12	4	"Episode Four"	Susan Rogers	Debbie Horsfield	27 March 1990
Donna's put home and baby first while Jill tries to leave her past behind.
13	5	"Episode Five"	Susan Rogers	Debbie Horsfield	3 April 1990
Trouble at home for Pauline and Carol May.
14	6	"Episode Six"	Susan Rogers	Debbie Horsfield	10 April 1990
If it's not last night's Vindaloo, what's giving Queenie a belly ache?
15	7	"Episode Seven"	Noella Smith	Debbie Horsfield	17 April 1990
What are Klepto and Simon doing on a scouts' outing to Blackpool? Strange encounters at the seaside for the girls of New Lyne Electronics.
16	8	"Episode Eight"	Noella Smith	Debbie Horsfield	24 April 1990
Will she or won't she? Jill has to make up her mind, while Bernie and the girls try to scupper Norma's best laid plans.

=== Series 3 ===
Broadcast Tuesday evenings on BBC1 at 9:30pm

No. overall	No. in series	Title	Directed by	Written by	Original release date
17	1	"Episode One"	John Woods	Debbie Horsfield	24 September 1991
Gutsy Queenie and the girls of New Lyne Electronics are back in the third series of the comedy drama written by Debbie Horsfield. This time the comedy is somewhat blacker as the factory and its volatile workers continue to lurch from crisis to crisis. Once again the women lead the drama. Klepto prepares to exchange factory life for that of a student at Newcastle University. Will Jill marry her young Manchester United footballer? Whatever will the eight-month-pregnant Queenie make of motherhood? Can Carol May put her marriage together? The men - whether they're husbands, lovers or bosses - are nothing but bother.
18	2	"Episode Two"	John Woods	Debbie Horsfield	1 October 1991
Queenie and Rosie prepare for motherhood. But is the hospital prepared for Queenie?
19	3	"Episode Three"	John Woods	Debbie Horsfield	8 October 1991
Pauline is underwhelmed by Frankie's over-enthusiastic seduction techniques.
20	4	"Episode Four"	Tom Cotter	Debbie Horsfield	15 October 1991
Carol May's husband Colin switches obsessions from fish to dance in one pirouette while a handsome young stranger arrives on Queenie's doorstep.
21	5	"Episode Five"	Tom Cotter	Debbie Horsfield	22 October 1991
What with one thing and another it's amazing that New Lyne produce any electronics at all. A creche is set up on the factory floor, and Klepto, back from university doing a holiday job, cheers the place up with a mural painting and discovers a hidden talent.
22	6	"Episode Six"	Tom Cotter	Debbie Horsfield	29 October 1991
A night out at the working-men's club is a tonic for Pauline and gives Queenie the chance to display her talents.
23	7	"Episode Seven"	Alister Hallum	Debbie Horsfield	5 November 1991
When Chunky's mate Kip persuades the girls to invest in a racehorse, Queenie finds herself in for a bumpy ride.
24	8	"Episode Eight"	Bren Simson	Debbie Horsfield	12 November 1991
Spangles, sequins and fancy footwork abound as the factory workforce takes part in a local Latin-American dance competition. But amid the glitz it's decision time as Queenie faces up to her past and Pauline looks to her future. Featuring Tommy Docherty as himself.

== Cast ==
=== The girls ===
- Queenie (Margi Clarke), the fiery Scouse ring-leader of the women.
- Pauline (Rachel Davies), the union shop steward for the women.
- Jill (Melanie Kilburn), a new girl at the factory who starts work in the first episode.
- Donna (Heather Tobias), a middle-class woman who is desperate for a baby with her husband.
- Ariadne, known as "Klepto" (Moya Brady), a young woman bullied by her Greek Orthodox family.
- Carol May (Shirley Stelfox)

=== The factory ===
- Rex (Keith Allen), a randy boss at the factory who is having an affair with Carol May.
- Norma (Tracie Bennett), an ambitious, efficient company secretary.
- Bernie (Alan David), a supervisor of the women on the shop floor.
- Simon (Gary Beadle), the only man on the floor, romantically attached to "Klepto".

=== The blokes ===
- Chunky (Brian Hibbard), Queenie's no-good petty criminal husband.
- Ray (Tim Dantay), Jill's husband who eventually leaves her and their kids for another woman, a dimwitted hairdresser called Rosie (Jane Hazlegrove).
- Frankie (John Forgeham), Pauline's husband.
- Colin (David Hargreaves), Carol May's husband.
- Gavin (John Lynch), a footballer with whom Jill starts a relationship after her husband walks out on her.
- Gordon (Jonathan Barlow), Donna's Building Society manager husband.

== See also ==
- Clocking Off (2000–2003)
