= Hyacinth Bucket =

Fictional character in British sitcom

- Keeping Up Appearances character
- Patricia Routledge as Hyacinth Bucket in Keeping Up Appearances
- Portrayed by: Patricia Routledge in Keeping Up Appearances; Kerry Howard in Young Hyacinth
- Duration: 1990–1995, 2016
- First appearance: "Daddy's Accident" (29 October 1990)
- Last appearance: Young Hyacinth (2 September 2016)
- Created by: Roy Clarke
- Introduced by: Harold Snoad
In-universe information
- Occupation: Housewife
- Father: "Daddy"
- Sisters: Daisy; Rose Walton; Violet
- Husband: Richard Bucket
- Sons: Sheridan Bucket
- Nieces: Stephanie

Hyacinth Bucket (née Walton; sometimes known as "The Bucket Woman") is a fictional character in the BBC sitcom Keeping Up Appearances, and one of the main characters of its spinoff special, Young Hyacinth. She is portrayed by Patricia Routledge in Keeping Up Appearances and Kerry Howard in Young Hyacinth. Routledge won a British Comedy Award in 1991 and was nominated for two BAFTA awards in 1992 and 1993 for her portrayal.

== Character synopsis ==
Hyacinth is a social-climbing snob who constantly aims to impress people, particularly of the upper and upper-middle classes, and to give the impression that she is of high social standing, despite her modest status. This is epitomised in her insistence on pronouncing her surname as "Bouquet". She has an "acquired cultured accent which buckles under stress".

The character's creator, Roy Clarke, has called her the "least invented of all the characters I've found in my head":

So I knew my Hyacinths and I knew I had to write my own. They fascinated me. They were hilarious in their pretensions, so marvellously unaware of the real impressions they were making, and yet somehow so up front in their crusade to be superior that it was brave.

Hyacinth is married to Richard Bucket (who pronounces the name as "bucket"), and they live at 22 Blossom Avenue, in a bungalow which Hyacinth refers to as "The Residence" when sending letters. In an attempt to make callers think she is wealthy enough to employ domestic staff, she repeatedly answers the telephone with, "The Bouquet residence; the lady of the house speaking." This false accent had previously been used for Edie Pegden in Last of the Summer Wine, another series written by Clarke.

As revealed in Season 1 Episode 4 "The Charity Shop", Hyacinth is the eldest of the four floral-named Walton sisters: in birth order, Hyacinth, Daisy, Violet, and Rose.

Hyacinth's social class has been the subject of much discussion. Renée Dickason suggests that "Hyacinth Bucket is lower-middle class and thus close in status to the viewing audience", while Paul Roscoe argues that:

With each episode, Hyacinth struggles to transcend the trappings of her lower-class status and relations, only to be brought low and her pretensions to middle-class status ridiculed. For the show's middle- and upper-middle-class audience, the comedic pivot is the many ways and multiple occasions that Hyacinth is slapped down for failing to recognize her position in the status hierarchy.

Dickason concludes that Hyacinth is a "relatively rare example of a wholly unsympathetic weak Britcom character that the audience can only delight in laughing at and not with".

== Appearances in other media ==
In 1991, Hyacinth appeared in a skit for Comic Relief, where Mr Blobby visits the Bucket Residence. Throughout 1993, Routledge also appeared as Hyacinth in a number of television advertisements for British Gas.
