= Judy Cornwell =

English actress (born 1940)

- Born: Judy Valerie Cornwell; 22 February 1940 (age 86); Hammersmith, London, England
- Occupation: Actress
- Years active: 1959–present
- Notable work: Keeping Up Appearances
- Spouse: John Kelsall Parry (m. 1960)
- Children: 1

Judy Valerie Cornwell (born 22 February 1940) is an English actress. She is best known for her role as Daisy in the British sitcom Keeping Up Appearances (1990–1995). She also played Anya Claus in Santa Claus: The Movie (1985). In her later years she became known for playing Miss Marple in many stage productions, including A Murder is Announced between 2015 and 2016.

== Biography ==
Cornwell's father served in the RAF and she grew up in Britain, where she attended a convent school, with Penelope Keith. She attended Lewes County Grammar School for Girls. She later attended Saint Michael Boarding school in Heacham, Norfolk, before moving to Australia with her family. She has written about her childhood experiences in her autobiography Adventures of a Jelly Baby. She later returned to Britain and became a professional dancer and comedian in her teens, working her act between the nudes at Dhurjati Chaudhury's Irving Theatre Club, on Irving Street, off Leicester Square, London, before becoming an actress. Her career includes roles in radio's The Navy Lark, the play Oh! What A Lovely War, her own TV comedy series Moody and Pegg, and a season with the Royal Shakespeare Company.

== Films and television ==
Cornwell's film roles include Santa Claus: The Movie (as Anya Claus) and Mad Cows. On television she has appeared in Dixon of Dock Green, Cakes and Ale, Bergerac, Doctor Who (the serial Paradise Towers), several episodes of Farrington of the F.O., The Famous Five, The Bill, Heartbeat, The Royal, Miss Marple, Midsomer Murders and The Devil's Lieutenant. Cornwell also appeared in BBC soap opera EastEnders as Queenie Trott, the mean tyrant mother of lovable loser Heather Trott. In 1987, she appeared as the English spinster Rosemary Tuttle in the episode "Rumpole and the Official Secret" from Season 4 of Rumpole of the Bailey.

Cornwell is best known, however, for her portrayal of lovable working-class housewife Daisy in the sitcom Keeping Up Appearances, which ran for five series from 1990 to 1995.

Cornwell also appeared in an episode of Birds of a Feather in 2014.

== Published works ==
Cornwell's books include her autobiography Adventures of a Jelly Baby (ISBN 0-283-07001-3) published in 2005 which describes her childhood growing up in Britain during the war, and then in Australia where her family emigrated.

Cornwell has also published several novels, including Cow and Cow Parsley in 1985, Fishcakes at the Ritz in 1989, The Seventh Sunrise in 1994, and Fear and Favour in 1996.

== Personal life ==
Cornwell married John Kelsall Parry on 18 December 1960 and they have one son together. The couple resides in Brighton. There, Parry was a reporter for The Argus.

== Filmography ==
=== Film ===
Film roles
Year	Title	Role	Notes
1959	Friends and Neighbours	4th Girl	
1965	Dr. Terror's House of Horrors	Nurse	(segment Disembodied Hand), uncredited
1967	Two for the Road	Pat	
1967	Jules Verne's Rocket to the Moon	Lady Electra	
1968	The Wild Racers	Pippy	
1969	Can Heironymus Merkin Ever Forget Mercy Humppe and Find True Happiness?	Filigree Fondle	
1969	Cry Wolf	Stella	
1970	Every Home Should Have One	Liz Brown	
1970	Country Dance	Rosie	
1970	Paddy	Breeda	
1970	Wuthering Heights	Nelly Dean	
1971	Whoever Slew Auntie Roo?	Clarine	
1985	Santa Claus: The Movie	Anya Claus	
1987	Cry Freedom	Receptionist	
1995	Persuasion	Mrs Musgrove	
1999	Mad Cows	Maddy's Mother	

=== Television ===
Television roles
Year	Title	Role	Notes
1964	The Sullavan Brothers	Helen	1 episode
1965	The Worker	Mary	1 episode
1972	Man of Straw	Guste Daimchen	4 episodes
1974–1976	Moody and Pegg	Daphne Pegg	12 episodes
1976	Cakes and Ale	Rosie	3 episodes
1977	Supernatural	Margaret Graham	Episode: Viktoria
1980–1981	The Good Companions	Elizabeth Trant	9 episodes
1982	Look and Read	Mrs Watson	Episode: Fairground
1983	Jane Eyre	Mrs Reed	2 episodes
1983	Rumpole of the Bailey	Miss Tuttle	Season 4 Episode 3
1983	Good Behaviour	Mrs Brock	1 episode
1984	The Devil's Lieutenant	Rose von Siebert	TV film
1985	There Comes a Time	Vanessa James	7 episodes
1987	Doctor Who	Maddy	3 episodes: Paradise Towers
1987	Dorothy L. Sayers Mysteries	Miss Booth	Episode: Strong Poison
1987	Bergerac	Belle Young	Episode: The Memory Man
1990–1995	Keeping Up Appearances	Daisy	Main role; 44 episodes
1992	Nice Town	Aunt Peggy	3 episodes
1992	The Mirror Crack'd	Heather Badcock	TV film
1994	Under the Hammer	'Batty'	1 episode
1996	Famous Five	Mrs Baker	Episode: Five on a Hike Together
1997	The Memoirs of Hyacinth Bucket	Daisy	TV film
1998	Midsomer Murders	May Cuttle	Episode: Death in Disguise
1998	The Life and Crimes of William Palmer	Mrs Palmer	2 episodes
1999	Heartbeat	Isabelle Sheba Christie	Episode: Shotgun Wedding
2000	David Copperfield	Peggotty	TV film
2005, 2009, 2011, 2013	Doctors	Lola Clinton / Agatha Dalrymple / Bertha Smith / Mo Donaldson	4 episodes
2007–2008	EastEnders	Queenie Trott	8 episodes
2008	Keeping Up Appearances: Life Lessons from Onslow	Daisy	(archive footage only)
2014	Birds of a Feather	Annie	Episode: You Can't Always Get What You Want
2020	Pointless	Herself	Contestant
2023	Keeping Up Appearances - 30 Years Of Laughs	Herself/Daisy	Documentary
