= List of British film directors =

This is a list of film and television directors who were born or lived and worked in the United Kingdom for a significant part of their professional and personal life. Some Irish, American and European directors who have spent large portions of their career working in the British mainstream and independent cinema are included on this list.

== A ==
- Babar Ahmed
- Lewis Allen
- Lindsay Anderson
- Michael Anderson
- Michael Apted
- Andrea Arnold
- Amma Asante
- Anthony Asquith
- Richard Attenborough
- Paul WS Anderson
- Jane Arden
- Michael Armstrong
- Shona Auerbach
- Richard Ayoade

== B ==
- Roy Ward Baker
- Leedham Bantock
- Geoffrey Barkas
- Scott Barley
- Jessica Benhamou
- Sacha Bennett
- Daniel Birt
- Terry Bishop
- Farren Blackburn
- Keith Boak
- John Boorman
- John Boulting
- Danny Boyle
- Kenneth Branagh
- Alan Bridges
- Adrian Brunel
- Paul Bryers
- Clio Barnard
- Jack Bond
- Peter Brook

== C ==
- Danny Cannon
- Ben Caron
- Henry Cass
- Peter Cattaneo
- Charlie Chaplin
- Alan Clarke
- Noel Clarke
- Jack Clayton
- Alex Cox
- Charles Crichton
- Richard Curtis
- Alex Chandon
- Elaine Constantine
- Paddy Considine
- Mark Cousins

== D ==
- Stephen Daldry
- Desmond Davis
- Terence Davies
- Rowan Deacon
- Basil Dean
- Basil Dearden
- Clive Donner
- Bill Douglas

== E ==
- Sean Ellis
- Cy Endfield
- Rupert Everett

== F ==
- Terence Fisher
- Bill Forsyth
- Freddie Francis
- Stephen Frears
- Charles Frend
- Bryan Forbes
- Stephen Fry
- Albert Finney

== G ==
- Lewis Gilbert
- Terry Gilliam
- John Gilling
- Jonathan Glazer
- Peter Greenaway
- Val Guest
- Paul Greengrass
- Jack Gold

== H ==
- Andrew Haigh
- Robert Hamer
- Guy Hamilton
- John Harlow
- Tom Harper
- Will Hay
- Stuart Hazeldine
- Mark Herman
- David Hewlett (British-born Canadian)
- Alfred Hitchcock
- Mike Hodges
- Seth Holt
- Tom Hooper
- Peter Howitt
- Hugh Hudson
- Nicholas Hytner
- Joanna Hogg
- Andrew Haigh

== I ==
- Ian Emes
- John Irvin
- Armando Iannucci

== J ==
- Derek Jarman
- Julian Jarrold
- Garth Jennings
- Vicky Jewson
- Terry Jones
- Duncan Jones

== K ==
- Patrick Keiller
- Beeban Kidron
- Anthony Kimmins
- Bernard Knowles
- Alexander Korda
- Zoltan Korda
- Suri Krishnamma
- Stanley Kubrick (U.S.-born)

== L ==
- Simon Langton
- Frank Launder
- David Lean
- Malcolm Le Grice
- Francis Lee
- Mike Leigh
- David Leland
- Richard Lester
- Harry Lighton
- Phyllida Lloyd
- Ken Loach
- Adrian Lyne
- Jonathan Lynn
- Kim Longinotto
- Richard Loncraine
- Charles Laughton

== M ==
- John Madden
- James Marsh
- Neil Marshall
- Mary McGuckian
- Steve McQueen
- Shane Meadows
- Sam Mendes
- Anthony Minghella
- Martin McDonagh
- Norman McLaren
- Gillies MacKinnon
- Alexander Mackendrick
- Carol Morley

== N ==
- Ronald Neame
- Roy William Neill
- Mike Newell
- Christopher Nolan
- Serkan Nihat

== O ==
- George More O'Ferrall
- William Oldroyd

== P ==
- Nick Park
- Alan Parker
- Sally Potter
- Michael Powell
- Emeric Pressburger

== R ==
- Lynne Ramsay
- Carol Reed
- Michael Reeves
- Karel Reisz
- Lis Rhodes
- Tony Richardson
- Guy Ritchie
- Bruce Robinson
- Nicolas Roeg
- Bernard Rose
- Ken Russell

== S ==
- Charles Saunders
- Geoffrey Sax
- John Schlesinger
- Stefan Schwartz
- Ridley Scott
- Tony Scott
- Francis Searle
- Christopher Smith
- Roger Spottiswoode
- Rob Sorrenti
- Paul L. Stein
- Robert Stevenson
- Peter Strickland

== T ==
- Amanda Tapping (British-born Canadian)
- Gerald Thomas
- Ralph Thomas
- J. Lee Thompson
- Pete Travis

== U ==
- Peter Ustinov

== V ==
- Biju Viswanath
- Matthew Vaughn

== W ==
- Si Wall
- John Walsh
- Peter Watkins
- James Whale
- Kanchi Wichmann
- Georgina Willis
- Michael Winner
- Arthur B. Woods
- Edgar Wright
- Joe Wright
- Michael Winterbottom
- Simon West
- Ben Wheatley
- Harry Wootliff

== Y ==
- David Yates
- Peter Yates
- Terence Young

== See also ==
- British Academy Film Awards, hosted by the British Academy of Film and Television Arts, are the British equivalent of the Academy Awards.
- British Film Institute
- Cinema of Northern Ireland
- Cinema of Scotland
- Cinema of Wales
- Cine-variety
- Hollywood and the United Kingdom – British source material in American films, US studio subsidiaries in the UK, etc.
- Independent cinema in the United Kingdom
- List of Academy Award winners and nominees from Great Britain
- List of British films
- List of British actors
- List of British film studios
- List of cinema of the world
  - Cinema of Europe
- List of highest-grossing films in the United Kingdom
- London in film
- London Film School
- National Film and Television School
- World cinema
- UK cinema chains
