= London in film =

London has been used frequently both as a filming location and as a film setting. These have ranged from historical recreations of the Victorian London of Charles Dickens and Sherlock Holmes, to the romantic comedies of Bridget Jones's Diary and Notting Hill, by way of crime films, spy thrillers, science fiction and the "swinging London" films of the 1960s.

Because of the dominant role played by the city in the British culture, the number of British mainstream and independent films set in London is enormous. It has also been used many times in American films, and often recreated on a Hollywood studio backlot.

== Historical London ==
Historical recreations of London on screen have been relatively frequent. The Tudor, Victorian, Edwardian and Second World War periods in the city's history have all been regularly depicted.

=== Pre-Victorian London ===
London in the Elizabethan Era has often been portrayed in films, including Fire Over England (1937), The Private Lives of Elizabeth and Essex (1939), and Elizabeth (1998). Much of Shakespeare in Love (1998), a comedy involving Shakespeare in a fictionalised romance, was set around the original Globe Theatre, as was Laurence Olivier's 1944 Henry V.

The Tudor period has also been shown in other films, including the 1966 film of Robert Bolt's play A Man for All Seasons, the 1990s adaptation of Orlando and various versions of Mark Twain's The Prince and the Pauper.

Cromwell (1970) is one of the few films to show the city during the English Civil War, but several have been set during the subsequent restoration of the monarchy under Charles II. These include Nell Gwyn (1937), Forever Amber (1947) and Stage Beauty (2003). The 1995 film Restoration incorporates both the Great Plague and the Great Fire of 1665-66.

Late 18th and early 19th century London has been seen in a number of films, including Lady Hamilton (1941), Lady Caroline Lamb (1972), A Bequest to the Nation (1973), Princess Caraboo (1994), Sense and Sensibility (1995), and the various versions of The Scarlet Pimpernel.

=== Victorian London ===
One of the most popular images of the city is the Victorian era of Charles Dickens, Jack the Ripper and Sherlock Holmes. There have been almost 200 films based on the novels of Charles Dickens alone, beginning with the silent short film Death of Nancy Sykes in 1897. The most memorable of these are probably the musical Oliver! and the two David Lean films of Oliver Twist (1948) and Great Expectations (1946). Other film adaptations include David Copperfield in 1935 and 1969, Nicholas Nickleby in 1947 and 2002, The Pickwick Papers in 1952 and Little Dorrit in 1987. There have also been many versions of Dickens' A Christmas Carol, of which the 1951 Alastair Sim film Scrooge is often considered definitive.

Many films have also been made of the Sherlock Holmes stories by Arthur Conan Doyle. Basil Rathbone played Holmes in a series of American films from 1939 to 1946, with London recreated in Hollywood at 20th Century Fox and later Universal Studios. Other notable Holmes films which have strongly featured London backgrounds and locations are Young Sherlock Holmes (1985), Billy Wilder's The Private Life of Sherlock Holmes (1970), and the comedies The Adventure of Sherlock Holmes' Smarter Brother (1975) and Without a Clue (1988), as well as innumerable television films.

Holmes also dealt with the notorious Whitechapel serial killer Jack the Ripper in A Study in Terror in 1965 and Murder by Decree in 1978. The Ripper was also featured in Pandora's Box (1929), Jack the Ripper (1959), Dr. Jekyll and Sister Hyde (1971), Hands of the Ripper (1971), From Hell (2001) and several versions of The Lodger, including Hitchcock's silent film of 1926.

Much of the action in the Bram Stoker novel Dracula takes place in London, although several film adaptations have set it elsewhere. One notable exception is Bram Stoker's Dracula (1992), directed by Francis Ford Coppola.

Other films set in Victorian London include the 1945 version of The Picture of Dorian Gray, Victoria the Great (1937), Sixty Glorious Years (1938), The Mudlark (1950), The Wrong Box (1966), The Assassination Bureau (1968), The First Great Train Robbery (1978), Topsy-Turvy (1999), An Ideal Husband (1999), Shanghai Knights (2003), the 1956 version and 2004 version of Around the World in Eighty Days, the black-and-white film The Elephant Man (1980), based on the life of Joseph Merrick, and The Prestige (2005), set in the late Victorian era.

Other British cities, such as Edinburgh, or locations in other countries, are now often used for period films instead of filming in London itself. From Hell (2001), The League of Extraordinary Gentlemen (2003) and Roman Polanski's 2005 film of Oliver Twist all recreated Victorian London in Prague in the Czech Republic.

=== Twentieth century ===
Edwardian London has been depicted in several films, notably 2010 Academy Award Winner for Best Picture The King's Speech, Ealing comedy Kind Hearts and Coronets in 1949, the Merchant Ivory E. M. Forster adaptation Howards End (1992) and the biopic Young Winston (1972).

Wartime London has featured in many films, with The Man Who Loved Redheads and Zeppelin (1971) among those set during the First World War. The 1943 film The Life and Death of Colonel Blimp covered 40 years in the city, including the Edwardian era, the First World War and the Second World War. Several others made during the Second World War itself, featured London locations, including Millions Like Us (1943) and Waterloo Road (1944). The Blitz featured prominently in the Ealing drama The Bells Go Down (1943), and in Humphrey Jennings' drama-documentary Fires Were Started (1943). The latter featured real firemen recreating scenes from the bombings. At the same time, a number of London-set films were being made in Hollywood, like Waterloo Bridge (1940), Mrs. Miniver (1942) and Forever and a Day (1943). The latter followed several generations of owners of a London house until 1943. Later films set in the city during World War II include The Man Who Never Was (1955), I Was Monty's Double (1958), Battle of Britain (1969), Hanover Street (1979), Hope and Glory (1987), Shining Through (1992) and The End of the Affair (1999), as well as some low-budget Italian-made war films like Eagles Over London (1969) and From Hell to Victory (1979).

The 1950s has been recreated in several films including 84 Charing Cross Road (1987) and Shadowlands (1993). The 1960s has proved particularly popular with film makers in recent years, especially for crime films like Buster (1988), Scandal (1989), The Krays (1990), Honest (2000) and Gangster No. 1 (2000). Withnail and I (1987) economically recreated the Camden Town area in the 1960s.

== Postwar London ==
The Ealing comedies of the 1940s and 1950s made repeated use of locations in the city. Hue and Cry (1947) and Passport to Pimlico (1949) were memorably set in the ruins and bombsites of post-war London. In the 1950s The Lavender Hill Mob made extensive use of London locations, as did the dramas The Blue Lamp and Pool of London, while The Ladykillers used King's Cross Station and its surrounding marshalling yards as the backdrop to its story. The 1952 film The Happy Family is set on the South Bank during the lead up to the Festival of Britain.

Many other comedies have used locations in the city, some of the best known being The Ghosts of Berkeley Square (1947), Doctor in the House (1954), The Horse's Mouth (1958), Mars Attacks!, Independence Day: Resurgence, Nuns on the Run, Mr. Bean, Bedazzled (1967), Brassed Off (1996), Billy Elliot (2000) and Bend It Like Beckham (2002).

== Swinging London ==
With new developments in music, cinema and fashion, London found itself the centre of youth culture in the 1960s. The image of "swinging London", partly a creation of Time magazine, helped to fuel a production boom in the British film industry throughout the decade. The Beatles made memorable use of locations in the city in A Hard Day's Night (1964) (#1 in U.S.), and a huge number of other London-set films followed. These included The Pumpkin Eater, The Knack ...and How to Get It, Darling, Arabesque, Kaleidoscope, Georgy Girl, Morgan!, Alfie, Blowup, I'll Never Forget What's'isname, Casino Royale, Poor Cow, Up the Junction, Bedazzled, To Sir, with Love, The Jokers, Otley, Wonderwall, Smashing Time, Salt and Pepper and The Italian Job.

== Romantic London ==
The city has often been used as the backdrop for romances like Indiscreet (1958) with Cary Grant and Ingrid Bergman and A Touch of Class (1973), and has become popular for romantic comedies in recent years. This is at least partly due to the television and film writer Richard Curtis, who has written some of the most successful British films of recent years — The Tall Guy (1989), Four Weddings and a Funeral (1994), Notting Hill (1999) and Love Actually (2003), all set or partly set in the city. The films follow the awkward love lives of largely upper-middle class characters (aside from The Tall Guy, always including one played by Hugh Grant). The majority of the Bridget Jones films are set and shot in London.

Curtis has been criticised for pandering to the American market by playing to the stereotype of the English as posh, socially awkward eccentrics. This hasn't stopped the films generally being a huge success in the American and British cinema box office charts. Other films which have followed in Curtis's footsteps include Sliding Doors (1998), Martha, Meet Frank, Daniel and Laurence (1998), About a Boy (2002), Wimbledon, and the American film What a Girl Wants (2002). Londinium (2001) used locations in Berkeley Square, Mayfair, Hyde Park, Primrose Hill Park and at Waterloo station. Man Up (2015) is mostly set in the city with focus on the South Bank.

Natalie Portman, Julia Roberts, Jude Law and Clive Owen conducted their affairs around various parts of London in Closer (2004), which uses locations such as Clerkenwell, the London Aquarium, Bloomsbury, the River Thames and the Theatre Royal in Drury Lane.

Woody Allen's Match Point (2005), uses a very up-market view of the city to reflect the upper class lives of the protagonists, including locations in Notting Hill, Belgravia, Chelsea, St. James's Park and Tate Modern.

Director Raine Allen-Miller's Rye Lane unfolds against the photographed backdrop of South London locales Peckham, Brixton, Brockwell Park, and the South Bank.

== Thrillers ==
Alfred Hitchcock probably started the fashion for using London landmarks for spy films, starting with Blackmail in 1929, which was set entirely in the city and finished on the dome of the British Museum. Many of his other thrillers followed a similar pattern, including The Man Who Knew Too Much (both the 1934 and 1956 versions), The 39 Steps (1935), Sabotage (1937), Foreign Correspondent (1940), Stage Fright (1950) and Frenzy (1972). London has since featured in many other thrillers, including Hunted (1952) The Yellow Balloon (1953) Sapphire (1959), Bunny Lake Is Missing (1965), The IPCRESS File (1965), The Spy Who Came in from the Cold (1965), The Deadly Affair (1966), Arabesque (1966), The Black Windmill (1974), The Whistle Blower (1987), The Fourth Protocol (1987), Blue Ice (1992), The Innocent Sleep (1995) and briefly in Mission: Impossible (1996) and the Bollywood feature film Bade Miyan Chote Miyan (2024). This trend was spoofed in the films Otley (1968) with Tom Courtenay, and more recently in The Man Who Knew Too Little (1997) with Bill Murray and the Austin Powers films (#1 in U.S. box office). Anthony Minghella's film Breaking and Entering (2006) with Jude Law is named also a Romantic drama.

Landmarks featured in some of these films include the Royal Albert Hall, Westminster Abbey and Trafalgar Square. Both Night of the Demon (1957) and The IPCRESS File (1965) feature scenes filmed in the famous reading room at the British Museum. The 1978 version of The Thirty Nine Steps features a climax on the clock face of Big Ben, an idea borrowed from the 1943 Will Hay comedy My Learned Friend. A similar scene features in the 2003 Jackie Chan film Shanghai Knights.

Several American thrillers have also produced mangled versions of London's geography, including 23 Paces to Baker Street (1956), Midnight Lace (1960) and The Mummy Returns (2001) (#1 in U.S.), which features a chase across Tower Bridge on a double-decker bus and several scenes inside the British Museum. The 1944 version of The Lodger also features a scene by Tower Bridge, although the film was set several years before it was built.

Britain's most famous spy, James Bond, generally spends little time in London, other than to receive his orders from his boss 'M'. However, some of the films do feature locations in the city. These include On Her Majesty's Secret Service (1969) (#1 in U.S.) in which George Lazenby as Bond visits the College of Arms and For Your Eyes Only (1981) (#1 in U.S.), in which Roger Moore experiences a hair-raising helicopter flight over the Docklands area. In the more recent Pierce Brosnan films, the Secret Service's headquarters are identified as being the new MI6 building on the River Thames at Vauxhall. The 1999 film The World Is Not Enough (#1 in U.S.) opens with an extended boat chase from the MI6 building down the river to the Millennium Dome, while in Die Another Day (2002) (#1 in U.S.) Bond visits a secret base in a disused Underground station, and makes a rare trip to his club Blades. Also in the 2012 Bond movie Skyfall (#1 in U.S.), Bond spends more time in London. First while he visits M's house to get back to service. Then to new underground office of MI6, then to the Art Gallery to meet the new Quartermaster. After returning from Shanghai also, Bond spends time in London before going to Scotland. He chases Silva in London Tube and other areas in London. Also at the end of Movie, Bond sees London from his office terrace. The 1967 version of Casino Royale makes extensive use of London locations, including 10 Downing Street, Whitehall, Trafalgar Square (with Nelson's Column replaced by a flying saucer) as well as showing the Changing of the Guard outside Buckingham Palace.

Parts of Christopher Nolan's The Dark Knight Rises (2012) (#1 in U.S.) were also filmed in London.

== London Underground ==
London's underground railway system, known as the Tube, has featured in several films. The plot of Sliding Doors (1998) hinges on whether Gwyneth Paltrow's character catches a particular Tube train or not. Bulldog Jack (1934), Man Hunt (1941), The Good Die Young (1954), and 28 Weeks Later (2007) all include chase sequences across underground tracks.

A number of horror films have also used the subterranean network of tunnels as an atmospheric location, most notably the John Landis hit An American Werewolf in London (1981) (#1 in U.S.), which contains a famous scene set in Tottenham Court Road tube station, and the 2004 film Creep. The eerie 1973 horror Death Line stars Donald Pleasence as a Scotland Yard detective who traces a series of murders to cannibals living in the network's tunnels.

Excavations on the Underground unearthed an ancient alien spacecraft in Quatermass and the Pit (1967), and dormant dragons in Reign of Fire (2002).

The 2002 James Bond film Die Another Day features a secret MI6 facility in a fictional disused Underground Station called Vauxhall Cross. The 2012 Bond film Skyfall sets a long chase scene in the London Underground near a makeshift underground MI6 base near the Old Bailey. Another fictional station, Hobbs End, features in the 1967 science fiction film Quatermass and the Pit. Deleted scenes for Shaun of the Dead features the fictional Crouch End station.

Other films to have featured the Underground include Passport to Pimlico (1949), The Yellow Balloon (1953), Georgy Girl (1966), The Fourth Protocol (1987), Hidden City (1988) and Tube Tales (1999). The makers of the children's film The Boy Who Turned Yellow (1972) managed to persuade London Underground to paint a tube train yellow.

A rare recreation of the network in the Edwardian era featured in the adaptation of Henry James's The Wings of the Dove in 1997. The London underground of the 1920s is also recorded in Anthony Asquith's silent classic Underground (1928), while the 1969 film Battle of Britain shows the tunnel network converted to provide shelter for Londoners during the Blitz.

Aldwych tube station, formerly on a branch of the Piccadilly line, has been used as the location for many films and television productions, especially since the branch and station closed in 1994 and the platforms have been left intact making it suitable for filming and photography purposes, due to the absence of a regular train service. A 1970s tube train permanently is based at the station and heritage rolling stock can be brought in for filming - London Underground have retained one of their 1938 trains which can be used for historic appearances. In more recent years filming has also taken place at the former Jubilee line platforms at Charing Cross station, which were withdrawn from regular use when the line was extended in 1999 avoiding the station.

More recently, Canary Wharf tube station was used as a filming location in the 2016 Star Wars film Rogue One, posing as a hallway in the Scarif Imperial Security Complex.

== Science fiction ==
Nigel Kneale's Quatermass films and television series helped to popularise London as the setting for science fiction stories. The Quatermass Xperiment (1955) ends with Professor Quatermass cornering an alien monster in Westminster Abbey, while Quatermass and the Pit (1967) begins with an alien space craft being discovered during the construction of a new London Underground station. The John Wyndham novel The Day of the Triffids was made into a film in 1962 which also features scenes in London, while the much-derided 1985 film Lifeforce involved vampires from space taking over the city.

The 1950 thriller Seven Days to Noon featured a scientist who threatens to destroy London with a nuclear bomb, and was notable for its scenes of the city's evacuated and deserted streets. Despite the great difficulties involved in achieving this, the feat was repeated for the horror film 28 Days Later in 2002, which begins with the hero waking from a coma and wandering across a deserted Westminster Bridge.

Another nuclear threat was explored in The Day the Earth Caught Fire (1961) which has many notable scenes in London, including the Thames running dry. It also includes a lot of scenes inside the old Express Building on Fleet Street and Arthur Christiansen, the recently retired editor of the Daily Express, effectively plays himself.

Both Things to Come (1936) and The Hitchhiker's Guide to the Galaxy (2005) begin with the city being destroyed, by war and alien attack respectively, while the 2004 horror comedy Shaun of the Dead is set in the city during a zombie attack.

The 1960 film The Time Machine, based on the novel by H. G. Wells, featured an inventor in Victorian London named H. George Wells (played by Rod Taylor) who builds a time machine and time travels all the way to the year October 12, 802,701 where he finds that the human race has divided into two species - the surface dwelling Eloi and the underground dwelling Morlocks. While there, George falls in love with one of the Eloi named Weena (played by Yvette Mimieux).

The 1966 film Daleks' Invasion Earth: 2150 A.D., based on the Doctor Who story The Dalek Invasion of Earth from 1964, is set in part in a future version of London, which has been nearly destroyed by alien invasion.

Futuristic London is terrorized in the 2006 film V for Vendetta (#1 in U.S.) by a mysterious, masked anarchist who wishes to destroy the fascist government. The film was based on the graphic novel V for Vendetta. In Children of Men (2006), the London of 2027 is a grim place, full of refugees, armed policemen and exploding bombs. Locations used include Tate Britain, Battersea Power Station, the Mall and Admiralty Arch.

The Bollywood sci-fi Superhero adventure Ra.One begins in London, where the protagonist Dr. Shekhar Subramanium (played by Shahrukh Khan) works at the fictional Barron Industries. Much of the film was shot in various parts of the city.

Recently, Attack the Block (2011) features a gang protecting their housing estate from an alien invasion, 2013 American science fiction film Star Trek Into Darkness is partially set in London of the distant future.

== Criminals ==
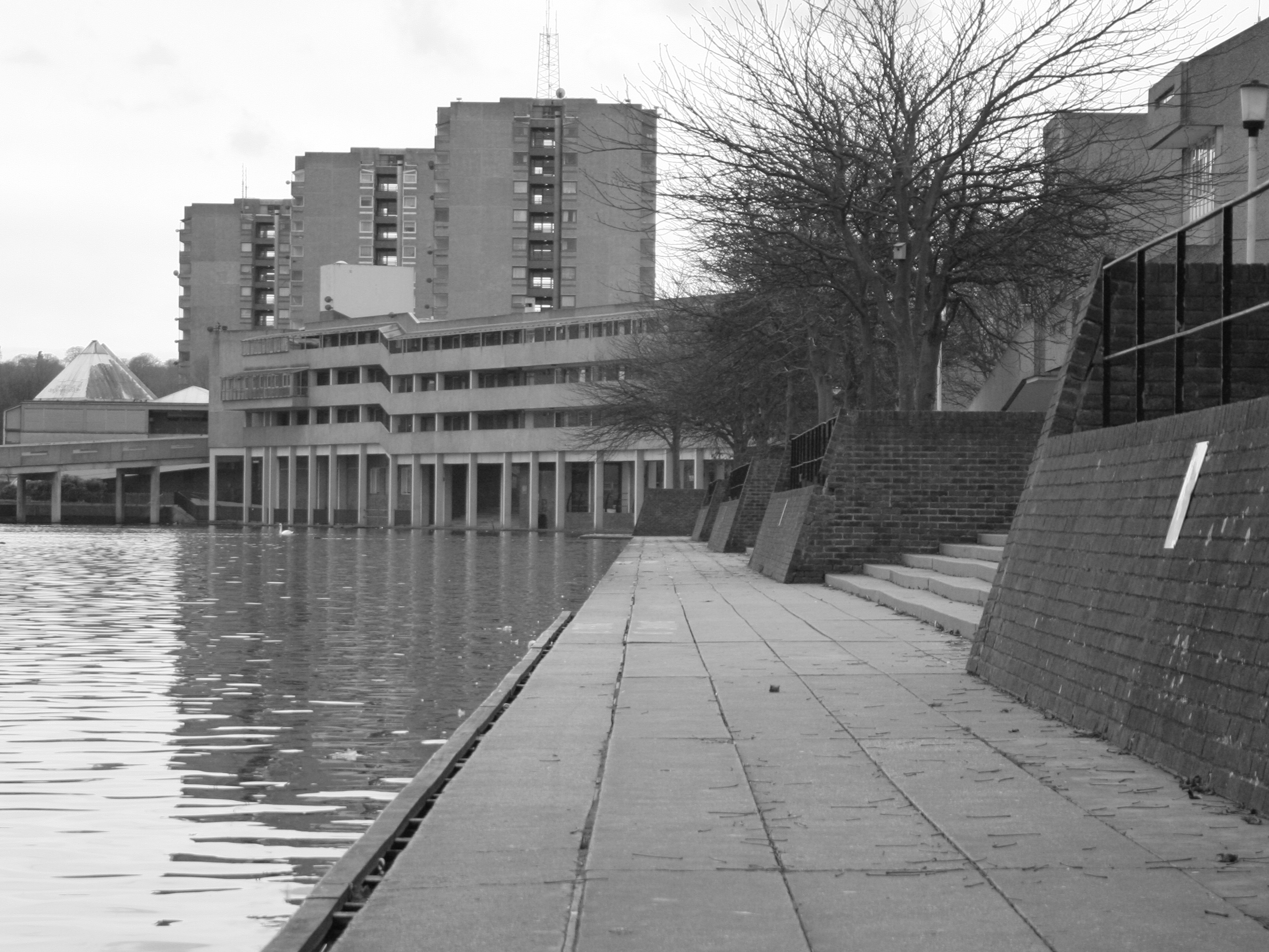
Thamesmead South Housing Estate features in A Clockwork Orange where Alex knocks his rebellious droogs into the lake in a sudden surprise attack.

Historic periods in the city's underworld have been portrayed in a small number of films. Examples include Where's Jack? (17th century), The First Great Train Robbery (Victorian era), Chicago Joe and the Showgirl (World War II) and The Krays (the 1960s), while 10 Rillington Place (1971) recreated 1940s London, filming in the actual street where John Christie carried out his infamous murders.

Other films have evoked London's underworld in the modern era, including Robbery (1967), Performance (1970), Villain (1971), Brannigan (1975), Sweeney! (1977), The Long Good Friday (1980), Mona Lisa (1986), Face (1997), Lock, Stock and Two Smoking Barrels (1998), G:MT – Greenwich Mean Time (1999), Snatch (2000), Sexy Beast (2000) and Layer Cake (2004), and Blue Story (2019).

Set in a dystopian near-future Britain, A Clockwork Orange (1971), featuring youth gangs, was filmed in metropolitan London.

== The other side of London ==
A number of films have depicted the underbelly of the city away from the familiar tourist sites. Examples of these include Up the Junction, Follow Me!, Nil by Mouth, Dirty Pretty Things, Eastern Promises and two out of every three films directed by Mike Leigh. The East End meanwhile, was shown in The Man Who Knew Too Much (1934), Waterloo Road (1944), It Always Rains on Sunday (1947) and A Kid for Two Farthings (1955), among others.

The 1967 documentary The London Nobody Knows, based on the book of the same name by Geoffrey Scowcroft Fletcher and presented by James Mason, attempted to show some unfamiliar aspects of the city, as did Patrick Keiller's 1994 documentary London. This approach has since been emulated by the Saint Etienne films Finisterre (2002) and What Have You Done Today, Mervyn Day? (2005). The latter attempted to capture the state of the Lower Lea Valley prior to its transformation ahead of the 2012 London Olympics.

Other films have tried to use less familiar locations in a new way. The 1995 version of Richard III, starring Ian McKellen, which is set in a fictional 1930s fascist version of England, makes imaginative use of London locations such as St Cuthbert's church, St Pancras chambers (the old Midland Grand Hotel), the University of London's Senate House, and the two Gilbert Scott power stations — Bankside serving for the Tower and the decrepit Battersea Power Station as the setting for the final battle scenes. Terry Gilliam's 1985 Orwellian fantasy Brazil also used the cooling towers of the same power station as a location, as did Michael Radford's 1984 film version of George Orwell's novel Nineteen Eighty-Four.

London Kills Me (1991) portrays the city's immigrant and drug subcultures in the early Thatcher years, in a similar vein as My Beautiful Laundrette (1985). The 2007 film by Ken Loach It's a Free World... considered the ethical dilemmas regarding London's vast trade in illegal workers.

The acclaimed 1996 film Beautiful Thing depicted the lives of two gay teenagers living on the South London housing estate of Thamesmead. Similar themes, as well as race, were part of the 1970s set Young Soul Rebels, the debut of Derek Jarman protege Isaac Julien (1991).

Recent films include Breaking and Entering, a 2006 romantic drama, by Academy Award-winning director Anthony Minghella, shot and set in King's Cross, a blighted, inner-city neighbourhood of London, examines an affair which unfolds between a successful British landscape architect and a Bosnian woman. The mother in Breaking and Entering has a troubled teenage son who was widowed by the war in Bosnia and Herzegovina. Rocks (2019) follows an abandoned teenage girl in a coming of age story.

== Kids' London ==
London has been a popular location for children's (and especially Disney) films over the last 40 years. The animated features The Adventures of Ichabod and Mr. Toad (1949), Peter Pan (1953), One Hundred and One Dalmatians (1961), The Sword in the Stone (1963) and Basil, the Great Mouse Detective (known in North America as The Great Mouse Detective) (1986) were all set in the city, as were Mary Poppins (1964) (#1 in U.S.) and part of Bedknobs and Broomsticks (1971). These, however, were all filmed in the U.S.. The opening setting of Pocahontas (1995) is in London. The educational Disney short The Truth About Mother Goose (1957) featured London while showing the history behind the nursery rhymes Little Jack Horner and London Bridge Is Falling Down. The Mickey Mouse shorts Mickey's Christmas Carol (1983) and The Prince and the Pauper (1990) were set in London.

Recent animated features set in London include Flushed Away (2006), in which the protagonist, Roddy, is from South Kensington and is transported to a recreated London in the London sewers. Cars 2 (2011) was partly set in London. The 2012 film Madagascar 3: Europe's Most Wanted was also partially set in London, with a circus sequence on the Thames.

In more recent years The Parent Trap (1998 version), Winning London, The Great Muppet Caper, the 1996 live-action remake of 101 Dalmatians (#1 in U.S.) and the 2018 film Christopher Robin all used actual locations in the city, as did the 1975 Disney comedy One of Our Dinosaurs is Missing, which was largely set around the Natural History Museum in the early 20th century. The Muppet Christmas Carol (1992) was set in Victorian London, but largely used Shepperton Studios. The film Melody (1970) (also known as S.W.A.L.K.) was filmed in and around Lambeth and Vauxhall and reunited Mark Lester and Jack Wild after their appearance in Oliver!.

The Harry Potter films (#1 in U.S. box office) also feature some famous London locations. The London Zoo, King's Cross station, and Leadenhall Market (Diagon Alley) are among those used.

Stormbreaker, the first novel in the bestselling Alex Rider series by Anthony Horowitz, was turned into a film in 2006. It features locations in London such as Hyde Park, Piccadilly Circus, and the Science Museum. The film also features several action sequences in the city, including a horse chase through central London and the main characters fighting on the rooftop of a skyscraper.

Live-action animated films set in London include the Paddington film series which features several London locations, and includes modern landmarks such as The Shard and the London Eye, Peter Rabbit, and the Paramount film, Sonic the Hedgehog 3, is filmed and set in London.

== Musical London ==
Cliff Richard was a film star with three successful musical comedies in the early 1960s. The first of these, The Young Ones (1961), was set in London. Cliff, The Shadows, and others need money to save their youth club, so they set up a pirate radio station to generate publicity for the show. Although Cliff's second hit, Summer Holiday (1963), mostly took place while driving across Europe, it prominently featured a red London AEC RT bus.

The success of some of these 1960s films helped to make up for London Town, Britain's first Technicolor musical, which was a high-profile flop in 1946.

Mary Poppins (1964) was a critical and popular success, winning multiple Oscars for its editing, music (including Best Song for "Chim Chim Cher-ee"), and visual effects (notably the scene combining live action and animation). Lead actress Julie Andrews won an Academy Award for Best Actress.

Also in 1964, Audrey Hepburn starred in My Fair Lady, the film of the musical of the George Bernard Shaw play Pygmalion. George Cukor's decision to award the role of Eliza Doolittle to Hepburn was perceived by many as a snub to Julie Andrews, who had played the part to great acclaim on Broadway. This is another film with some famous songs, including "Wouldn't It Be Loverly", "I Could Have Danced all Night" and "Get Me to the Church on Time". Marni Nixon's voice was used in place of Audrey Hepburn's for the songs.

In Half a Sixpence (1967), professional cheery cockney Tommy Steele plays Arthur Kipps, a cockney who unexpectedly comes into some money, in a musical version of H. G. Wells's novel Kipps.

Oliver! (1968), the musical based on Oliver Twist, includes the songs Food, Glorious Food, Consider Yourself and You've Got To Pick A Pocket Or Two. Two more Dickens stories turned into musicals were A Christmas Carol (filmed as Scrooge in 1970) and The Old Curiosity Shop, which became Mr Quilp in 1975.

The musical adaptation of Goodbye, Mr. Chips with Peter O'Toole and Petula Clark made use of several London locations, including the dining room at the Savoy Hotel and the Salisbury pub in the heart of the West End.

Quadrophenia (1979) draws its soundtrack from the album of the same name, a rock opera by The Who. It tells the story of Jimmy, a disaffected teenager, taking his scooter to Brighton for the August bank holiday with a group of Mods, and taking part in one of the notorious 'battles' between Mods and Rockers.

Punk, one of London's notable contributions to pop music, is the subject of Sid and Nancy (1986), a biopic of Sid Vicious, bassist with the Sex Pistols. Gary Oldman stars as Vicious. Also see the punk-rockumentaries directed by Julien Temple, the first being band manager Malcolm McLaren's take on 'his' invention of punk in his The Great Rock 'n' Roll Swindle and the more recent return volley by the estranged band members in The Filth and the Fury.

The South London reggae scene is notably represented in Babylon (1980).

SpiceWorld (1997) was a comedy starring pop girl group the Spice Girls. It was a commercial success but widely panned by critics.

Early Victorian London was the setting for 2007's musical Sweeney Todd: The Demon Barber of Fleet Street.

K-On! The Movie (2011) is the first Japanese animated musical film to be set in London, as it features a band whose music is inspired by British rock music. The band performs their original songs at Jubilee Gardens.

== See also ==
- British Academy Film Awards, hosted by the British Academy of Film and Television Arts, are the British equivalent of the Academy Awards.
- British Film Institute
- Cinema of Northern Ireland
- Cinema of Scotland
- Cinema of Wales
- Cine-variety
- Hollywood and the United Kingdom – British source material in American films, US studio subsidiaries in the UK, etc.
- Independent cinema in the United Kingdom
- List of Academy Award winners and nominees from Great Britain
- List of British films
- List of British actors
- List of British film directors
- List of British film studios
- List of cinema of the world
  - Cinema of Europe
- List of highest-grossing films in the United Kingdom
- List of television shows set in London
- London Film School
- National Film and Television School
- World cinema
- UK cinema chains
