= Cardinal Cap Alley =

Alley in the London Borough of Southwark

Coordinates: 51.5081°N 0.0976°W

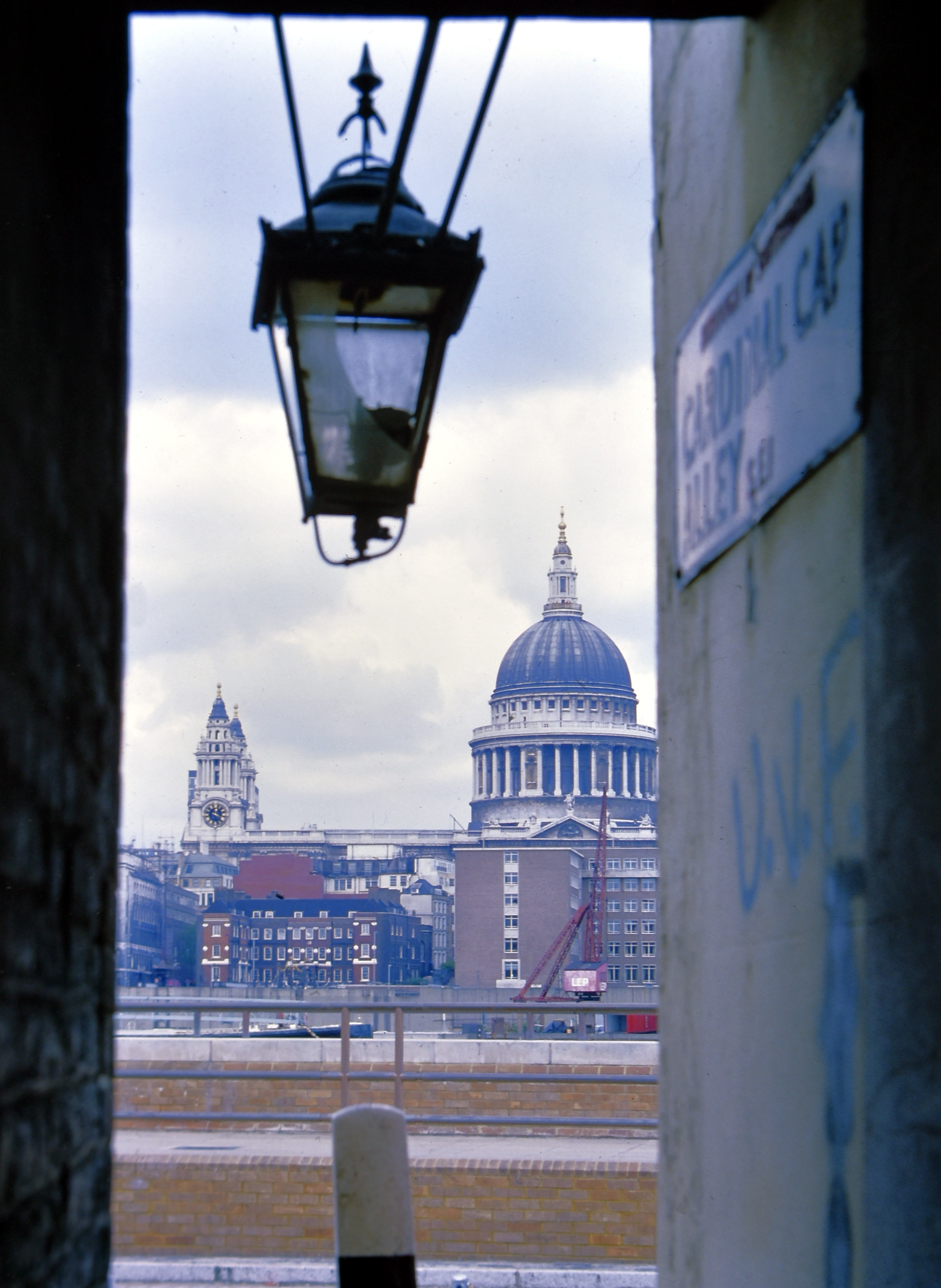
View of Saint Paul's Cathedral from Cardinal Cap Alley before the alley was gated in the early 1990s

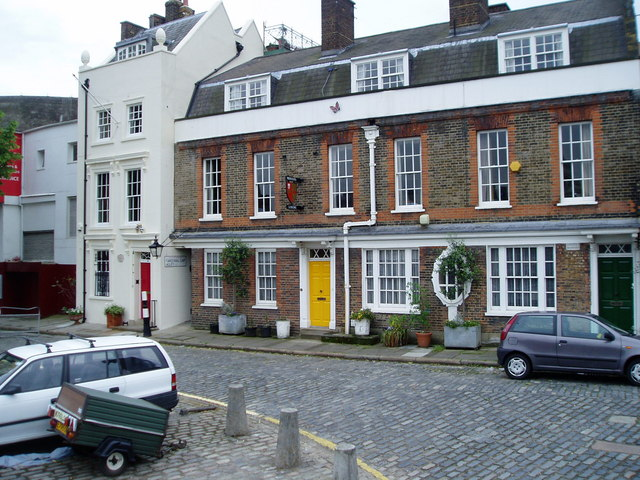
The entrance to the alley is under the lamp, left of the yellow door

Cardinal Cap Alley is an alley in Bankside. It used to lead to a brothel called The Cardinal's Cap named because it had been owned by Henry Cardinal Beaufort, the Bishop of Winchester, who had paraded here wearing his red hat, after being appointed a cardinal by the Pope.

The architectural critic Ian Nairn highlighted it in his 1966 guidebook to London, and the following year it featured in the documentary The London Nobody Knows, based on the Geoffrey Fletcher book of the same name. It has been gated since the 1990s.
