= Scowcroft =

Scowcroft is a surname. Notable people with the surname include:

- Brent Scowcroft (1925–2020), former United States National Security Advisor
- James Scowcroft (born 1975), United Kingdom footballer

== See also ==
- Geoffrey Scowcroft Fletcher (1923–2004), British artist and art critic
- The Scowcroft Group, an international business advisory firm managed by Brent Scowcroft
