= Independent cinema =

Independent Cinema may refer to:

- Independent film, film made outside of the major film studio system
  - Independent movie theater, movie theater screening non-mainstream films
    - Independent cinema in the United Kingdom, such theatres in the UK
  - Parallel cinema, independent films of India
