= List of television shows set in London =

This is a list of television shows set in London.

== List ==
Title	Start	End	Comment
24: Live Another Day	2014		Series was a 24 limited event television series
2point4 Children	1991	1999	Set in Chiswick
Absolute Power	2003	2005	
Absolutely Fabulous	1992	2012	
The Adventures of Sherlock Holmes	1984	1994	
The Agency	2024		
Are You Being Served?	1972	1985	
As If	2001		
As Time Goes By	1992	2002	Set in Holland Park
Ashes to Ashes	2008		
The Avengers	1961	1969	
The New Avengers	1976	1977	
Babes in the Wood	1998	1999	Set in St John's Wood
Bad Girls	1999	2006	Set in HMP Larkhall (fictional), South London
Between the Lines	1992	1994	
Big Deal	1984	1986	
The Bill	1984	2010	
The Black Adder	1983		
Blackadder II	1986		
Blackadder the Third	1987		
Black Books	2000	2004	Filmed in Bloomsbury
Black Mirror	2016		Mainly set throughout the United Kingdom, with first episode of the series, “The National Anthem”, set in London.
Bless This House	1971	1976	Set in Putney
Bottom	1991	1995	Set in Hammersmith
Bridgerton	2020		
Brush Strokes	1986	1991	Set in Motspur Park
The Buddha of Suburbia	1993		
Bugs	1995		Docklands
Call the Midwife	2012		
Capital	2015		
Capital City	1989	1990	
The Capture	2019		
The Chelsea Detective	2022		
Citizen Smith	1977	1980	Set in Tooting
Cleaning Up	2019		Set in Canary Wharf
Crapston Villas	1995		
The Crown	2016	2023	
Danger Mouse	1981	1992	
Bodyguard			
Desmond's	1989	1994	Set in Peckham
Dixon of Dock Green	1955	1978	
Doctor Who			Numerous episodes set in London, most notably "Rose", "Aliens of London" and "The Christmas Invasion"; also classic serials "An Unearthly Child" (Shoreditch), "The Dalek Invasion of Earth", "The War Machines", "The Talons of Weng-Chiang" and "Survival" (Perivale)
Drop the Dead Donkey	1990	1998	
The Duchess of Duke Street	1976	1977	
EastEnders	1985		Set in London borough of Walford (fictional)
Extraordinary	2023	2024	
Family Affairs	1997	2005	Set in London borough of Charnham
The Flatshare	2022		
Fleabag	2016	2019	
Footballers' Wives	2002	2006	
Friday Night Dinner	2011	2020	Set in Mill Hill
Gangs of London	2020		
Garrow's Law	2009	2010	
The Gentlemen	2024		
George and Mildred	1976	1979	
Gimme Gimme Gimme	1999	2001	Camden
Giri/Haji	2019		
The Gnomes of Dulwich	1969		
The Goodies	1970	1982	
The Good Life	1975	1978	Set in Surbiton
Goodnight Sweetheart	1993	2016	
Grange Hill	1978	2008	
Hancock's Half Hour	1954	1961	Set in Cheam
Hardware	2003	2004	
Harlots	2017	2019	
Hotel Babylon	2006	2009	
House of Cards	1990		Set in Westminster
Hustle	2004	2012	
The Irregulars	2021		
Industry	2020		
The IT Crowd	2006	2013	
It's a Sin			
Jeeves and Wooster	1990	1993	
Keen Eddie	2003	2004	
Killing Eve	2018	2022	
The Kumars at No. 42	2014		Set in Wembley
The Last Detective	2003	2007	Set in Willesden
Ladies of London	2014	2026	
Law & Order: UK	2009	2014	
Layton Mystery Tanteisha: Katori no Nazotoki File	2018	2019	
Lead Balloon	2006	2011	
Line of Duty	2012		
London Bridge	1996	1999	Set in the SE1 postcode district
London Kills	2019		
Lucy in London	1966		
Luther	2010	2019	
Marcella	2016	2018	
May to December	1989	1994	Set in Pinner
Men Behaving Badly	1992		
Metrosexuality	2001		Set in Notting Hill
The Mighty Boosh	2004	2007	Set in Shoreditch
Minder	1979	2009	
Misfits	2009	2013	
Mobland	2025		
Mongrels	2010	2011	Set in Isle of Dogs
Moriarty the Patriot	2020		
My Family	2000	2011	Set in Chiswick
My Hero	2000	2006	Set in Northolt
Nathan Barley	2005		Set in Shoreditch
Neverwhere	1996		"London Below", a fictional realm co-existing with London
The New Statesman	1987	1994	
New Tricks	2003	2015	
Not Going Out	2006		
NY-LON	2004		
One Foot in the Grave	1990	2000	Set in the N1 postcode district
Only Fools and Horses	1981	2003	Set in Peckham
'Orrible	2001		
Orson and Olivia	1993		
Paddington Bear	1989	1990	
Peep Show	2003	2015	
Penny Crayon	1989	1990	
Penny Dreadful	2014	2016	
PhoneShop	2009	2013	Set in London Borough of Sutton
Porkpie	1995	1996	Set in Peckham
Pulling	2006	2009	Set in Hackney
Pure	2019		
The Professionals	1977	1983	
QB VII	1974		
Red Eye	2024		
Rentaghost	1976	1984	Set in Ealing
Ripper Street	2012		
The Rivals of Sherlock Holmes	1971	1973	
River	2015		
Rumpole of the Bailey	1978	1992	Set mainly in the area around the Old Bailey
Secret Diary of a Call Girl	2007	2011	
Sherlock	2010	2017	
Slow Horses	2022		
Some Girls	2012	2014	
Some Mothers Do 'Ave 'Em	1973	1978	
Spaced	1999	2001	Filmed in Tufnell Park
Spooks	2002	2011	
Spotless	2015		
Stath Lets Flats	2018	2021	Set in Green Lanes, Edgware
Steptoe and Son	1962	1974	
Strike	2017		
The Sweeney	1975	1978	
Ted Lasso	2020		Set in Richmond
Terry and June	1979	1987	Set in Purley, London Borough of Croydon
The Thick of It	2005	2012	Set in the City of Westminster
The Thin Blue Line	1995	1996	Set in the London borough of Gasforth (fictional)
White Teeth	2002		
The Tomorrow People	1973	1979	
Tony Bennett at the Talk of the Town	1972		
Top Boy	2011	2023	
Trust	2003		Set in the City of London
The Undeclared War	2022		Set mainly inside GCHQ
Upstairs, Downstairs	1971	1975	Set in 165 Eaton Place
Upstart Crow	2016	2020	
W1A	2014	2017	Set in the London headquarters of the BBC, Broadcasting House
Waking The Dead	2000	2011	
War of the Worlds	2019	2022	
The War of the Worlds	2019		
Whitechapel	2009	2013	
William and Mary	2003	2005	
The Wombles	1973	1975	Set below Wimbledon Common
Yes Minister (including Yes, Prime Minister)	1980	1988	Set in a civil service office in Whitehall
The Young Ones	1982	1984	
You	2023		Its fourth season is set in London

== Miniseries, specials or individual episodes ==
Series	Episode	Year	Comment
Scooby-Doo, Where Are You!	What a Night for a Knight		
Ben 10: Omniverse	An American Benwolf in London		
Elementary	Step Nine	2013	
Friends	The One with Ross's Wedding	1998	
Bones	The Yanks in the U.K	2008	
The Legend of Tarzan	The Hidden World		
Totally Spies!	Totally Dunzo		
Transformers: The Headmasters	Terror! The Six Shadows		
Danger Rangers	Water Works; Chem Gems		
Scooby-Doo and Guess Who?	Elementary, My Dear Shaggy!		
Doki	Happy New Year... Again!		
World of Winx	Shattered Dreams		
Bailey's Comets	Ghost of a Clue		
The Country Mouse and the City Mouse Adventures	Those Amazing Mice in Their Flying Machines		
Liberty's Kids	The Intolerable Acts		
Don't Blame The Koalas	Fate Steps In		
The Life of Mammals	Insect Hunters		
Skins	Skins Fire; Skins Pure		

== See also ==
- London in film
