= Hollywood and the United Kingdom =

UK influence in Hollywood film making

Hollywood and the United Kingdom are connected via the American film industry's use of British source material, an exchange of talent, and Hollywood's financial investment in British facilities and productions. The American studios have had their own bases in the UK in the past, such as MGM-British, and Warner Bros. owned shares in the now long disestablished British distributor Warner-Pathé, once part of the Associated British Pictures Corporation. The U.K. has had major production studios in the United States such as Trilith Studios.

== British source material ==
Numerous Hollywood films have a British dimension (based on British people, stories or events), many of which have had enormous worldwide commercial success. Two of the top eight highest-grossing films worldwide of all time have some British historical, cultural or creative dimensions: Titanic (1997), Harry Potter and the Deathly Hallows – Part 2 (2011), The Lord of the Rings: The Return of the King (2003), made in New Zealand, and Pirates of the Caribbean: Dead Man's Chest (2006). Adding four more Harry Potter films and one more Lord of the Rings movie, plus the Tim Burton version of Alice in Wonderland (2010), and more than half of the top twenty most financially successful films, had a substantial British dimension.

British influence can also be seen with the 'English Cycle' of Disney animated films, which include Alice in Wonderland (1951), Peter Pan (1953), One Hundred and One Dalmatians (1961), The Sword in the Stone (1963), and The Jungle Book (1967). Disney first became interested in live-action films as a means of using financial reserves which had built up in Britain, and could not be repatriated owing to exchange controls, by making two films from Scottish and English sources. These were Treasure Island (1950) and The Story of Robin Hood and His Merrie Men (1952), which were both successes at the box office. The studio continued to draw on British source material for its animated films after Walt Disney's death in 1967, with the cartoon feature films Robin Hood (1973), The Rescuers (1976) and The Many Adventures of Winnie the Pooh (1977), one of many Disney to draw on A. A. Milne's characters.

== Exchange of Talent ==
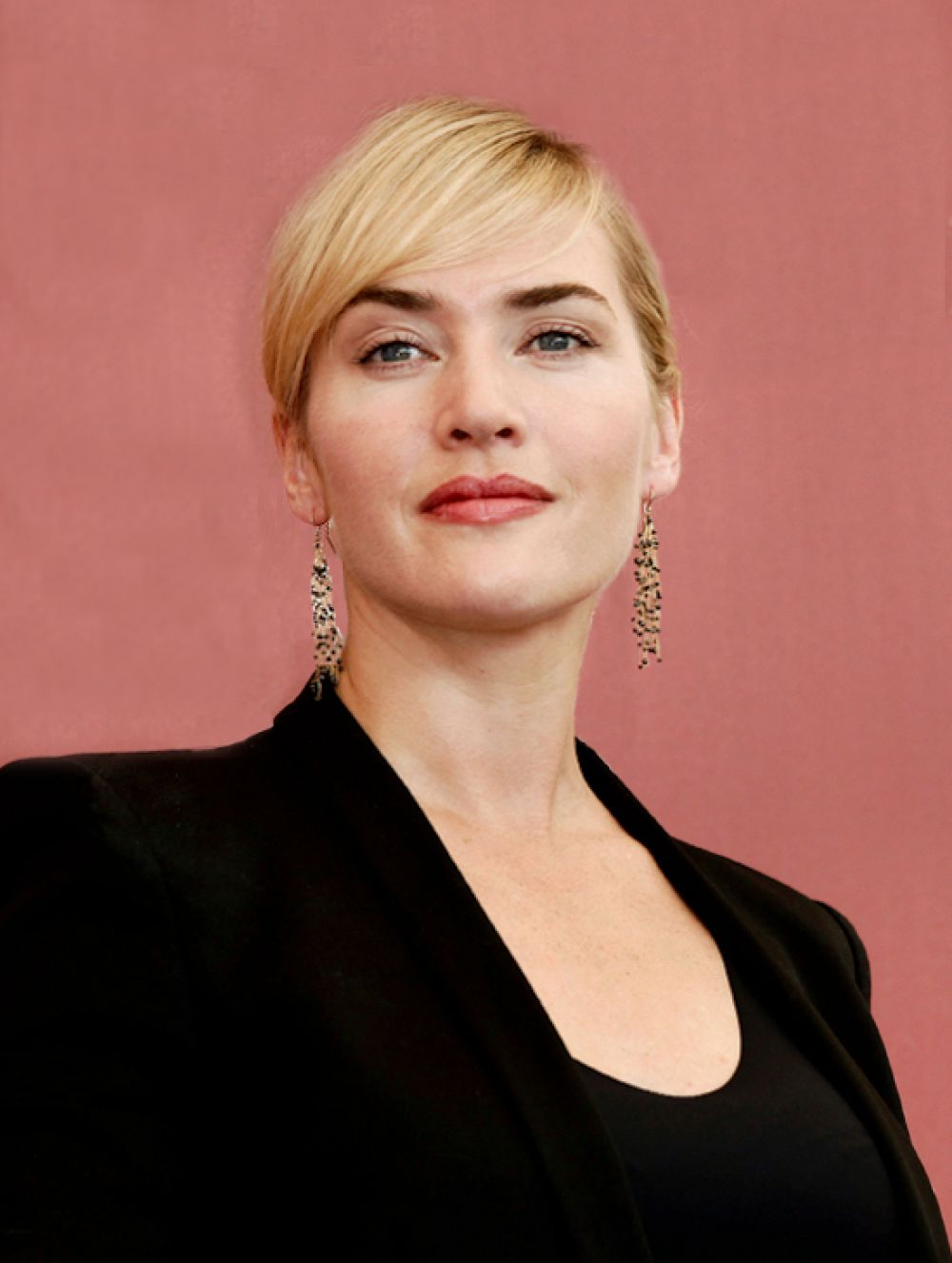
Kate Winslet has starred in a number of Hollywood films including Titanic (1997)

Many famous Directors have crossed the Atlantic to pursue a career in moviemaking. Alfred Hitchcock is perhaps the most notable British director in Hollywood, gaining his greatest prestige, and made the bulk of his most important pictures, in the United States, but numerous other British directors have found success in America, including: Richard Attenborough, John Boorman, Danny Boyle, Charlie Chaplin, Stephen Frears, David Lean, Sam Mendes, Anthony Minghella, Alan Parker, Carol Reed, John Schlesinger, Ridley Scott, Christopher Nolan and Tony Scott. American directors who have made their home in Britain include Tim Burton, Stanley Kubrick, and Joseph Losey.

For a period, three of the best known American superheroes were portrayed by Britons: Christian Bale as Batman, Andrew Garfield as Spider-Man, and Henry Cavill as Superman. Some actors, such as Sam Wanamaker permanently settled in Britain while others, such as Kevin Spacey, spent many years in the country.

Many other actors from the United Kingdom have achieved international fame and critical success, including;

- Charlie Chaplin (1889–1977)
- Stan Laurel (1890–1965)
- Ronald Colman (1891–1958)
- Cary Grant (1904–1986)
- John Gielgud (1904–2000)
- Laurence Olivier (1907–1989)
- Rex Harrison (1908–1990)
- James Mason (1909–1984)
- David Niven (1910–1983)
- Vivien Leigh (1913–1967)
- Anthony Quayle (1913–1989)
- Alec Guinness (1914–2000)
- Desmond Llewellyn (1914–1999)
- Kenneth More (1914–1982)
- Norman Wisdom (1915–2010)
- Olivia de Havilland (1916–2020)
- Michael Gough (1916–2011)
- Joan Fontaine (1917–2013)
- Donald Pleasence (1919–1995)
- Maureen O'Hara (1920–2015)
- Deborah Kerr (1921–2007)
- Christopher Lee (1922–2015)
- Denholm Elliott (1922–1992)
- Richard Attenborough (1923–2014)
- Glynis Johns (1923–2024)
- Richard Burton (1925–1984)
- Peter Sellers (1925–1980)
- Angela Lansbury (1925–2022)
- Roger Moore (1927–2017)
- Dame Patricia Routledge (1929–2025)
- Jean Simmons (1929–2010)
- Audrey Hepburn (1929–1993)
- Dame Joan Plowright (1929–2025)
- Sean Connery (1930–2020)
- Sally Ann Howes (1930–2021)
- Claire Bloom (1931–present)
- Richard Harris (1932–2002)
- Prunella Scales (1932–2025)
- Elizabeth Taylor (1932–2011)
- Peter O'Toole (1932–2013)
- Sir Michael Caine (1933–present)
- Dame Joan Collins (1933–present)
- Sylvia Syms (1934–2023)
- Dame Eileen Atkins (1934–present)
- Dame Maggie Smith (1934–2024)
- Dame Judi Dench (1934–present)
- Dudley Moore (1934–2002)
- Audrey Dalton (1934–present)
- Dame Julie Andrews (1935–present)
- Christina Pickles (1935–present)
- Glenda Jackson (1936–2023)
- Dame Vanessa Redgrave (1937–present)
- Albert Finney (1937–2019)
- Sir Anthony Hopkins (1937–present)
- Dame Diana Rigg (1938–2020)
- Sir Ian McKellen (1939–present)
- John Cleese (1939–present)
- John Hurt (1940–2017)
- Michael Gambon (1940–2023)
- Sir Patrick Stewart (1940–2026)
- Julie Christie (1940–present)
- Bob Hoskins (1940–2014)
- Ian McShane (1942–present)
- Eric Idle (1943–present)
- Lynn Redgrave (1943–2010)
- Ben Kingsley (1943–present)
- Dame Helen Mirren (1945–present)
- Hayley Mills (1946–present)
- Alan Rickman (1946–2016)
- Charlotte Rampling (1946–present)
- Timothy Dalton (1946–present)
- Pete Postlethwaite (1946–2011)
- Tim Curry (1946–2026)
- Jonathan Pryce (1947–present)
- Richard Griffiths (1947–2013)
- Jeremy Irons (1948–present)
- Jim Broadbent (1949–present)
- Dame Julie Walters (1950–present)
- Robbie Coltrane (1950–2022)
- Liam Neeson (1952–present)
- Pierce Brosnan (1953–present)
- Rowan Atkinson (1955–present)
- Ray Winstone (1957–present)
- Sir Daniel Day-Lewis (1957–present)
- Gary Oldman (1958–present)
- Dame Emma Thompson (1959–present)
- Sean Bean (1959–present)
- Mark Rylance (1960–present)
- Sir Kenneth Branagh (1960–present)
- Hugh Grant (1960–present)
- Colin Firth (1960–present)
- Kristin Scott-Thomas (1960–present)
- Tilda Swinton (1960–present)
- Robert Carlyle (1961–present)
- Graham McTavish (1961–present)
- Ralph Fiennes (1962–present)
- Clive Owen (1964–present)
- Alan Cumming (1965–present)
- Helena Bonham Carter (1966–present)
- Guy Pearce (1967–present)
- Rhys Ifans (1967–present)
- Jason Statham (1967–present)
- Daniel Craig (1968–present)
- Naomi Watts (1968–present)
- Catherine Zeta Jones (1969–present)
- Cate Blanchett (1969–present)
- Gerard Butler (1969–present)
- Minnie Driver (1970–present)
- Simon Pegg (1970–present)
- Rachel Weisz (1970–present)
- Sacha Baron Cohen (1971–present)
- Ewan McGregor (1971–present)
- Damian Lewis (1971–present)
- Jude Law (1972–present)
- Idris Elba (1972–present)
- Thandiwe Newton (1972–present)
- Kate Beckinsale (1973–present)
- Lena Headey (1973–present)
- Olivia Colman (1974–present)
- Christian Bale (1974–present)
- Kate Winslet (1975–present)
- Colin Farrell (1976–present)
- Benedict Cumberbatch (1976–present)
- Naomie Harris (1976–present)
- Orlando Bloom (1977–present)
- Tom Hardy (1977–present)
- Dominic Cooper (1978–present)
- James McAvoy (1979–present)
- Rosamund Pike (1979–present)
- Luke Evans (1979–present)
- Charlie Hunnam (1980–present)
- Tom Hiddleston (1981–present)
- Sienna Miller (1981–present)
- Eddie Redmayne (1982–present)
- Matt Smith (1982–present)
- Emily Blunt (1983–present)
- Henry Cavill (1983–present)
- Andrew Garfield (1983–present)
- Felicity Jones (1983–present)
- Claire Foy (1984–present)
- Keira Knightley (1985–present)
- Carey Mulligan (1985–present)
- Gemma Arterton (1986–present)
- Robert Pattinson (1986–present)
- Emilia Clarke (1986–present)
- Kit Harington (1986–present)
- Vanessa Kirby (1988–present)
- Taron Egerton (1989–present)
- Daniel Kaluuya (1989–present)
- Daniel Radcliffe (1989–present)
- Nicholas Hoult (1989–present)
- Emma Watson (1990–present)
- Dev Patel (1990–present)
- Jack O'Connell (1990–present)
- John Boyega (1992–present)
- Daisy Ridley (1992–present)
- Will Poulter (1993–present)
- Jodie Comer (1993–present)
- Florence Pugh (1996–present)
- Anya Taylor-Joy (1996–present)
- Tom Holland (1996–present)
- Ella Purnell (1996–present)
- Millie Bobby Brown (2004–present)

== American studios in Britain ==
The American studios have had their own production facilities and subsidiaries in the UK. Warner Bros. acquired Teddington Studios to produce 'quota quickies' around 1931. American production companies were required to invest in British product for their own films to be shown in the UK. Paramount-British Productions were formed in 1931 having leased facilities from Herbert Wilcox the previous year, and would continue (later using Pinewood) until the war. The earliest films made by Alexander Korda in Britain, before the foundation of London Films, were also released through Paramount. Other major American studios (Fox, Columbia and RKO) invested in British-made films through subsidiaries.

MGM-British was established just before the Second World War at Denham Studios, and produced four films there including Goodbye, Mr. Chips (1939). Revived after the war and based in Borehamwood, MGM-British was involved in producing films for over twenty years until the parent companies closure of the studio in 1970. For a time, after the war, Rank partly owned Universal-International, who distributed such films as Hamlet (1948) in the United States.

Warner Bros. once had shares in the Associated British Pictures Corporation, and eventually took a 50% share (with ABPC controlling the remainder) in domestic company Warner-Pathé Distributors from 1958. Warner withdrew its involvement in 1967. Meanwhile, Universal made 13 films in Britain during this period with limited box-office success and Paramount had a stake in such significant British films as Alfie (1966) and if.... (1968). After ABPC was sold to EMI in 1969, MGM formed a short-lived distribution partnership in 1970 with EMI which lasted until 1973. EMI formed a tripartite distribution arrangement with Warner and Columbia in 1978 under the name of Columbia-EMI-Warner. The Cannon Group, briefly took over EMI's share in 1986 (renamed as Columbia-Cannon-Warner) before the tripartite distribution arrangement was dissolved in 1988.

== British film industry's identity and Hollywood ==
The British film industry has a complex attitude to Hollywood. It has been argued that the size of the domestic British cinema market makes it impossible for the British film industry to successfully produce Hollywood-style blockbusters over a sustained period without U.S. involvement. American subsidiary Miramax took over Anthony Minghella's The English Patient (1996) when the production ran into difficulties during filming. Technically an American production, the film won 9 Oscars. Conversely, many films credited as American have been shot largely in the UK such as Prometheus, Star Wars: The Force Awakens and Guardians of the Galaxy.

"In film as in society at large, America’s influence has now reached levels and depths previously unimaginable," said critic Geoff Brown, referring to the Americanisation of British film culture in the 1990s. He cites as examples Hollywood coverage and the use of language in publications like Empire magazine, as well as dominance of big-budget American films in multiplexes, but he also notes that this is an industrial matter: The Full Monty was entirely financed and distributed by one of the American majors, Twentieth Century Fox, […] The praise went to Britain, but all the film’s profits went to America."

Conversely, BBC critic Mark Kermode believes that "the movie industries of Britain and America are inextricably intertwined", citing numerous examples of how Hollywood provides work to British production staff and studios, whilst Britain enables Hollywood to base their prestigious productions at British studios. He refers to British director Christopher Nolan’s The Dark Knight and Inception as British rather than as American films, and yet "when a movie which looks quintessentially ‘British’, such as The King's Speech, achieves equivalent success, everyone suddenly starts writing articles about the state of our national cinema as if it somehow exists in isolation." He agrees, nevertheless, that ‘the real problem’ is distribution rather than funding: "only a scant few secure the width of distribution that allows an extensive audience."

== See also ==
- British Academy Film Awards — annual film award show hosted by the British Academy of Film and Television Arts (BAFTA) to honour the best British and international film contributions.
- British Film Institute
- Cinema of the United Kingdom
- Cinema of the United States
- Independent cinema in the United Kingdom
- London in film
- List of Academy Award winners and nominees from Great Britain
