= Castle Cinema, Hackney =

Cinema in Hackney, London

Coordinates: 51°33′4.81″N 0°2′35.2″W

Castle Cinema
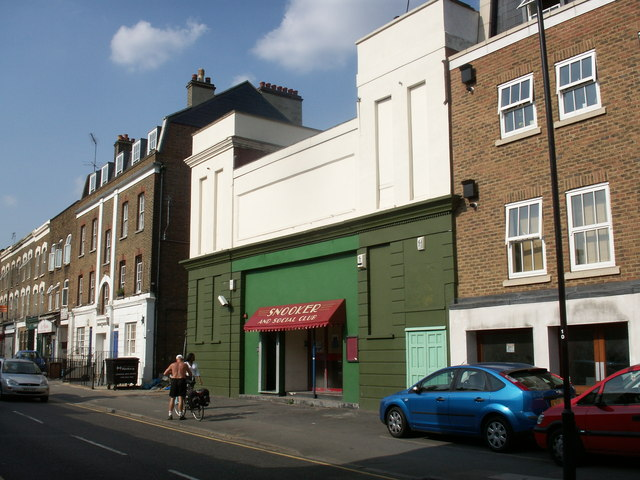
- The Castle Cinema - July 2006
- Interactive map of Castle Cinema
- Former names: The Castle Electric Theatre
- Address: 64-66 Brooksby's Walk, Hackney, London E9 6DA
- Capacity: 82 (screen 1), 27 (screen 2)
- Type: Indoor movie theater

Construction
- Opened: 8 September 1913

Website
- thecastlecinema.com

The Castle Cinema is an independent cinema based in the Homerton area of Hackney, London. The venue consists of an 82-seat main screen, a 27-seat secondary screen, as well as an Art Deco bar and restaurant that can accommodate up to 120 people.

It was first opened in 1913, being described as one of London's original cinemas and operated as such up until 1958, before being used for various other purposes.

A 2016 Kickstarter campaign successfully generated funding to renovate the building and reopen it as a working cinema, being officially launched to the public in February 2017.

== History ==
Initially under the name The Castle Electric Theatre, the cinema was opened on 8 September 1913 in Homerton, with a capacity of 619, predominantly in stalls, but including a small balcony area.

The cinema initially ran from 1913 to 1958, changing its operator various times. During this period, before ultimately closing on 24 May 1958, it had a final film exhibited being The Sad Sack.

The building was subsequently utilised for a wide range of businesses, including a glass factory, a bingo club, a storage warehouse, snooker club, convenience store and burger restaurant.

== Restoration ==
In 2016, a Kickstarter campaign to restore and reopen the Castle Cinema was launched by Asher Charman and Danielle Swift. The pair had previously seen success running pop-up cinema events such as the Hot Tub Cinema and the Pillow Cinema.

The campaign successfully gained support from over 650 people and generated 120% of the original fundraising goal, reaching a total of £57,000 raised.

Despite still retaining many original features such as a proscenium arch, curved ceiling and ornate plasterwork, the cinema required substantial renovation work as well as modern screening facilities.

Following test screenings in late December 2016, the cinema officially reopened its doors to the public on 3 February 2017 with an initial screening of La La Land.

A smaller second screen was later opened in February 2019, converting the former projection room.

Due to the COVID-19 pandemic the cinema was forced to shut its doors in 2020, before re-opening in May 2021 with the help of BFI's cultural recovery fund.

== Programming and events ==
The cinema predominantly shows new releases, but with an increased focus on independent films, foreign-language cinema, documentaries and other movies not always catered for in traditional multiplexes. They also screen live events and theatre.

As well their general programming, the Castle Cinema also runs inclusive screenings, as well as specialist events including:

- Pitchback Playback: Listening sessions for newly released and classic albums, staged in the dark.
- Ciné-Real: 16mm film screenings presented by projectionist Ümit Mesut and director Liam Saint-Pierre.
- No Bollocks Film Club: Specialising in acclaimed films from around the world.
- Autism-Friendly Screenings: Shown in a relaxed environment supported by trained staff, where patron movement and noise is allowed and lighting conditions and audio are made more accessible.
- Dementia-Friendly Screenings: Lower capacity screenings with relaxed rules, no advertising and adjusted lighting and volume for those with dementia and their carers.
- Parent and Baby Screenings: Exclusively for adults with babies under a year old to have the opportunity to see new releases in the cinema.
