= Ian Nairn =

British architectural writer and broadcaster (1930–1983)

- Born: 24 August 1930; Bedford, England
- Died: 14 August 1983 (aged 52)
- Resting place: Hanwell, London, England
- Education: University of Birmingham

Ian Douglas Nairn (24 August 1930 – 14 August 1983) was a British architectural critic who coined the word "Subtopia" to describe drab suburbs that look identical through unimaginative urban planning. He published two strongly personalised critiques of London and Paris, and collaborated with Nikolaus Pevsner, who considered his reports to be too subjective but acknowledged him as a better writer.

== Early life ==
Ian Nairn was born at 4 Milton Road, Bedford, England. Nairn's father was a draughtsman on the R101 airship programme based at Shortstown. The family moved in 1932 when the airship programme was terminated, and Nairn was brought up in Surrey. It was the balancing-act nature of this essentially suburban environment which he stated "produced a deep hatred of characterless buildings and places". Nairn had no formal architecture qualifications; he was a mathematics graduate from the University of Birmingham and served as a Royal Air Force pilot, flying Gloster Meteor aircraft.

== The Architectural Review and "Subtopia" ==
In 1955, Nairn established his reputation with a special issue of the Architectural Review called "Outrage" (later as a book in 1956), in which he coined the term "Subtopia" for the areas around cities that had in his view been failed by urban planning, losing their individuality and spirit of place. The book was based around a road trip Nairn took from the south to the north of Britain that led him to believe British architecture and urban landscapes would soon devolve into nearly-identical featureless suburbs. He also praised modernist urban developments such as the Bull Ring shopping centre in Birmingham, which became increasingly unpopular due to the subordination of pedestrians to cars and was demolished in the early 21st century.

Jonathan Glancey has compared Nairn's opinions with those of the town planner Thomas Sharp, as well as with earlier writers such as William Cobbett and John Ruskin, all of whom shared a vision of potentially invidious urbanization needing to be mitigated by clearly delineated rural space, "compact towns co-existing with a truly green countryside of which we are stewards, not consumers or despoilers". "Outrage" was followed by "Counter-Attack Against Subtopia" in 1956 (published as a book in 1957).

Both books were influential on Jane Jacobs, who was then working at Architectural Forum, the most widely read US architectural magazine. Jacobs cited "Outrage" and "Counter-Attack" in The Death and Life of Great American Cities, and she recommended Nairn to her contacts at the Rockefeller Foundation, which funded Nairn's book The American Landscape: A Critical View (1965).

== The Buildings of England ==
Nairn admired Sir Nikolaus Pevsner's work (if not his methodology) on the then fledgling Buildings of England series, and had approached Pevsner in the early 1960s as a potential co-author. Pevsner, who wrote about "Visual Planning and the Picturesque", was influential on the formation of the Architectural Review's "Townscape" series of columns, which evolved into the movement to which Gordon Cullen and Nairn were key contributors.

In common with several architectural writers and academics at the time, Nairn had already made small contributions to the series – in his case the volumes on Essex, Norfolk and Northumberland. Pevsner in turn had been influenced by Nairn in earlier volumes: Rutland, for example, Pevsner described as having "no 'subtopia'". Nonetheless, Pevsner was initially reluctant, having thus far written the guidebooks alone. He was also aware of Nairn's views on the 'house style' of the series from reviews Nairn had written on earlier volumes. However the scale of the project began to demand assistance and Pevsner eventually handed almost all responsibility for writing the Surrey volume to Nairn, whose text ultimately constituted nearly three quarters of the finished volume.

Pevsner was content to give sole authorship to Nairn for the volume on Sussex, but as work progressed Nairn felt that his approach was increasingly at odds with the relative objectivity Pevsner required. Nairn began to feel that this was acting as a constraint on his writing, and ceased work on the Sussex volume before it was completed. According to Pevsner, in the foreword to the Sussex book, "When he (Nairn) had completed West Sussex, he found that he could no longer bear to write the detailed descriptions which are essential in The Buildings of England. His decision filled me with sadness...." Consequently, the guide was published with Nairn being given credit for the West Sussex section and Pevsner East Sussex.

In the foreword to Sussex, Pevsner paid Nairn the compliment of acknowledging that "He writes better than I could ever hope to write." However, he continues: "On the other hand, those who want something a little more cataloguey and are fervently interested in mouldings and such like, may find my descriptions more to their liking."

This contrast between exhaustive description (Pevsner) and passionate, sometimes emotional, enthusiasm (Nairn) is noted by Alec Clifton-Taylor in his review of Sussex in the Listener on 15 July 1965. "Dr Pevsner... is inclined to tell us everything about a building except whether it is worth going to see. Mr Nairn, more subjective, occasionally perverse... never leaves us in any doubt about this aspect."

Despite these differences, Nairn remained enthusiastic about the series after his association with it had ended. He later wrote, "For architectural information, there is nothing to beat The Buildings of England...".

== Later career ==
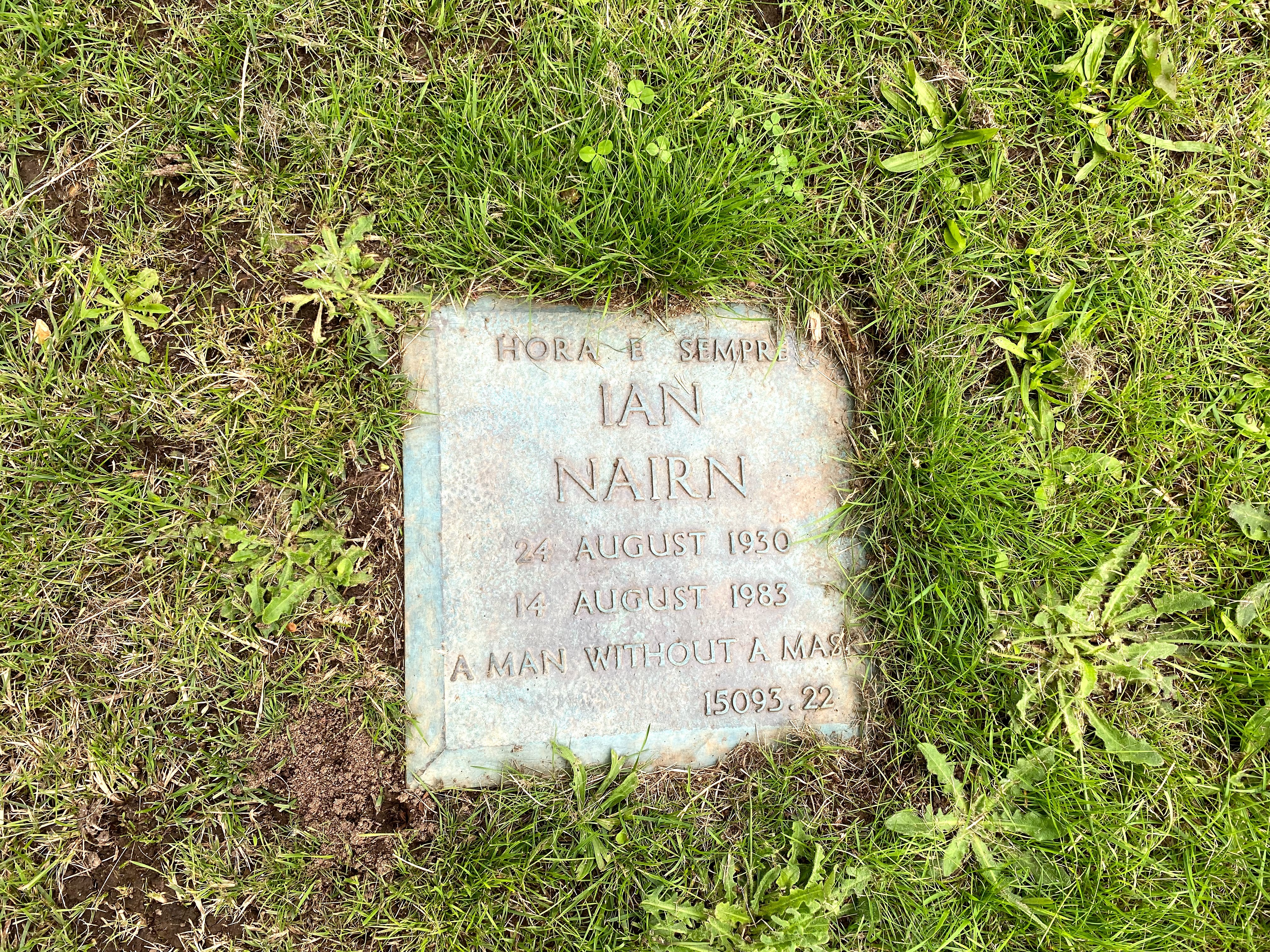
Nairn's grave in Hanwell

Nairn's style was more easily accommodated in his own architectural guidebooks, which he prefaced as being subjective and personal. Ultimately only two were ever published: Nairn's London (1966) and Nairn's Paris (1968). Planned guides to London's Countryside, The Industrial North, and Rome and Florence were announced but never appeared.

Nairn's writing style is concise, and often humorous, and he describes both his loves and hates, sometimes describing a passage between buildings rather than the buildings themselves, or a single detail. An example of the former is Cardinal Cap Alley on London's South Bank: he remarked of its vista of a tower of St. Paul's, "an accident, but the kind of accident that tends to bestow if you design well in the first place." And of the latter: an elephant on the Albert Memorial "has a backside just like a businessman scrambling under a restaurant table for his cheque-book".

In addition to his journalism, Nairn became for a time a familiar face on television, presenting various series called for the BBC, starting with Nairn's North in 1967 and concluding with Nairn's Journeys in 1978.

He was fond of pubs and beer, and both his architectural guides and television journalism are full of descriptions of pubs, and recommendations of which beers to drink. He said in 1972 of a recently disused signal box in Longtown, Cumberland, that he could imagine it being turned into a house, with the lever frames left in place and converted to beer pumps. This was part of his love of local and regional distinctiveness, the "ordinary" places which attracted him as much as the locations of noteworthy buildings. In Nairn's Paris, for example, he lovingly describes the village of Quevauvillers, near Amiens, whose few features are "all lying around waiting for nothing to happen".

In a similar vein, in the small town of Précy-sur-Oise near Beauvais, he notes "a collection of ordinary things ('wobbly suspension bridge...grain silo...a sign saying Ruberoid') transformed into uniqueness". (The reissued 2017 edition of Nairn's Paris omits these descriptions which appear in the chapters describing buildings in the wider Ile-de-France area such as Chartres, Reims and Beauvais céathedrals, the abbey church of Saint Martin des Bois, the town of Provins, several châteaux, and numerous hamlets and villages which Nairn deemed to be noteworthy, often, as in the case of Quevauvillers, because of their – for him – charming ordinariness).

When he did the Yorkshire section of Nairn's Journeys, he, in his own words, "bumped into" the great bluesman Champion Jack Dupree whilst doing a section of the programme in Halifax. The two got on rather well and maintained a close correspondence almost right up to his own death. In his concerns about the encroaching blandness of modern design, he was the heir of literary men who had similarly been critics of the spread of an Edwardian suburbia, such as E.M. Forster ("success was indistinguishable from failure" there), and John Betjeman ("red-brick rashes"), and which fed into the Campaign to Protect Rural England among others. This strain of thinking was, however, to become largely concerned with conservation of the heritage in affluent areas, rather than with Nairn's urban fringe. And like Betjeman, Nairn fought against the forces of subtopia, the obliteration of British heritage – though the forces of subtopia invariably prevailed; one example, his defence of Northampton's Emporium Arcade – "if they do pull this place down it'll be a diabolical shame." It was demolished in June 1972.

He died on 14 August 1983, aged 52, from cirrhosis of the liver and chronic alcoholism, four days before Pevsner himself died. Consumed with a sense of failure, he sought refuge in drink and in his later years wrote almost nothing. He is buried in the Victorian City of Westminster Cemetery, Hanwell in west London. It is now in one of Ealing's conservation areas. Speaking in The Man who Fought the Planners – The Story of Ian Nairn, Gillian Darley reveals that Nairn's death certificate erroneously gave the place of his birth as Newcastle upon Tyne. Although it is not known who supplied this information to the authorities, Darley reflects that it shows Nairn's wish to be considered a man of the North, a "Newcastle man by desire if not reality".

== Influence ==
Writers and critics influenced by Nairn include Jane Jacobs, J. G. Ballard, Will Self, Patrick Wright, Michael Bracewell, Jonathan Glancey, Iain Sinclair, Gavin Stamp, Owen Hatherley and Jonathan Meades, who said of his account of Surrey:

Mere architectural description could not suffice for that land of joke-oak and real rhododendron; what it demands is an acute sense of place and the gift to render that sense. Nairn possessed both, and in his London book he showed a third gift, that of the realization of the emotional power of townscape. That trinity of gifts made him a great poet of the metropolis.

In 1997 Michael Bracewell toured some of Nairn's subjects in Surrey for the Travels with Pevsner TV series. In the 2005 film Three Hours From Here Andrew Cross retraced the extensive journey across England that Nairn took to research and write Outrage in 1955. Jonathan Glancey undertook a similar odyssey for The Guardian in 2010.

Fourteen of the buildings mentioned in Nairn's London, "one of the most strange and stirring books ever written about the city", form the basis of the "Building London" chapter in Henry Eliot and Matt Lloyd-Rose's Curiocity (2016). Nairn's own descriptions of buildings such as St Mary Woolnoth, Battersea Power Station and the Granada Cinema, Tooting are incorporated into short paragraphs which update Nairn and invite contemporary readers to see the buildings for themselves. The chapter forms an affectionate homage to the "cantankerous architecture critic".

== Publications ==
- Outrage: On the Disfigurement of Town and Countryside (Architectural Review special 1955; book: 1959)
- Counter Attack Against Subtopia (1957)
- Your England and how to defend it: A cautionary guide (Introduction only, 1960)
- Surrey (1962) (with Nikolaus Pevsner), Yale University Press, 2 edition Revised and Enlarged (1971), ISBN 978-0300096750
- Modern Buildings in London (1964), London Transport
- Your England Revisited (1964)
- The American Landscape: A Critical View (1965)
- The Buildings of England: Sussex (1965) (with Nikolaus Pevsner), Yale University Press, ISBN 978-0-300-09677-4
- Nairn's London (1966), Penguin. Re-issued 1988 with updated entries by Peter Gasson, ISBN 978-0140092646. Original 1966 edition reprinted 2002 with introduction by Roger Ebert, ISBN 978-1585790449, and again 2014 with afterword by Gavin Stamp, ISBN 978-0141396156
- Britain's Changing Towns (1967). Re-issued as Nairn's Towns in 2013 by Notting Hill Editions with an introduction and updates by Owen Hatherley. ISBN 978-1-907903-81-6
- Nairn's Paris (1968), Penguin. Abridged text reissued in 2017 by Notting Hill Editions with an introduction by Andrew Hussey. ISBN 978-1-910749-49-4.
- Nairn's County Durham (2014). Re-issue of Architectural Review, February 1964.

== Filmography ==
Ian Nairn completed around 30 films for the BBC, all of which survive but none of which have yet been released on DVD.

The Ian Nairn episode of The Pacemakers which focuses on Churchill Gardens and Lillington Gardens in Pimlico, is available to watch on BFI Player under the foreign language series title No Two the Same. It's also available on YouTube.

The three-part series Nairn Across Britain is available to view in the UK on BBC iPlayer and BBC Archive.

Filmography (Note: Nairn's Travels, which the BBC released on BBC Two in 1990, is just a collection of 6 episodes from previous series' which they rebroadcast, not an actual series by itself. The 6 episodes are: From London to Lancashire from the series Nairn Across Britain (rebroadcast on 10 September 1990); Football Towns: Bolton and Preston from the series Nairn's Journey's (rebroadcast on 17 September 1990); Barnsley – St Niklaas (Belgium) from the series Nairn's Europe (rebroadcast on 24 September 1990); From Leeds into Scotland from the series Nairn Across Britain (rebroadcast on 1 October 1990); Orient Express from the series Nairn's Journey's (rebroadcast on 8 October 1990); Football Towns: Huddersfield and Halifax from the series Nairn's Journey's (rebroadcast on 15 October 1990))
Series Title	Series Year	Episode Title	Series and Episode Number	Role	Broadcast Date
Let's Imagine	1962	A New Look for Britain	Series 1 Episode 25	Guest	23 March 1962
Nairn's North	1967	The Glory That Was Bradford	Series 1 Episode 1	Presenter	24 October 1967
		The Magic of the Mersey	Series 1 Episode Unknown	Presenter	19 November 1967
		Wigan	Series 1 Episode Unknown	Presenter	Unknown
Release	1967–1969	This Story of Yours/The Euston Arch/Willem de Kooning	Series 2 Episode 14	The Euston Arch Segment Presenter	7 December 1968
Nairn at Large	1969	Dark Satanic Mills?	Series 1 Episode 1	Presenter	7 January 1969
		The Mersey Style	Series 1 Episode 2	Presenter	14 January 1969
		Cornish Pastures	Series 1 Episode 3	Presenter	21 January 1969
		...Yes, but would you want to live there?	Series 1 Episode 4	Presenter	28 January 1969
		The Poetry of Town Planning	Series 1 Episode 5	Presenter	4 February 1969
		They Don't Build 'em Like They Used To!	Series 1 Episode 6	Presenter	11 February 1969
Omnibus Presents	1967–2003	The More We Are Together: Eric Lyons – The Architect in Suburbia	Series 2 Episode 25	Locations Commentator	4 May 1969
The Pacemakers (Note: Also released as a foreign language version under the series name No Two the Same)	1968–1971	Ian Nairn	N/A	Presenter	1970
Nairn's Europe	1970	Hereford – Bourges (France)	Series 1 Episode 1	Presenter	30 April 1970
		Newcastle – Aarhus (Denmark)	Series 1 Episode 2	Presenter	7 May 1970
		Oxford – Padua	Series 1 Episode 3	Presenter	14 May 1970
		Inverness – Lulea (Sweden)	Series 1 Episode 4	Presenter	28 May 1970
		Barnsley – St Niklaas (Belgium)	Series 1 Episode 5	Presenter	23 July 1970
The Philpott File	1969–1980	Cities at the Breaking Point	Series 2 Episode 8	Panellist	28 November 1970
Nairn's Journeys	1971–1978	Cuckoo Clock Country?	Series 1 Episode 1	Presenter	8 July 1971
		South to the Med	Series 1 Episode 2	Presenter	15 July 1971
		With Good News from Ghent	Series 1 Episode 3	Presenter	29 July 1971
		Finding the Finns	Series 1 Episode 4	Presenter	5 August 1971
		Orient Express	Series 1 Episode 5	Presenter	12 August 1971
		Football Towns: Bolton and Preston	Series 2 Episode 1	Presenter	19 August 1975
		Football Towns: Huddersfield and Halifax	Series 2 Episode 2	Presenter	21 August 1975
		Football Towns: Wolverhampton and Walsall	Series 2 Episode 3	Presenter	22 August 1975
		Finding Follies: West of the Pennines	Series 3 Episode 1	Presenter	15 August 1978
		Finding Follies: Twixt London and Bristol	Series 3 Episode 2	Presenter	22 August 1978
		Finding Follies: Stourhead to the City	Series 3 Episode 3	Presenter	29 August 1978
Nairn Across Britain	1972	From London to Lancashire	Series 1 Episode 1	Presenter	14 September 1972
		Trans-Pennine Canal	Series 1 Episode 2	Presenter	21 September 1972
		From Leeds into Scotland	Series 1 Episode 3	Presenter	28 September 1972
All the Buildings Fit to Print	1974	N/A		Panellist	21 June 1974

Nairn also participated in a number of radio programmes including What's Your Pleasure? (1958) for the BBC Third Programme, with features on Trafalgar Square (with John Betjeman) and Wigan (with John Summerson).

== Notes and references ==
Notes
