= Nairn's London =

1966 book by British writer and architecture critic Ian Nairn

- Cover of 2014 reprint
- Author: Ian Nairn
- Language: English
- Publisher: Penguin Books
- Publication date: 1966 (reprinted 1967, 2002, and 2014 / revised ed. 1988)
- Publication place: United Kingdom
- Pages: 280
- ISBN: 0141396164
- OCLC: 1056014966

Nairn's London is a 1966 book about the architecture of London. It is authored by British writer Ian Nairn and this is the work for which he is the best known. Architecture critic Jonathan Meades has praised the work as an "imperious mongrel: part vade-mecum, part polemic, part poetic contemplation, part deflected autobiography and part conversation with himself – wholly original" and "the testament of a man steeped in London".

Nairn himself described it as a "personal list of the best things in London" and a "record of what has moved me between Uxbridge and Dagenham." Nairn's London drifted in and out of print in the decades following its publication but became a cult classic. It was regularly recommended by American film critic Roger Ebert to students seeking to improve their prose, and he wrote an introduction for the book in a 2002 printing. Ebert had to caveat his recommendation with an acknowledgement that it was, at that time, difficult to obtain a copy.

That relative scarcity continued until the 2010s, with high prices for second-hand copies. Since 2013, there has been a major revival of interest in Nairn and his work, leading to a 2014 reprinting of Nairn's London by the book's publisher, Penguin Books.

== Background ==
Ian Nairn was born in 1930 in Bedford, a town he would later claim to be the "most characterless county town in England". On his deathbed, at Cromwell Hospital in London, he told the doctors that he had been born in Newcastle.

He served in the RAF as a pilot and studied mathematics at Birmingham University. He later moved into architectural criticism, coining the influential term "subtopia" in the Architectural Review in 1955 to describe the drab failures of British town planning in the postwar period. That earned him considerable attention in the press. He also co-authored the magisterial Pevsner Architectural Guides for Surrey and Sussex. He worked with his second wife, Judy Perry, on the writing of the Surrey guide, and its dust cover noted that the "only way she could ensure the volume's appearance on time was to marry him." When Nairn's London was published, he had lived in London for less than ten years.

Nairn would also go on to host a series of BBC travel programmes around the UK. He wrote extensively on Paris as well, publishing a sequel to London in 1968.

Before writing his London, Nairn had earlier written a book about the modern architecture of the capital, Modern Buildings In London (1964). He was originally quite optimistic about the prospects of postwar modernism to positively reshape Britain's cities, but though the 1960s, his attitude became much more negative. He dismissed much recent architecture in a fiery 1966 article in The Observer as "a soggy, shoddy mass of half-digested clichés", leading to Lord Esher, then President of the Royal Institute of British Architects, to (unsuccessfully) call for his dismissal from that newspaper.

He died less than two decades after the publication of Nairn's London of alcoholism at the age of 53. The book contains almost 30 entries for pubs and a postscript on London's breweries. His favorite was Fuller's London Pride then sold primarily in West London.

== Contents ==
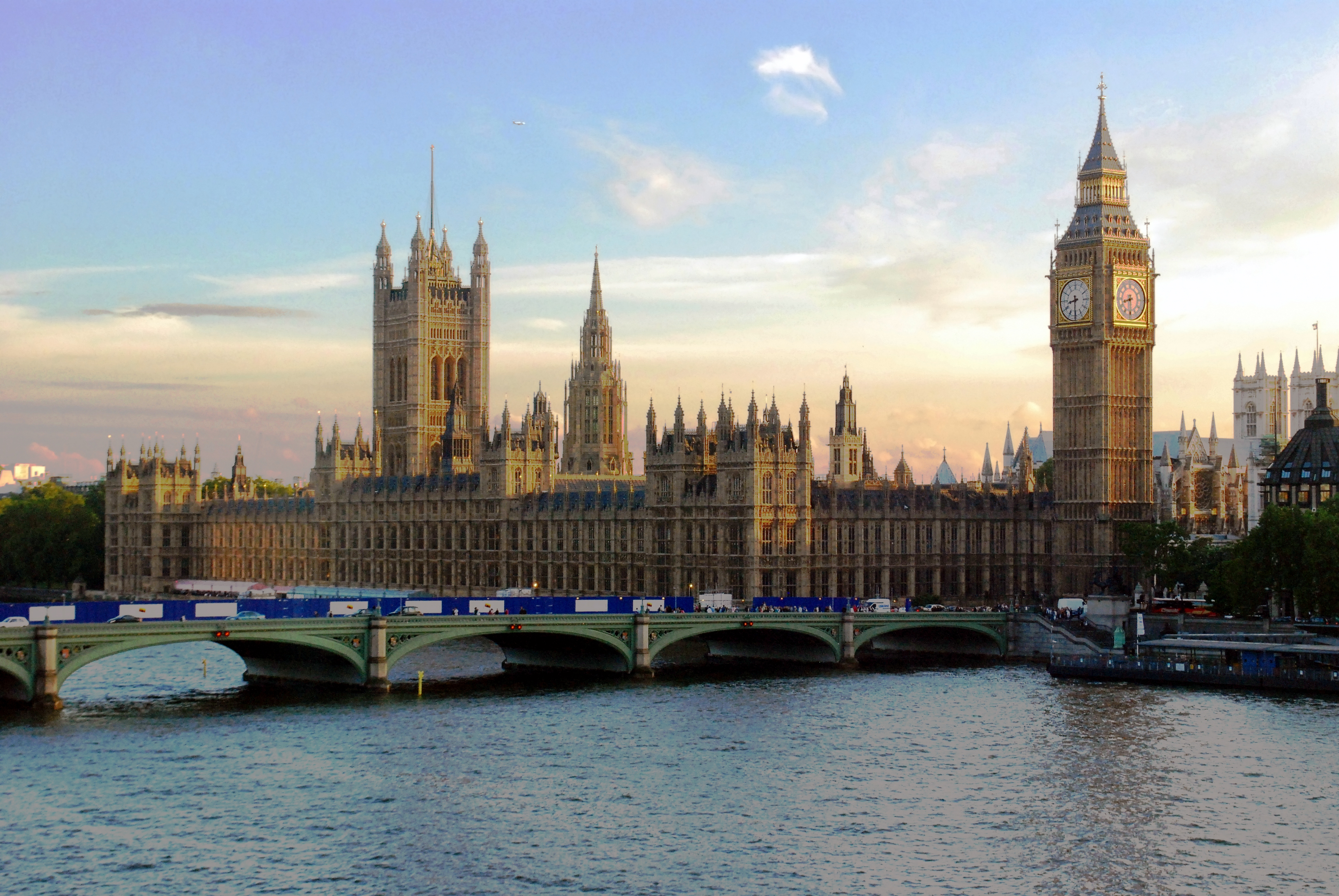
Palace of Westminster: "Stage scenery that takes itself seriously" (p. 57)

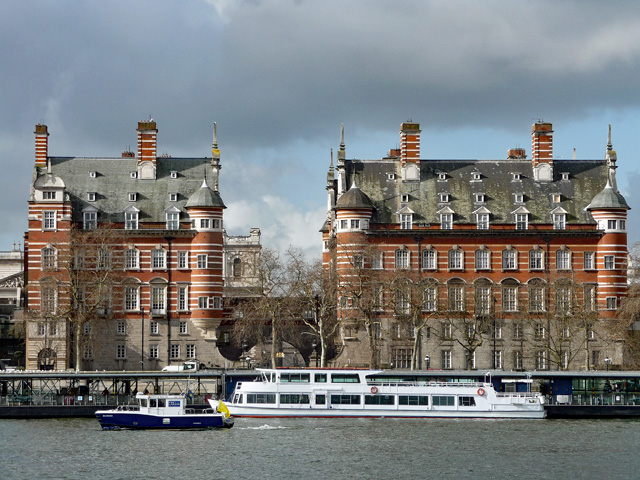
Scotland Yard: "Shaw's attempt at Vanbrughian grandeur has fallen flat, doomed from the start by his beefy heartlessness." (p. 63)

Just as topographical London is a vast 20-mile saucer of people with a rim of low hills, so human London is a central goulash with its rightful inhabitants forming an unfashionable rim.

The book is composed of 450 descriptions of various London buildings, including parish churches, pubs, office buildings, bridges, monuments, markets, monuments, homes, as well as traditional tourist draws. Nairn's London extends far beyond the urban core and stretches from Uxbridge to Dagenham, roughly corresponding to the borders of Greater London.

The book is divided into eleven sections:

1. City of London
2. Westminster
3. The Northern Ring: Paddington to Finsbury
4. South Bank
5. Kensington and Chelsea
6. Thames-Side West: Putney to Staines
7. East End and East London: Whitechapel to Romford
8. Thames-Side East: Deptford to Dagenham
9. South London: Battersea to Bromley
10. North London: Hampstead to Watford
11. West London: Kensal Green to London Airport

There are 89 black-and-white illustrations in the book, of which 82 were photographs taken by the author. The book was edited by David Thomson at Penguin Books. Entries are typically between a third to half of a page long, with the notable exception of the one on Westminster Abbey that covers twelve pages.

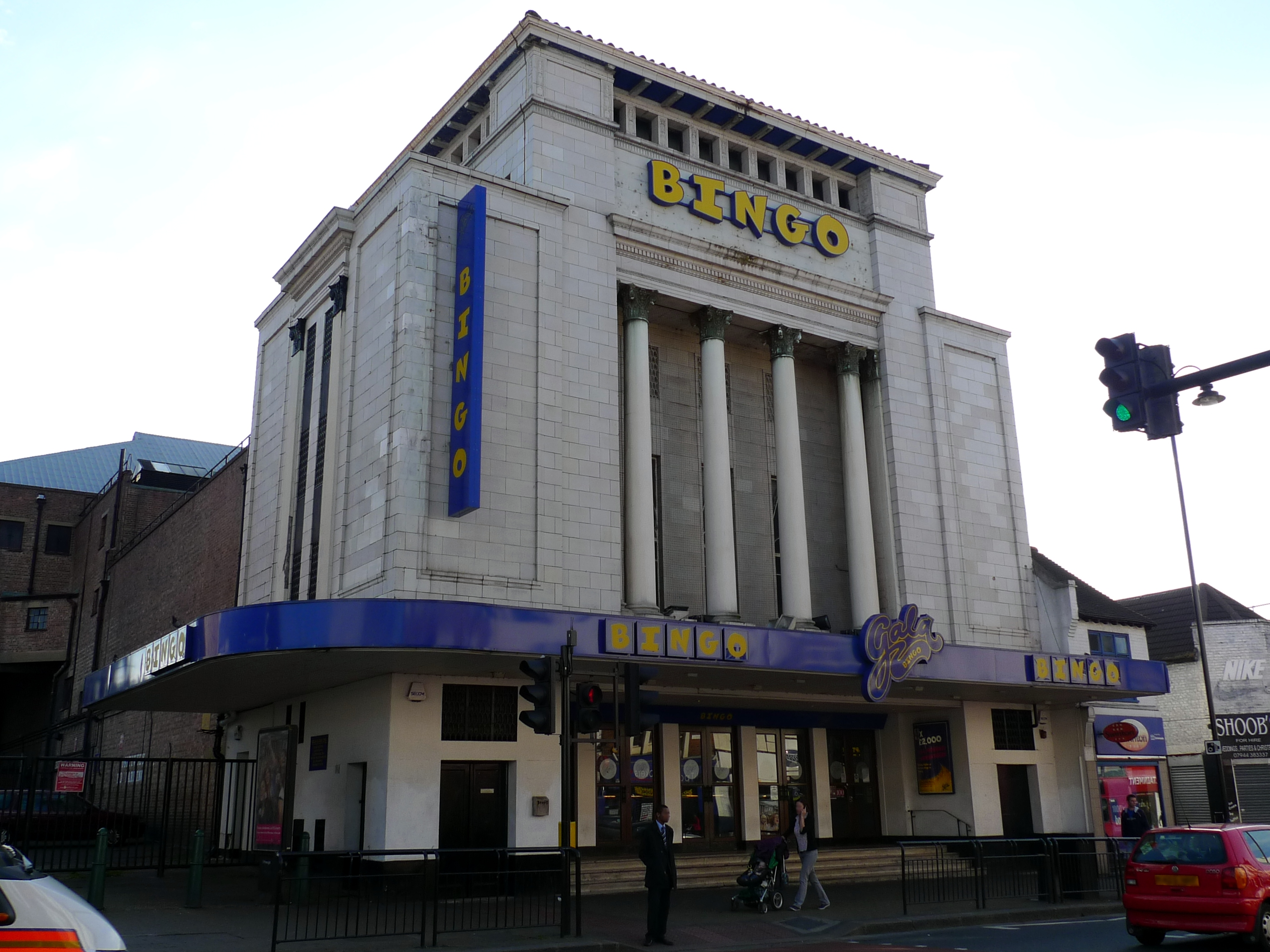
Granada Cinema, Tooting: "Miss the Tower of London, if you have to, but don't miss this." (p. 193)

The style is idiosyncratic. His entry on St George's, Bloomsbury, for example, does not actually focus on the Georgian church designed by Nicholas Hawksmoor. Instead it follows the course of the alleyway next to it that he argues, with six steps and a sharp corner, "has the drama of a full symphonic movement, charged up by the stupendous classical detail that bores a hole in your right flank". He noted that an elephant on the Albert Memorial has "a backside just like a businessman scrambling under a restaurant table for his cheque-book."

He particularly enjoys Sir John Soane's Museum which he terms "an experience to be had in London and nowhere else, worth travelling across a continent to see in the same way as the Sistine Chapel or the Isenheim altarpiece". The book is dedicated to Sir John Nash, as well as to his publisher, and he contends that the "generalized sense of the capital" is "almost entirely due to the genius of John Nash", singling out Regent's Park and Carlton House Terrace for particular praise.

The book is more mixed on postwar modernism. He writes appreciatively about the work of Denys Lasdun but is dismissive of the Loughborough Estate as an "arid geometrical exercise" and the Alton Estate in Roehampton as a place where the "eye of technique and elegance in individual buildings is wide open; the eye of understanding and feeling for a total place is firmly shut".

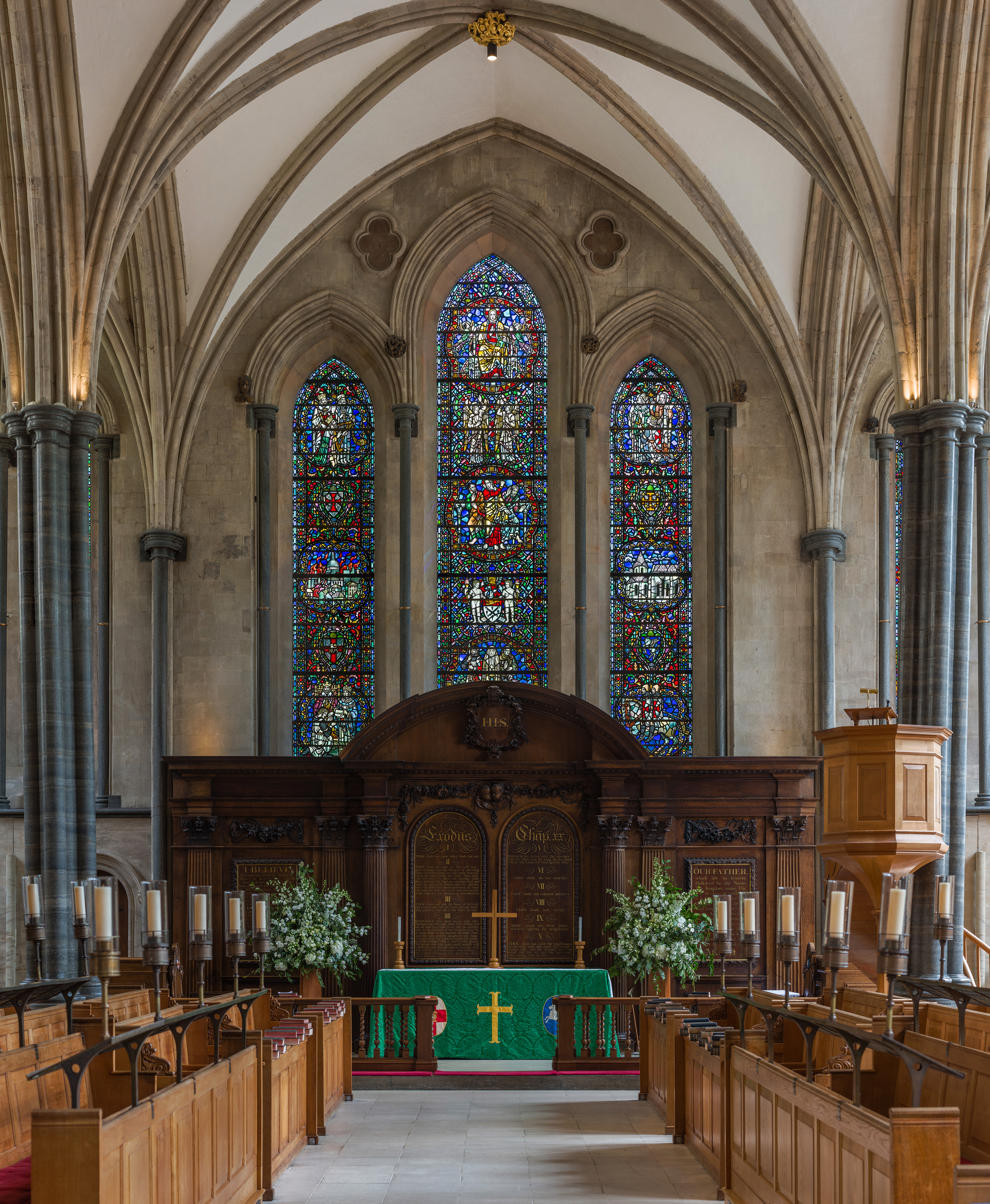
Temple Church: "London's Notre Dame and Sainte Chapelle rolled into one" (p. 92)

== Reception and legacy ==
As I explored London, Nairn in hand, there was something else I observed in addition to his acute eye and fierce passion. That was his prose style, somehow concise and expansive at the same time. He seemed to be standing beside me, chatting about the building we were both looking at, and yet when I looked at his entry with a writer's eye I was astonished to find how brief it might be, and how it did not seem to contain an unnecessary word.

— Roger Ebert

In the 1966 review of the book in The Guardian, Nairn is described as playing "the part of (yet another) enfant terrible of his profession" and being "of blood and, yes, guts, and beer, in full swing". That review goes on to say that the book was "necessary for all who love London, though they fall dead from apoplexy reading it", as Nairn attacks many of the capital's most respected buildings, including Bedford Square and Horse Guards Parade.

David McKie wrote in 2014 that the book's relatively obscurity until recently had much to do with London's transformations since the 1960s. He contended that the decision to not print any more copies was "no doubt on the bleakly practical calculation that London today is no longer Nairn's London"

In 2014, it was republished with identical text and typeface by Penguin to glowing reviews, with The Guardian writing that it was a "Horatian monument in words more lasting than bronze" and a "funny and poetic, highly subjective and slightly mad" depiction of the metropolis.

Rachel Cooke said it was the book she most wanted for Christmas 2014, saying it was the "best short book about the capital ever written". A 2017 review in The New Criterion said that it was a "a sort of bleary-eyed love letter to the buildings that define the city" and that it offered an alternative future for London.

Owen Hatherley has written that Nairn was "arguably the finest architectural writer of the twentieth century" and that Nairn's "masterpiece" was "a work of architectural criticism and architectural history of huge sophistication and erudition, a rum, bawdy, and drunken dance up a back alley, a hymn to those rare moments where the individual and the collective meet."

The book is regularly cited in disputes over planning and historic preservation in London, concerning everything from New Zealand House, East London shops, Canary Wharf, and gasometers.

== Publication history ==
The original 1966 edition was published in London by Penguin Books in 1966. It was later reprinted once in 1967 and again in 2002 and 2014. Roger Ebert wrote an introduction to the 2002 printing and Gavin Stamp wrote an afterword for the 2014 printing but the text of the book for both was otherwise unchanged. In 1988, Peter Gasson edited a new edition of the book, Nairn's London: Revisited for Penguin. That updated version contained more accurate locations for entries as well as updates on the buildings that had been renovated or demolished since 1966.
