= Geoffrey Scowcroft Fletcher =

Geoffrey Scowcroft Fletcher (1923–2004) was a British artist, art critic and London historian, and is best known for his 1962 book The London Nobody Knows.

== Career ==
Fletcher was born in Bolton, Lancashire and educated at the University of London and the Slade School of Art and won a scholarship from the British School at Rome. His drawings appeared in British newspapers such as The Guardian and The Sunday Times, and he worked for The Daily Telegraph, writing and illustrating a column, from 1962 to 1990. He used this medium to promote his drawings and texts about London, focusing on such mundane sights as gas lamps, Edwardian tea rooms, cast-iron lavatories and crumbling terraces. The term 'Geoffrey Fletcher London' is used to refer to his idiosyncratic descriptions.

Fletcher adapted his best-known work for the 1967 documentary film The London Nobody Knows, directed by Norman Cohen and featuring James Mason.

== Bibliography ==
- Town's Eye View (1960)
- The London Nobody Knows (1962)
- Popular Art in England (1962)
- City Sights (1963)
- London Overlooked (1964)
- London's River (1965)
- Pearly Kingdom (1965)
- Elements of Sketching (1966)
- Down Among The Meths Men (1966)
- Offbeat in London (1966)
- London's Pavement Pounders (1967)
- Sketch It In Colour (1967)
- Sketching In Colour (1968)
- Offbeat in the City of London (1968)
- Geoffrey Fletcher's London (1968)
- Changing London (1969)
- London After Dark (1969)
- Pocket Guide to Dickens' London (1969)
- The London Dickens Knew (1970)
- Sketching at Home and Abroad (Pitman Correspondence College) (1970)
- London Souvenirs (1973)
- Paint it Yourself in Oils (1973)
- Italian Impressions (1974)
- Paint it in Watercolour (1974)
- Sketch it in Black and White (1975)
- Figure and Portrait Drawing (1978)
- Portraits of London (1978)
- London At My Feet (1980)
- Beginner's Guide to Painting, Drawing and Sketching (1982)
- London: A Private View (1990)

== Personal papers ==
Islington Local History Centre holds artworks, sketchbooks and personal papers of Geoffrey Fletcher.

London Metropolitan Archives (https://www.cityoflondon.gov.uk/lma) have sketchbooks and artworks by Geoffrey Fletcher. Some of which can be seen on The London Picture Archive at: https://collage.cityoflondon.gov.uk/quick-search?q=geoffrey%20fletcher%20&WINID=1587640297184
