= Cine-variety =

Form of entertainment

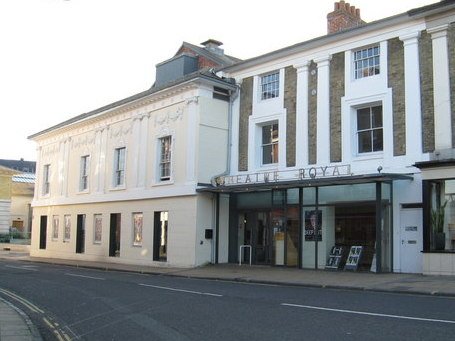
The Theatre Royal, Winchester, believed to be England's last surviving cine-variety theatre.

Cine-variety is a form of entertainment with a mix of variety acts performing in between the showing of films all for the price of one admission fee. It was popular in the United Kingdom and Ireland between 1900 and the 1930s. Cine-variety was used to keep stage comedians in work during the early days of silent films and talking films.

== History ==
From 1900 many of the first purpose-built cinemas had pianos, organs, and occasionally a small orchestra to accompany films. They also employed live acts on stage, along with the silent film. The types of acts that would be employed included comedy routines, acrobats, singers, entertainers and magicians. By the 1930s the cinema showing would usually include a feature film, a B movie, a trailer for the following week's show, a newsreel, a cartoon plus a full live stage show. Those in the show were often stars of film, radio, or variety theatre. Most of the cinema chains in the UK and Ireland employed stars for their cine-variety as part of the show. This included stars such as Cicely Courtneidge, Teddy Brown and Tommy Handley from the film Elstree Calling and Clapham and Dwyer, Claude Dampier, Ronald Frankau and Stanelli from the film Radio Parade of 1935.

== Legacy ==
Although cine-variety's heyday was in the 1930s, it continued through the 1950s with the shows at The Empire, Leicester Square, London. The Theatre Royal in Winchester is believed to be England's last surviving cine-variety theatre, and it also describes itself as "the only surviving cine-variety theatre in the country", it opened as a cine-variety theatre in 1914.

== See also ==
- Cinema of Ireland
- Cinema of the United Kingdom
- Theatre of Ireland
- Theatre of the United Kingdom
