= Independent cinema in the United Kingdom =

The United Kingdom has a well-established history of independent cinema exhibition dating from the 1930s and the Film Society Movement, which still exists as the British Federation of Film Societies. Since the 1980s, independent exhibition has thrived in regional film theatres set up under the auspices of the British Film Institute (BFI). The cinemas are linked to the Europa Cinemas network, which guarantees to promote at least 50% European titles, as well as to represent the history and diversity of British and world cinema.

The Independent Cinema Office (ICO) has comprehensive information for developers and owners of independent cinemas.

== Regional independent cinemas ==
Principal regional film theatres include:

- Broadway Cinema, Nottingham
- Chapter Arts Centre, Cardiff
- HOME, Manchester
- Edinburgh Filmhouse
- Foundation for Art and Creative Technology, Liverpool
- Glasgow Film Theatre
- National Media Museum, Bradford
- Queen's Film Theatre, Belfast
- Showroom Cinema, Sheffield
- Ultimate Picture Palace, Oxford
- Watershed, Bristol
- Tyneside Cinema, Newcastle upon Tyne

== London independent cinemas ==
Noteworthy independent cinemas in London include:

- Barbican Centre, Barbican Estate
- BFI Southbank, South Bank
- Castle Cinema, Hackney
- Deptford Cinema, Deptford
- Electric Cinema, Notting Hill
- Phoenix Cinema, Finchley
- Prince Charles Cinema, Soho
- Rich Mix, Shoreditch
- Rio Cinema, Dalston
- The Screen on the Green, Angel
- Theatreship, Canary Wharf

== See also ==
- British Film Institute
- Cinema of the United Kingdom
- Cinema of Northern Ireland
- Cinema of Scotland
- Cinema of Wales
- London in film
- UK cinema chains
