= The London Nobody Knows =

1967 British film by Norman Cohen

- Directed by: Norman Cohen
- Produced by: Norman Cohen
- Starring: James Mason
- Cinematography: Terry Maher
- Edited by: David Gilbert
- Production company: Norcon Film Productions
- Release date: 1967
- Running time: 53 minutes
- Country: United Kingdom
- Language: English

The London Nobody Knows is a 1967 British documentary film directed by Norman Cohen and starring James Mason. It was written by Geoffrey Fletcher based on his 1962 book of the same title, with Brian Comport credited for "additional material".

== Premise ==
James Mason conducts a tour through unfashionable areas of London, showing overlooked historical oddities which have escaped demolition, including Camden Town's Bedford Theatre, Islington's Chapel Market and the gentleman's lavatory at Holborn station.

== Cast ==
- James Mason as himself, narrator

== Reception ==
The Monthly Film Bulletin wrote: "James Mason acts as guide in this conducted tour through unfashionable and unswinging London, made by the director of Brendan Behan's Dublin. The emphasis is on the relics of a former age (mostly Victorian) that have survived the modern bulldozers: the gentlemen's lavatory at Holborn station with its elaborate, art nouveau iron fittings, the 'catacombs' beneath the Camden freight terminal. ... The result is compassionate but never sentimental, touching and amusing by turns."

Kine Weekly wrote: "People interested in people will find some of this film worth watching. ... Although it does dwell on aspects of London's architecture and interiors, it is far more concerned with Londoners. The title, however, claims more than it fulfils, though there are one or two quirky revelations. An unforced and crisp (but not always explanatory) commentary is finely spoken by James Mason as he wanders through the places visited."

In Film & History, Kevin Flanagan wrote: "Mason exudes the perfect demeanor for so strange a project. Part bemused gentleman, part-raconteur, and part engaged social reformer, he heads this tour (via on-camera narration and voice-over) around some of the most unsightly spots in the city. Focus tends toward architectural remnants and dead technologies, but the living, human significances remain key. ... With the exception of an almost slapstick send-up to the emergence of the mini-skirt, topics too readily associated with London's swinging side (indeed, in full 'swing' during the film's production) are absent, and focus is on the unlucky, the forgotten. ... This playful, associative logic showcases the film's unique qualities and continued relevance to students of British society of the 1960s, architectural and urban historians, and psychogeographers. "

In Sight and Sound Kate Stables wrote: "James Mason, armed with shiny brogues and a sardonic wit, is our guide around the near-vanished traces of Victorian London in Norman Cohen's engrossing 1960s short based on Geoffrey Fletcher's book of the same name. Rather than a Betjemanesque lament for the past, it displays a quirky, catch-all curiosity, as interested in the meths-swilling tramps of a Salvation Army hostel as in the crumbling plaster of Camden Town's once-vibrant Bedford Theatre, or the sooty Spitalfields yard where the Ripper abandoned victim number two."

Bob Stanley wrote in The Guardian: "No horseguards, no palaces, but Islington's Chapel Market, pie shops, and Spitalfields tenements. Carnaby chicks and chaps, the 1967 we have been led to remember, are shockingly juxtaposed with feral meths drinkers, filthy shoeless kids, squalid Victoriana. Camden Town still resembles the world of Walter Sickert. There is romance and adventure, but mostly there is malnourishment. London looks like a shithole."

== Home media ==
The flim was released on DVD by StudioCanal in 2008 paired with Les Bicyclettes De Belsize (1968).
