= Deputy lieutenant of Greater London =

British government officer

A deputy lieutenant of Greater London is commissioned by the Lord Lieutenant of Greater London.

Deputy lieutenants support the work of the lord-lieutenant. There can be several deputy lieutenants at any time, depending on the population of the county. Their appointment does not terminate with the changing of the lord-lieutenant, but they usually retire at age 75.

== 20th Century ==
- 23 May 1966: Sir Cyril Wilson Black
- 23 May 1966: Lieutenant-Colonel and Brevet Colonel Hugh Craig, OBE TD
- 23 May 1966: Lieutenant-Colonel and Brevet Colonel Frank Herbert Everingham, OBE TD
- 23 May 1966: Brigadier Sir George Steven Harvie-Watt, Bt QC TD
- 23 May 1966: Colonel (Honorary Brigadier) Harold Brian Jolly, OBE TD
- 23 May 1966: Honorary Lieutenant-Colonel Archer Frederick Leggett, OBE
- 23 May 1966: Colonel Sir Stuart Sidney Mallinson, CBE DSO MC
- 23 May 1966: Sir James Marshall
- 23 May 1966: Honorary Lieutenant-Colonel Basil Monk, MBE
- 23 May 1966: Major (Honorary Lieutenant-Colonel) The Rt. Hon. The Lord Rea, PC OBE
- 23 May 1966: Flight Lieutenant Sydney William Leonard Ripley
- 4 September 1967: Sir Harold Charles Shearman
- 8 November 1967: Henry Carlisle Wilson Bennetts, Esq.
- 8 November 1967: Captain Michael David Nevil Cobbold, CBE
- 8 November 1967: The Lord Constantine of Stanmore, CBE AE
- 8 November 1967: Lieutenant-Colonel Penry Lowick Cooper, TD
- 8 November 1967: Lieutenant-Colonel Hugh Llewelyn Daniel, TD
- 8 November 1967: Flying Officer Donald Alfred James Draper, Esq., DFC
- 8 November 1967: Colonel Peter Beaumont Earle, MC
- 8 November 1967: The Lord Fiske, CBE
- 8 November 1967: Lieutenant-Colonel and Brevet-Colonel Lewis McPherson Fordyce, TD
- 8 November 1967: Colonel Peter Walter Foster, OBE MC TD
- 8 November 1967: Colonel Martin John Grafton, OBE TD
- 8 November 1967: Captain Arthur Edward Chase Green, MBE TD
- 8 November 1967: Lieutenant-Colonel Henry Robert Hall, TD
- 8 November 1967: Lieutenant-Colonel Basil William Seymour Irwin, MC TD
- 8 November 1967: Colonel Edward George Aldred Kynaston, OBE TD
- 8 November 1967: Colonel Douglas John McLelland, CBE TD
- 8 November 1967: Harold Trevor Mote, Esq.
- 8 November 1967: Lieutenant-Colonel Cyril Howard Nice, TD
- 8 November 1967: Colonel Richard Edward Owen, OBE TD
- 8 November 1967: Rear Admiral Ronald Etridge Portlock, CB OBE
- 8 November 1967: Sir Percy Rugg
- 8 November 1967: Major Harold Charles Stewart, CBE
- 8 November 1967: John Barrett Turner, Esq.
- 8 November 1967: Major Robert Charles Watson, TD
- 8 November 1967: Brigadier Hamilton Edward Crosdill Weldon, CBE
- 8 November 1967: Willard Charles Williams, Esq., OBE
- 8 November 1967: Colonel Basil Reginald Wood, OBE TD
- 22 January 1969: Admiral Sir Charles Edward Madden, Bt GCB
- 19 May 1970: Lord Brayley, Esq., MC
- 19 May 1970: Rear Admiral Thomas Vallack Briggs, CB OBE
- 19 May 1970: Rear Admiral Bryan Cecil Durant, CB DSO DSC
- 19 May 1970: Arthur Desmond Herne Plummer, Esq., TD
- 19 May 1970: Air Commodore The Hon. Sir Peter Beckford Rutgers Vanneck, GBE CB AFC AE
- 11 November 1970: Lieutenant General Sir Geoffrey Charles Evans, KBE CB DSO**
- 7 February 1972: Colonel Derrick Brian Pullen, OBE TD
- 6 February 1973: The Rt. Hon. The Lord Boyd-Carpenter, PC
- 6 February 1973: R. P. Cave, Esq., MVO KCSG
- 6 February 1973: Colonel Earl of Avon, OBE TD
- 6 February 1973: Major A. W. Higgins, MBE MC TD
- 6 February 1973: Air Commodore W. I. C. Inness, CB OBE
- 6 February 1973: Major-General Sir Nigel Tapp, KBE CB DSO
- 6 February 1973: Colonel F. E. Wilkins, MBE TD
- 4 September 1973: Colonel John Alastair Dudgeon, MC TD
- 4 September 1973: Colonel N. C. Oswald, TD MC
- 4 September 1973: Lieutenant-Colonel J. C. T. Peddie, OBE MC
- 4 September 1973: Colonel G. R. A. Wixley, OBE TD
- 1 January 1977: Group Captain Sir Douglas Robert Steuart Bader, CBE DSO* DFC*
- 1 January 1977: Leonard Edward Rowan Bentall, Esq.
- 1 January 1977: Colonel Henry Leslie Clarke, MBE TD
- 1 January 1977: Commander David Laurence Cobb, CVO
- 1 January 1977: John Jacob Cohen, Esq.
- 1 January 1977: Lieutenant-Colonel George William D'Arcy, TD
- 1 January 1977: Captain Kenneth John Douglas-Morris
- 1 January 1977: Leslie Freeman, Esq., OBE
- 1 January 1977: Lieutenant-Colonel and Brevet Colonel James Samuel Haywood, RD
- 1 January 1977: Baroness Macleod of Borve
- 1 January 1977: Colonel Ronald Thomas Stewart Macpherson, CBE MC** TD
- 1 January 1977: Brevet Colonel Hugh Edward Maltby, TD
- 1 January 1977: Morgan Charles Garnet Man, Esq., CMG
- 1 January 1977: Major Sir Paul Henry Newall, TD
- 1 January 1977: Colonel Alan Frank Niekirk, TD
- 1 January 1977: Dennis Hayden Piper, Esq.
- 1 January 1977: Colonel James William Gordon Pine
- 1 January 1977, Raymond Pope, Esq.
- 1 January 1977, Gordon Ratman, Esq.
- 1 January 1977: Captain Barry St. George Austin Reed, CBE MC
- 1 January 1977: Lieutenant (Acting Colonel) Eric Anthony Ricketts
- 1 January 1977: Major-General James Alexander Rowland Robertson, CB CBE DSO*
- 1 January 1977: Rear-Admiral John Earl Scotland, CB DSC
- 1 January 1977, Colonel George Digby Thompson, MC TD
- 1 January 1977: Lieutenant Colonel (Honorary Colonel) Peter Harold Webber, VRD
- 1 January 1977: Arthur Wicks, Esq.
- 12 June 1978: Lawrence Bains, CBE
- 12 June 1978: Hugh Cubitt, CBE
- 12 June 1978: C. A. Prendergast
- 12 June 1978: R. T. J. Stone
- 12 June 1978: Group Captain Leonard Edward Robins, AE
- 12 June 1978: Captain P. S. Rees, RD
- 12 June 1978: Sir Kirby Laing
- 12 June 1978: Alastair Black, CBE
- 12 June 1978: D. F. W. Ford
- 30 June 1978: Sir James Swaffield, CBE RD
- 2 January 1980: S. Kershen
- 2 January 1980: Lieutenant-Colonel J. H. Hanscombe, MBE
- 2 January 1980: Colonel K. J. Grace, MC TD
- 2 January 1980: P. F. Corbett
- 2 January 1980: Commodore C. P. C. Noble, CBE DSC VRD
- 1 June 1981: Captain G. K. Beattie, RD
- 1 June 1981: J. R. French
- 1 June 1981: W. M. Taylor
- 1 June 1981: Brigadier Allan John Woolford, MC
- 1 July 1981: Major R. Berry, TD
- 1 July 1981: Lord Bowness, CBE
- 1 July 1981: Sir Ashley Bramall
- 1 July 1981: Sir Horace Walter Cutler, OBE
- 1 July 1981: Alexander Neeter, Esq.
- 11 August 1981: General Sir Hugh Beach, GBE KCB MC
- 18 January 1983: Major R. Blackford
- 18 January 1983: Colonel G. S. P. Carden, CBE TD
- 18 January 1983: Reg M. Fryer, Esq., ERD
- 18 January 1983: A. M. Goodhart, RD
- 18 January 1983: H. Haywood, Esq., OBE
- 18 January 1983: D. Jacobs, Esq.
- 18 January 1983: Air Commodore John Francis Langer, CBE AFC
- 18 January 1983: M. M. Lorek
- 18 January 1983: H. Shepherd, Esq.
- 18 January 1983: G. H. Sinclair, Esq.
- 18 January 1983: Major J. W. S. Telford
- 18 January 1983: Major J. A. Watson, ERD
- 17 April 1985: Colonel John Allan Dalrymple Anderson, TD
- 17 April 1985: C. Ashley, Esq.
- 17 April 1985: Colonel R. M. Cain, OBE
- 17 April 1985: Colonel J. M. Craig, TD
- 17 April 1985: Colonel A. E. Hall, TD
- 17 April 1985: Lieutenant Colonel P. G. Jones, TD
- 17 April 1985: T. S. Mallinson, Esq.
- 17 April 1985: P. Orchard-Lisle, Esq., TD
- 17 April 1985: D. M. Mason, OBE RD
- 17 April 1985: Colonel D. C. Part, OBE TD
- 17 April 1985: W. N. B. Richardson, Esq.
- 17 April 1985: Colonel Gordon Thomas Spate, OBE TD
- 17 April 1985: I. Spencer, Esq.
- 17 April 1985: R. A. Walters
- 10 September 1986: Major His Honour Judge P. T. S. Batterbury, TD
- 10 September 1986: Brigadier Peter Christopher Bowser, CBE
- 10 September 1986: R. J. L. Bramble, Esq.
- 10 September 1986: Niranjan Joseph De Silva Deva Aditya, Esq.
- 10 September 1986: B. H. Caesar-Gordon, Esq.
- 10 September 1986: H. Gould, Esq., OBE
- 10 September 1986: I. Harrington, Esq.
- 10 September 1986: J. N. Harrington, Esq.
- 10 September 1986: Group-Captain P. L. Harris, AE
- 10 September 1986: Major D. N. I. Pearce, CBE TD
- 10 September 1986: Brigadier B. C. Ridley
- 10 September 1986: Colonel Sir Greville Douglas Spratt, CBE GBE OStJ TD
- 10 September 1986: S. M. Springer, Esq., MBE
- 10 September 1986: M. F. Stonefrost, Esq., CBE
- 10 September 1986: Major General Michael John Hatley Walsh, CB CBE DSO KStJ
- 10 September 1986: D. E. E. Wood, Esq.
- 5 January 1987: Sir Frederick Howard Michael Craig-Cooper, Kt CBE TD
- 5 January 1987: Sir Alan David Greengross
- 1 July 1987: The Lord Rix, CBE
- 1 July 1987: Major Edwina Olwyn Coven, CBE
- 1 March 1988: John Hayter
- 1 March 1988: The Viscount Monckton of Brenchley
- 1 March 1988: The Lord Newall
- 1 March 1988: Dorothy Reynolds
- 1 March 1988: Colonel The Viscount Slim, OBE
- 1 March 1988: John Thomas Watford, OBE
- 21 April 1988: Sir Godfrey Taylor
- 13 May 1988: Lieutenant Colonel Michael Fox Low, RD
- 13 May 1988: Colonel Peter Ernest Williams, TD
- 28 June 1988: The Lord Pitt of Hampstead
- 28 June 1988: Lady Shirley Porter
- 13 October 1988: Professor Christopher Anthony Prendergast, CBE
- 24 April 1989: Richard Maddox Brew, Esq., CBE
- 24 April 1989: Sir Rodney George Brooke, CBE
- 24 April 1989: John Bull, Esq.
- 24 April 1989: Nicholas Hall Freeman, OBE
- 24 April 1989: David Miles, Esq.
- 2 February 1990: The Rt. Hon. Sir Frederic Mackarness Bennett
- 2 February 1990: Ernest Frederick Dunckley
- 2 February 1990: The Lady Williams of Elvel
- 5 June 1990: Anthony Francis William Powell
- 13 May 1991: Joan Wheeler-Bennet
- 1 July 1991: John Reid
- 16 September 1991: Peter Geoffrey Nathan, OBE
- 10 October 1991: Sir John Dellow, CBE
- 29 November 1991: Lieutenant Colonel Conrad Graham, OBE TD
- 12 February 1992: John Louis Brunei Cohen, OBE
- 12 February 1992: Derek Risien Fenton, MVO MBE
- 12 February 1992: Surgeon Captain Malcolm Neville Naylor, RD
- 15 April 1992: Lieutenant Colonel Paul Edgar Piggott
- 12 January 1993: Commodore Antony Dennis Barrett, CBE RD
- 12 January 1993: Colonel Neil Anthony Johnson, OBE TD
- 12 January 1993: Colonel Stephen Anthony Sellon, OBE TD
- 7 April 1993: Colonel Brian Andrew Kay, OBE TD
- 6 May 1993: Colonel John Holland
- 26 November 1993: Colonel Michael John Dudding, TD
- 2 June 1994: Air Vice-Marshal David Richard Hawkins, CB LVO MBE
- 2 June 1994: Chief Constable The Lord Imbert, CVO KStJ QPM
- 2 June 1994: Lucille Nemeth
- 2 June 1994: Lieutenant Colonel Robert John Redford
- 2 June 1994: Colonel P. R. H. Thompson, OBE TD
- 26 October 1994: Commander J. McK. Ludgate, RD
- 26 October 1994: Colonel Ian William Bernard McRobbie, OBE TD
- 26 October 1994: Colonel C. H. Martin, OBE TD
- 21 March 1995: Air Commodore B. B. Batt
- 21 March 1995: Patrick J. O'Brien Esquire, TD
- 31 May 1995: George Bodin, Esq.
- 21 June 1995: Brigadier A. K. Crawford, CBE
- 21 June 1995: Angela Hooper, CBE
- 30 January 1996: Anthony Charles Everett, Esq., LVO OBE
- 30 January 1996: John Trotter, Esq.
- 19 June 1996: Brigadier P. E. Woolley, OBE
- 12 September 1996: Colonel Stephen Peter Foakes, TD
- 15 October 1996: The Earl Cadogan, KBE
- 15 October 1996: Brigadier Christopher James Marchant Smith, CBE
- 7 April 1997: Major Barnaby Cockcroft
- 7 April 1997: Air Vice-Marshal Clive Evans
- 7 April 1997: Colonel Geoffrey Godbold, OBE
- 26 September 1997: Major-General Peter Walter Ernest Istead, CB OBE GM
- 15 October 1997: Major Charles Jeffrey Winstanley, TD
- 6 January 1998: Lieutenant Colonel Roderick Edmund Forbes Morriss, OBE
- 6 January 1998: Jenny Bianco
- 14 September 1998: Major Rosemary Grace Warne, MBE
- 29 September 1998: Colonel Cyril John Young, TD
- 12 November 1998: Dame Prudence Margaret Leith, DBE
- 9 July 1999: Leonard Edward Bentall, Esq.
- 9 July 1999: Dr. Charles Goodson-Wickes
- 9 July 1999: Robert Nicholas Philipson-Stow, Esq.
- 9 July 1999: Anthony James Speed, Esq., CBE QPM
- 9 July 1999: Major-General Timothy Patrick Toyne Sewell
- 9 July 1999: Paula Ann Nugent Vokes, RD

== 21st Century ==
- 14 January 2000: Major David Hewer, OBE TD
- 4 August 2000: George Gordon-Smith, MVO
- 19 September 2000: Bozena Laskiewicz
- 16 May 2001: The Lord Lingfield, Kt
- 16 May 2001: Michael Brahams
- 16 May 2001: Major Kevin Traverse Healy
- 16 May 2001: Richard Walker-Arnott, Esq.
- 24 September 2001: Malcolm Peter Speight Barton, Esq.
- 24 September 2001: The Lord Bilimoria, CBE
- 24 September 2001: Paul Cautley, CMG OBE
- 24 September 2001: Colonel Peter Charles Cook
- 24 September 2001: Lieutenant Colonel Robert W. Murfin, TD
- 24 September 2001: Lieutenant Colonel Robert Barry Paddison, MBE
- 24 September 2001: The Lord Stevens of Kirkwhelpington, KStJ QPM
- 24 September 2001: Clare Whelan, OBE
- 5 June 2002: Andrew Henry Scott, Esq.
- 9 December 2002: Captain Robert Graeme Avis, OBE RD
- 9 December 2002: Adrian Francis Patrick Barnes, CVO
- 9 December 2002: Wing Commander Edna Felicity Partridge, OBE AE
- 9 December 2002: Colonel Piers Atherley David Storie-Pugh, OBE TD
- 19 December 2003: Admiral The Lord Boyce, KG GCB OBE
- 19 December 2003: Brigadier Anthony Peter Verey, QVRM TD
- 17 May 2004: Major Antony Richard O’Hagan, TD
- 1 March 2005: Sir Christopher John Benson, OAM
- 31 May 2006: Robert Jonathan Davis, MBE
- 31 May 2006: Commissioner Sir Kenneth John Knight, CBE QFSM
- 31 May 2006: General Sir Jeremy John George Mackenzie, GCB OBE
- 31 May 2006: Mei Sim Lei, OBE
- 31 May 2006: Martin Henry Charles Russell
- 24 October 2006: Graham Eustance, OBE
- 24 October 2006: Robert Leader
- 24 October 2006: Sir Trevor McDonald, OBE
- 6 February 2007: Major Jeremy Fern, TD
- 6 February 2007: John Purnell, GM QPM
- 26 April 2007: The Lord Hameed, CBE
- 15 November 2007: Wing Commander Michael Greville Dudgeon, OBE
- 15 November 2007: Chief Constable Sir William Ian Ridley Johnston, CBE QPM
- 15 November 2007: Dr. Paul Anthony Knapman
- 15 November 2007: General The Lord Walker of Aldringham, GCB CMG CBE
- 28 July 2008: Colonel Jane Davis, OBE QVRM TD
- 10 December 2008: John Barber, Esq.
- 10 December 2008: Baroness Benjamin, DBE
- 10 December 2008: Simon Duckworth
- 10 December 2008: Colonel Hugh Purcell, OBE
- 10 December 2008: Cyrus Todiwala, OBE
- 6 July 2009: Katharine Brock, CBE LVO
- 6 July 2009: Rosemary Jill Prescott
- 21 December 2009: Colonel Paul Willum Acda,
- 21 December 2009: Colonel Markham Patrick Bryant
- 21 December 2009: David Alan Ezra Dangoor, CBE
- 21 December 2009: Sir Paul Joseph Patrick Grant
- 21 December 2009: Bruce Fiddes Houlder, CB
- 21 December 2009: Paul Malcolm Kennerley, RD
- 21 December 2009: Kathryn Alexandra McDowell, CBE
- 21 December 2009: The Reverend Nims Obunge, MBE
- 5 May 2010: Colonel Ewen Gordon Cameron, TD
- 30 June 2010: General The Lord Dannatt, GCB CBE MC
- 5 November 2010: Sandra Diane Cahill
- 31 March 2011: Lady Elizabeth Arnold
- 31 March 2011: Ian Edward Barlow, Esq.
- 31 March 2011: Lieutenant Colonel Nicholas John Pierce Brunt
- 31 March 2011: Major Christopher Harold Alexander Goodwin, TD
- 31 March 2011: Maureen Gordon
- 31 March 2011: Major General Sir Iain Charles Mackay-Dick, KCVO MBE
- 31 March 2011: Anton Mosimann, OBE
- 31 March 2011: Maria Famlayo Pedro
- 31 March 2011: The Reverend Canon Flora Jane Louise Winfield
- 31 March 2011: Roxane Zand
- 9 October 2012: Barry George Albin-Dyer, OBE
- 9 October 2012: Major General Alastair Bruce of Crionaich, OBE KStJ VR
- 9 October 2012: The Hon. Edward Charles Cadogan, Viscount Chelsea
- 9 October 2012: Rupert Andrew Woodward Goodman
- 9 October 2012: Nitesh Gor, OBE
- 9 October 2012: Pieter van der Merwe, MBE
- 9 October 2012: Major John Francis Meadows Rodwell
- 26 April 2014: Captain Peter Alan Baker, RD
- 26 April 2014: Ann Elizabeth Cable, MBE DStJ
- 26 April 2014: Richard Kornicki, Esq., CBE
- 26 April 2014: Nusrat Mehboob Lilani, CBE
- 26 April 2014: Leslie Morgan, OBE
- 26 April 2014: The Reverend Canon David Reindorp, TD
- 22 May 2014: Thomas Chan, Esq.
- 6 March 2015: Bruce Carnegie-Brown
- 6 March 2015: Colleen Lorraine Harris, MVO
- 6 March 2015: David Christopher Fraser Jones
- 6 March 2015: Vice Admiral Sir Adrian James Johns, KCB CBE
- 6 March 2015: Dr. Mary-Clare Parker
- 6 March 2015: Professor David Andrew Phoenix, OBE
- 30 April 2015: Kevin David McGrath, OBE
- 9 March 2016: Dr Tariq Abbasi, MBE
- 9 March 2016: Dr Mustafa Abu-Lisan
- 9 March 2016: Sir William Atkinson
- 9 March 2016: Commander John Herriman
- 9 March 2016: Michael Messinger, LVO QPM
- 9 March 2016: Bushra Nasir, CBE
- 9 March 2016: Dame Catherine Fiona Woolf, DBE DStJ
- 21 July 2016: Dr. Muhammad Abdul Bari, MBE
- 21 July 2016: Michael Thomas Brace, CBE
- 21 July 2016: Dr. David Haylett Easton
- 21 July 2016: Dr. Sheila Jeanne Gewolb
- 21 July 2016: Gillian Collins Norton
- 21 July 2016: Justin James Packshaw, MBE
- 21 July 2016: Babulal Sethia
- 4 September 2017: Sir Michael Dixon, KBE
- 4 September 2017: Stephen Howlett, CBE
- 4 September 2017: Avril McIntyre, MBE
- 4 September 2017: Christopher Muttukumaru, CB
- 4 September 2017: Ian Pittaway
- 28 November 2017: The Reverend Martin Hislop
- 28 November 2017: General The Rt. Hon. The Lord Houghton of Richmond, GCB CBE
- 28 November 2017: Chief Superintendent Simon Ovens
- 13 June 2018: Sir Steve Bullock
- 13 June 2018: Christopher Cotton
- 13 June 2018: Colonel Raymond Wilkinson, QVRM TD VR
- 8 January 2019: Nicholas Bracken, OBE
- 8 January 2019: The Reverend Lesley Goldsmith
- 8 January 2019: Martin Griffiths, CBE
- 8 January 2019: Surgeon Commodore Robin McNeill Love, OStJ
- 8 January 2019: Air Vice-Marshal Ranald Torquil Ian Munro, CBE TD VR
- 18 June 2019: General Sir Adrian John Bradshaw, KCB OBE
- 18 June 2019: Kim Bromley-Derry, CBE
- 18 June 2019: Patrick Edwards
- 18 June 2019: Major David Kemmis Betty, MBE
- 18 June 2019: Professor Paul Palmer
- 18 June 2019: Stuart James Shilson, LVO
- 18 June 2019: Professor Geoffrey Thompson, MBE
- 18 June 2019: Sandra Wagg
- 15 February 2022: Elizabeth Balgobin
- 15 February 2022: Dr. Rej Bhumbra
- 15 February 2022: Lynn Cooper
- 15 February 2022: Anthony Griffiths
- 15 February 2022: Craig Haslam
- 15 February 2022: Paul Herbage, MBE
- 15 February 2022: Louise Ireland
- 15 February 2022: Bibi Khan, MBE
- 15 February 2022: Alderman Alastair King
- 15 February 2022: Randeep Lall
- 15 February 2022: Simon Murrells
- 15 February 2022: Gareth Elwin Neame, OBE
- 15 February 2022: Major General Marc Overton, TD VR
- 15 February 2022: Andrew Ranson, VR
- 15 February 2022: Manjit Singh
- 15 February 2022: Thelma Stober
- 15 February 2022: Dr. Yvonne Thompson, CBE
- 15 February 2022: Christopher Wellbelove
- 11 October 2022: Brigadier Patrick Davidson-Houston, CBE
- 11 October 2022: Pablo Blackwood
- 11 October 2022: Matthew Burrow
- 11 October 2022: Ian Dyson, QPM
- 11 October 2022: Himanshu Jain
- 11 October 2022: Manju Malhi, BEM
- 11 October 2022: Geraldine Norris
- 11 October 2022: David Utting
- 11 October 2022: Major Richard Wilson, MBE
- 11 October 2022: Patricia Windsor, MVO
- 11 October 2022: YolanDa Brown
