= County Championship =

Cricket league in England

- Countries: England and Wales
- Administrator: England and Wales Cricket Board
- Format: First-class
- First edition: 1890
- Latest edition: 2026
- Next edition: 2027
- Tournament format: Two divisions; home and away 4-day fixtures
- Number of teams: 18
- Current champion: Warwickshire (9 titles)
- Most successful: Yorkshire (33 titles including 1 shared)
- Most runs: Phil Mead (46,268)
- Most wickets: Tich Freeman (3,151)
- 2026 County Championship

The County Championship is a first-class cricket competition in England and Wales. Established in 1890 and organised by the England and Wales Cricket Board (ECB), it is the world's oldest domestic cricket tournament. The tournament is contested by 18 clubs, representing 17 of the historic counties of England and one from Wales. The reigning champions are Warwickshire

The earliest known inter-county cricket match was played in 1709. Until 1889, the concept of an unofficial county championship existed, whereby various claims would be made by or on behalf of a particular club as the "Champion County", an archaic term which now has the specific meaning of a claimant for the unofficial title prior to 1890. In contrast, the term "County Champions" applies in common parlance to a team that has won the official title. The most usual means of claiming the unofficial title was by popular or press acclaim. In the majority of cases, the claim or proclamation was retrospective, often by cricket writers using reverse analysis via a study of known results. The unofficial title was not proclaimed in every season up to 1889, because in many cases there were not enough matches or there was simply no clear candidate. Having already been badly hit by the Seven Years' War, county cricket ceased altogether during the Napoleonic Wars and there was a period from 1797 to 1824 during which no inter-county matches took place. The concept of the unofficial title has been utilised ad hoc and relied on sufficient interest being shown.

The official County Championship was constituted on 16 December 1889, when secretaries of the major clubs gathered at Lord's to decide the following season's fixtures. Simultaneously, representatives of the eight leading counties met privately to determine how teams would be ranked. The new competition began in the 1890 season and at first involved just the eight leading clubs: Gloucestershire, Kent, Lancashire, Middlesex, Nottinghamshire, Surrey, Sussex and Yorkshire. Subsequently, the championship has been expanded to 18 clubs by the additions at various times of Derbyshire, Durham, Essex, Glamorgan, Hampshire, Leicestershire, Northamptonshire, Somerset, Warwickshire and Worcestershire. Counties without first-class status compete in the National Counties Cricket Championship.

== History ==
=== Origin of concept ===
It is difficult to know when the concept of a county championship originated. While early matches were often between teams named after counties, they were not the club teams the usage would imply today. Rowland Bowen states in his history that the earliest usage of the term "County Championship" occurred in 1837 re a match between Kent and Nottingham Cricket Club which for the purposes of that match was called Nottinghamshire. That may be so re the actual terminology but closer examination of the sources does indicate a much earlier expression of the idea.

The earliest known inter-county match was in 1709 between Kent and Surrey but match results are unknown until the 1720s. The first time a source refers to the superiority of one county is in respect of a match between Edwin Stead's XI from Kent and Sir William Gage's XI from Sussex at Penshurst Park in August 1728. Stead's team won by an unknown margin and the source states that "this was the third time this summer that the Kent men have been too expert for those of Sussex". The following year, Gage's team "turned the scales" and defeated Stead's team, prompting a source to remark that "(the scale of victory) for some years past has been generally on the Kentish side". In 1730, a newspaper referred to the "Kentish champions".

These statements indicate that inter-county matches had been played for many years previously and that there was keen rivalry with each team seeking ascendancy.

=== Development of county cricket ===
Inter-county cricket was popular throughout the 18th century although the best team, such as Kent in the 1740s or Hampshire in the days of the Hambledon Club, was usually acknowledged as such by being matched against an "All England" team. There were a number of contemporary allusions to the best county including some in verse, such as one by a Kent supporter celebrating a victory over Hampshire in terms of "(we shall) bring down the pride of the Hambledon Club".

Analysis of 18th century matches has identified a number of strong teams who actually or effectively proclaimed their temporal superiority. The most successful county teams were Hampshire, Kent, Middlesex, Surrey and Sussex. But there was often a crossover between town and county with some strong local clubs tending at times to represent a whole county. Examples are London, which often played against county teams and was in some respects almost a county club in itself; Slindon, which was for a few years in the 1740s effectively representative of Sussex as a county; Dartford, often representative of Kent; and the Hambledon Club, certainly representative of Hampshire and also perhaps of Sussex. Other good county teams in the 18th century were Berkshire, Essex and Middlesex.

Using the same sort of reverse analysis, it is possible to compile a list of the most competitive teams from the recommencement of county cricket in 1825. Rowland Bowen published his ideas about this in the 1960s when he was the editor of the Cricket Quarterly periodical. He began by stating that Sussex was publicly acknowledged as the "best county" in the 1827 season when they played against All England in the roundarm trial matches, although the team's involvement in these matches had more to do with the fact that Sussex was the prime mover in the "roundarm revolution". Kent, which had a celebrated team at the time, has long been acknowledged as a champion county in most seasons of the 1840s but in other years there is no clear-cut contender.

=== County clubs ===
The middle years of the 19th century are the period of county club formation. So, when title "claims" were made on behalf of Sussex in 1826 and 1827, it was for the same loose association based on Brighton Cricket Club that had a successful season in 1792. But claims on behalf of Sussex from 1845 were by the Sussex county club, founded in 1839. A similar situation existed with both Kent and Surrey. Nottinghamshire is the only other claimant before the 1860s, starting in 1852, but all of its claims have been made by the county club which was founded in 1841.

As the popularity of organised cricket grew throughout England, more county clubs came into contention and, by the mid-1860s, they included the short-lived Cambridgeshire, Hampshire, Lancashire, Middlesex and Yorkshire. At this time and into the 1870s, the press began to advocate some form of league system and various journals and individuals, including W. G. Grace, began publishing their views about who was the champion in a given season. Grace became interested after the Gloucestershire club was founded in 1870, with himself as captain, and laid several claims to the championship during the 1870s. In the 1870s, it became widely accepted that the team with fewest losses should be the champions. Various lists of unofficial champions began to be compiled by the contemporary press and others, but they are not usually in complete agreement.

=== The unofficial titles ===
All "titles" claimed before 1864 are strictly unofficial and are based on (a) contemporary claims made by or on behalf of a particular team and recorded at the time; (b) reverse analysis performed by a writer who was trying to establish the best team in a given season by reference to the known fixtures and results. It must be stressed that the purpose of such lists when published has never been to ascribe any kind of ruling but rather to provoke discussion. No real credibility can be attached to such claims except to acknowledge that a team was especially strong over a number of years: e.g., Kent in the 1720s; London in the 1730s; Hampshire in the 1770s and 1780s; Sussex in the 1820s; Kent in the 1840s; and Surrey in the 1850s.

From 1864 to 1889, the county championship title remained unofficial except that the idea was widely promoted by individuals in the contemporary press and that had not happened hitherto apart from occasional points of view. Each journalist tended to have his own ideas about the calculation method and the matches to be included, but there was a certain amount of consensus in the main, generally favouring the team with fewest defeats. The list below gives the champions quoted by the most prominent sources, including W. G. Grace (1864–1889), Wisden Cricketers' Almanack (1864–1889), John Lillywhite's Cricketer's Companion (1865–1884), James Lillywhite's Cricketers' Annual (1871–1889) and Cricket: A Weekly Record of the Game (1882–1889).

- 1864 – Surrey
- 1865 – Nottinghamshire
- 1866 – Middlesex
- 1867 – Yorkshire
- 1868 – Nottinghamshire (Wisden) & Yorkshire (Grace)
- 1869 – Nottinghamshire & Yorkshire (shared by consensus)
- 1870 – Yorkshire
- 1871 – Nottinghamshire
- 1872 – Nottinghamshire
- 1873 – Gloucestershire & Nottinghamshire (shared by consensus)
- 1874 – Gloucestershire
- 1875 – Nottinghamshire
- 1876 – Gloucestershire
- 1877 – Gloucestershire
- 1878 – undecided
- 1879 – Lancashire & Nottinghamshire (shared by consensus)
- 1880 – Nottinghamshire
- 1881 – Lancashire
- 1882 – Lancashire & Nottinghamshire (shared by consensus)
- 1883 – Nottinghamshire & Yorkshire (shared by consensus)
- 1884 – Nottinghamshire
- 1885 – Nottinghamshire
- 1886 – Nottinghamshire
- 1887 – Surrey
- 1888 – Surrey
- 1889 – Lancashire, Nottinghamshire & Surrey (shared by consensus)

The final tally over these 26 seasons was, therefore, Nottinghamshire (8 titles plus 7 shared); Gloucestershire (3/1); Surrey (3/1); Yorkshire (2/3); Lancashire (1/3); Middlesex (1/0).

=== Qualification rules ===
Prior to 1873, it was quite common for players to compete for both their county of birth and county of residence during a single season. Beginning in December 1872, three meetings were convened at which qualification rules were established, with the leading nine counties being represented either in writing or in person. At the last of these sessions, held at the Oval on 9 June 1873, it was decided:

- "That no cricketer, whether amateur or professional, shall play for more than one county during the same season".
- "Every cricketer born in one county and residing in another shall be free to choose at the commencement of each season for which of those counties he will play, and shall, during that season, play for the one county only".
- "A cricketer shall be qualified to play for the county in which he is residing and has resided for the previous two years: or a cricketer may elect to play for the county in which his family home is, so long as it remains open to him as an occasional residence".
- "That should any question arise as to the residential qualification, the same shall be left to the decision of the Marylebone Cricket Club".

=== Newspaper 'leagues' ===
It was in the 1870s that newspapers began to print tables of inter-county results and then proclaim a champion on the basis of their chosen criteria. In Arthur Haygarth's Scores and Biographies, reference is often made to "least matches lost" as a means of deciding the champion. This was a method that, in a modified form, permeated through to the official championship when one point was awarded for a win but one was deducted for a defeat. It was discontinued after 1909 as it was deemed to be inherently unsatisfactory and a points per win method replaced it in 1910.

As Derek Birley describes, the papers did not use standard criteria and so there were several seasons in which any title must be considered "shared", as there was no universally recognised winner. With no consistency of approach, the issue inevitably led to argument, counter-arguments and confusion until the matter was taken in hand at the meeting of club secretaries in December 1889 where the official championship was constituted.

In Roy Webber's The County Cricket Championship, he asserts that the championship "is generally accepted as starting in the 1873 season but that is a convenient date decided upon many years later" because 1873 was "the first season in which rules of county qualification were in operation". Webber acknowledges the difficulties posed from 1873 to 1890 by varying programmes with some county clubs playing many more matches than others. For example, in 1874 when Derbyshire was held by some to have won the title, they played only four matches while Yorkshire played twelve. A list of champions for the period would be subjective and in most seasons there would be strongly competing claims. In general, it may be asserted that Gloucestershire with all three Grace brothers were the strongest team in most of the 1870s; Nottinghamshire were in the ascendancy from about 1879 to 1886; and then Surrey from 1887 through the start of the official championship in 1890.

=== First official competition ===
When the annual meeting of county club secretaries was held at Lord's on 10 December 1889, their purpose was to decide on a fixture programme for the 1890 season. As reported by Cricket: A Weekly Record of the Game:

"While the secretaries were engaged in making the fixtures the representatives of the eight leading counties – Nottinghamshire, Surrey, Lancashire, Kent, Middlesex, Gloucestershire, Yorkshire, and Sussex – held a private meeting to discuss the method by which the county championship should in future be decided. The meeting was, we understand, not quite unanimous, but a majority were in favour of ignoring drawn games altogether and settling the question of championship by wins and losses. As it was agreed to abide by the views of the majority, this decision was accepted as final.
Subsequently representatives of the following eight minor counties – Derbyshire, Warwickshire, Leicestershire, Hampshire, Somersetshire, Staffordshire, Durham and Essex – held a similar meeting in private, and unanimously decided to apply the same rule to minor county cricket".

The first-ever official cricket County Championship match began on 12 May 1890: Yorkshire beat Gloucestershire by eight wickets at Bristol. James Cranston (Gloucestershire) scored the first century in the competition. The final positions in 1890 were based on number of wins minus the number of losses. Later, a points system was introduced but it has been subject to several variations.

=== Expansion and points systems ===
In the 1891 season, Somerset competed in the championship and in 1895 Derbyshire, Essex, Hampshire, Leicestershire and Warwickshire all joined; the rules were changed so each team had to play at least 16 matches per season. Until World War II, counties played differing numbers of matches, except that all counties were required to play 28 matches in each season from 1929 to 1932 inclusive. When the championship resumed in 1946, teams played 26 matches per season, and the pattern of a fixed number of matches has continued since then, although the number has varied, but again there was an exception. From 1960 to 1962 inclusive, counties could choose whether to play 28 or 32 matches.

The original points system was simply wins minus losses but with the expansion in 1895 the points system was modified so that the ratio of points to finished games (games minus draws) decided the final positions.

In 1910 the system was modified again so that the order was based on ratio of matches won to matches played, while from 1911 to 1967 several systems were used that generally relied on points for wins and for first innings leads in games left unfinished. Since 1968, the basis has been wins (increased from 10 points in 1968, to 12 in 1976, to 16 in 1981, then back down to 12 in 1999, up to 14 in 2004 and currently 16) and "bonus points", which are earned for scoring a certain number of runs or taking a certain number of wickets in the first 110 overs of each first innings (the number of overs has changed at various times, but has been 110 since 2010). In an effort to prevent early finishes, points have been awarded for draws since 1996. From 1974 to 1981 there was a limit of 200 overs for the first two innings; the team batting first were restricted to 100 overs and any unused overs were added to those allowed to the team batting second.

Of the current 18 teams in County Cricket the remaining four joined at the following dates:

- Worcestershire in 1899 (did not play in 1919)
- Northamptonshire in 1905
- Glamorgan in 1921
- Durham in 1992

An invitation in 1921 to Buckinghamshire was declined, due to lack of proper playing facilities, and an application by Devon in 1948 to join was rejected.

In the 21st century, questions have been raised about the future of the County Championship in the light of the shaky financial structure of many counties, poor attendances and the rise of Twenty20 cricket. Doubts have been raised over many decades concerning the competition's viability, yet it still survives. The Changing Face of Cricket (1966) by Sir Learie Constantine and Denzil Batchelor, made negative predictions about county cricket.

=== Recent developments ===
All matches before 1988 were scheduled for three days, normally of a nominal six hours each plus intervals, but often with the first two days lengthened by up to an hour and the final day shortened, so that teams with fixtures elsewhere on the following day could travel at sensible hours. The exception to this was the 1919 season, when there was an experiment with two-day matches played over longer hours, up to nine o'clock in the evening in mid-summer. This experiment was not repeated. From 1988 to 1992 some matches were played over four days, with each county playing six four-day and sixteen three-day games. From 1993 onwards, all matches have been scheduled for four days. In 2000, the championship adopted a two-divisional format with promotion and relegation each season. The ECB announced that, from 2017, Division One would contain eight teams and Division Two ten teams, with only one team being promoted from Division Two in 2016. The two-up, two-down arrangement applied for 2017 and 2018, but it was then decided to reverse the sizes of the divisions with effect from 2020, with three teams to be promoted and only one relegated at the end of the 2019 season.

From 2016 to 2019 there was no mandatory toss, with the away team having the option to bowl first. If the away team declined to bowl first, the toss still took place. This regulation was introduced on an experimental basis for the 2016 season but retained from 2017 to 2019 after being judged a success in its objectives of making games last longer and encouraging spin bowling. The mandatory toss was reinstated from the 2020 season with the ECB taking the view that increased pitch penalties and changes to the seam of the ball would improve the balance between batting and bowling.

The competition was not held in 2020 because of the COVID-19 pandemic, being replaced by an abbreviated competition called the Bob Willis Trophy.

In 2021 for one season only, there was a revised Championship format, with the aim of mitigating the impact of COVID-19. This consisted of three seeded groups of six teams playing home and away, after which the final three divisions were allocated, and the teams played the four teams they had not already played in their new division home and away. The top team in the top division at the end of the season were crowned Champions, with the top two teams in the top division going on to play for the Bob Willis Trophy in a five-day final at Lords.

== Teams ==
=== Stadiums and locations ===
Locations of current County Championship teams
County Championship clubs in Greater London

County Club	Ground	Location	First season in Championship	First title	Last title	Titles
Derbyshire	County Ground	Derby	1895	1936	1936	1
Durham	Riverside Ground	Chester-le-Street	1992	2008	2013	3
Essex	County Ground	Chelmsford	1895	1979	2019	8
Glamorgan	Sophia Gardens	Cardiff	1921	1948	1997	3
Gloucestershire	County Ground	Bristol	1890	–	–	0
Hampshire	Rose Bowl	Southampton	1895	1961	1973	2
Kent	St Lawrence Ground	Canterbury	1890	1906	1978	7 (1 shared)
Lancashire	Old Trafford	Manchester	1890	1897	2011	9 (1 shared)
Leicestershire	Grace Road	Leicester	1895	1975	1998	3
Middlesex	Lord's	London	1890	1903	2016	13 (2 shared)
Northamptonshire	County Ground	Northampton	1905	–	–	0
Nottinghamshire	Trent Bridge	Nottingham	1890	1907	2025	7
Somerset	County Ground	Taunton	1891	–	–	0
Surrey	The Oval	London	1890	1890	2024	23 (1 shared)
Sussex	County Ground	Hove	1890	2003	2007	3
Warwickshire	Edgbaston	Birmingham	1895	1911	2026	9
Worcestershire	New Road	Worcester	1899	1964	1989	5
Yorkshire	Headingley	Leeds	1890	1893	2015	33 (1 shared)

== Competition format ==
=== Points system ===
The County Championship works on a points system, with the winner being the team with most points in the first division. The points are currently awarded as follows, with a draw being increased to 8 points from 2024 after a reduction to 5 points in 2023:

Win: 16 points + bonus points
Tie: 8 points + bonus points
Draw: 8 points + bonus points
Loss: 0 points + bonus points

Bonus points may be earned during the initial 110 overs of each team's first innings, and are retained whatever the match outcome. The minimum number of runs required to earn batting points was increased from 200 to 250 in 2023.

Bonus points awarded
Runs scored	Wickets taken	Points
250–299	3–5	1
300–349	6–8	2
350–399	9–10	3
400–449		4
450 or more		5

=== Deductions ===
Occasionally, a team may have points deducted. Reasons for points deductions are as follows:

- Fielding an unregistered player: Points were deducted from Lancashire and Sussex in 1978, and Middlesex in 1981. In each case, the county had played an unregistered player in one match, and all points awarded in that match were deducted.
- Poor pitches: Penalties for poor pitches were initially introduced at 25 points (one more than the points for a win with maximum bonus points at the time). The first team to lose points for a poor pitch were Essex in 1989, a deduction which cost them first place in the championship. In later years, smaller penalties were introduced. In 2011, Warwickshire, Hampshire and Kent were all docked 8 points for poor pitches at Edgbaston, the Rose Bowl and Canterbury respectively. In 2019 Somerset were deducted 24 points, of which 12 were applied in the 2021 competition and 12 were suspended for the 2022 competition, for a poor pitch in their title-deciding game with Essex.
- Slow over rates: Deductions for a slow over rate were introduced in 2001, units of 0.25 points per over short of the target number in any match. The penalty was increased to 0.5 points per over in 2004, and to 1 point per over in 2008.
- Ball-tampering: Surrey lost 8 points for ball-tampering in 2005 and were relegated at the end of that season.
- Breach of salary cap: Durham were subject to a 2.5-point penalty in the 2013 County Championship, as well as penalties in the limited over competitions, for breach of the salary cap in 2012. Despite this penalty, Durham still won the County Championship in 2013.
- Discipline: Leicestershire were fined 16 points in 2015 "in respect of five or more separate occasions when their players committed fixed penalty offences in a 12-month period." Leicestershire were fined 16 points in 2017 after a further five offences in the previous 12 months.
- Financial issues: As well as being demoted from Division One, Durham were subject to a 48-point penalty in Division Two in the 2017 County Championship and penalties in the limited over competitions. This was for requiring financial assistance from the ECB. Middlesex had a points deduction imposed in each county competition equal to one win imposed in September 2023, suspended until 31 October 2025, for breaching ECB financial regulations.
- Non-regulation equipment: In 2024, Essex had 12 points deducted because Feroze Khushi used an oversize bat in a game against Nottinghamshire.
- Other: Yorkshire were deducted 48 points in 2023 by the Cricket Discipline Commission for their handling of the Yorkshire County Cricket Club racism scandal.

=== Tie-breakers ===
If any teams have equal points, tie-breakers are applied in the following order: most wins, fewest losses, team achieving most points in contests between teams level on points, most wickets taken, most runs scored.

== Results ==
=== Official county champions ===
Yorkshire have won the most County Championships with 32 outright titles and one shared. Three current first-class counties (Gloucestershire, Northamptonshire and Somerset) have never won the official title, although Gloucestershire had claim to three unofficial titles in the 1870s.

=== Promoted and relegated ===
Since 2000, there have been two divisions, and promotion and relegation between them. Every county has experienced both divisions at some stage. For the 2020 and 2021 seasons, there was no promotion or relegation due to the revised formats brought around by the COVID-19 pandemic.

Year	Relegated from Division 1	Promoted from Division 2
2000	Hampshire, Durham, Derbyshire	Northamptonshire, Essex, Glamorgan
2001	Northamptonshire, Glamorgan, Essex	Sussex, Hampshire, Warwickshire
2002	Hampshire, Somerset, Yorkshire	Essex, Middlesex, Nottinghamshire
2003	Essex, Nottinghamshire, Leicestershire	Worcestershire, Northamptonshire, Gloucestershire
2004	Worcestershire, Lancashire, Northamptonshire	Nottinghamshire, Hampshire, Glamorgan
2005	Surrey, Gloucestershire, Glamorgan	Lancashire, Durham, Yorkshire
2006	Nottinghamshire, Middlesex	Surrey, Worcestershire
2007	Warwickshire, Worcestershire	Somerset, Nottinghamshire
2008	Kent, Surrey	Warwickshire, Worcestershire
2009	Sussex, Worcestershire	Kent, Essex
2010	Essex, Kent	Sussex, Worcestershire
2011	Hampshire, Yorkshire	Middlesex, Surrey
2012	Lancashire, Worcestershire	Derbyshire, Yorkshire
2013	Derbyshire, Surrey	Lancashire, Northamptonshire
2014	Northamptonshire, Lancashire	Hampshire, Worcestershire
2015	Worcestershire, Sussex	Surrey, Lancashire
2016	Durham^{[a]}, Nottinghamshire	Essex
2017	Middlesex, Warwickshire	Worcestershire, Nottinghamshire
2018	Lancashire, Worcestershire	Kent, Warwickshire
2019	Nottinghamshire	Lancashire, Northamptonshire, Gloucestershire
2022	Yorkshire, Gloucestershire	Nottinghamshire, Middlesex
2023	Middlesex, Northamptonshire	Durham, Worcestershire
2024	Kent, Lancashire	Sussex, Yorkshire
2025	Worcestershire, Durham	Leicestershire, Glamorgan
2026	Leicestershire, Hampshire	Durham, Kent

^{a} Durham finished fourth in 2016 but were relegated as a penalty by the ECB over financial issues, replacing Hampshire who finished eighth.

=== Wooden spoons ===
Since the expansion of the Championship from 9 counties to 14 in 1895, the wooden spoon for finishing bottom has been 'won' by the teams shown in the table below. Lancashire, Middlesex, and Surrey have never finished bottom. Leicestershire have shared last place twice, with Hampshire and Somerset.

Wins	County
15	Derbyshire
12	Somerset
11	Northamptonshire
10	Glamorgan
10	Leicestershire
9	Gloucestershire
8	Nottinghamshire
8	Sussex
6	Worcestershire
5	Durham
5	Hampshire
3	Warwickshire
2	Essex
2	Kent
1	Yorkshire

== Records ==
Records can be found at Cricket Archive – County Championship Records.(subscription required)

=== Highest team scores ===
A team has scored 800 or more runs in the County Championship on eight occasions, with Yorkshire holding the record for the highest score of 887 all out against Warwickshire in 1896.

Total	For and against	Venue	Season
887	Yorkshire v. Warwickshire	Edgbaston	1896
863	Lancashire v. Surrey	The Oval	1990
850/7d	Somerset v. Middlesex	Taunton	2007
820/9d	Surrey v. Durham	The Oval	2025
811	Surrey v. Somerset	The Oval	1899
810/4d	Warwickshire v. Durham	Edgbaston	1994
803/4d	Kent v. Essex	Brentwood	1934
801/8d	Derbyshire v. Somerset	Taunton	2007

=== Lowest team scores ===
Total	For and against	Venue	Season
12	Northamptonshire v. Gloucestershire	Spa Ground, Gloucester	1907
13	Nottinghamshire v. Yorkshire	Trent Bridge	1901
14	Surrey v. Essex	Chelmsford	1983
15	Hampshire v. Warwickshire (Hampshire recovered to win the match)	Edgbaston	1922
16	Warwickshire v. Kent	Angel Ground, Tonbridge	1913
20	Sussex v. Yorkshire	The Circle, Kingston upon Hull	1922
20	Derbyshire v. Yorkshire	Bramall Lane, Sheffield	1939
20	Essex v. Lancashire	Chelmsford	2013

=== Most runs in an innings ===
Total	Batsman	For and against	Venue	Season
501*	Brian Lara	Warwickshire v. Durham	Edgbaston	1994
424	Archie MacLaren	Lancashire v. Somerset	Taunton	1895
410*	Sam Northeast	Glamorgan v. Leicestershire	Leicester	2022
405*	Graeme Hick	Worcestershire v. Somerset	Taunton	1988
371	Tom Banton	Somerset v. Worcestershire	Taunton	2025
366	Neil Fairbrother	Lancashire v. Surrey	The Oval	1990
357*	Bobby Abel	Surrey v. Somerset	The Oval	1899

=== Best bowling in an innings ===
Total	Bowler	For and against	Venue	Season
10/10	Hedley Verity	Yorkshire v. Nottinghamshire	Headingley	1932
10/18	George Geary	Leicestershire v. Glamorgan	Ynysangharad Park, Pontypridd	1929
10/30	Colin Blythe	Kent v. Northamptonshire	Northampton	1907
10/32	Harry Pickett	Essex v. Leicestershire	Leyton	1895
10/35	Alonzo Drake	Yorkshire v. Somerset	Clarence Park, Weston-super-Mare	1914
10/36	Hedley Verity	Yorkshire v. Warwickshire	Headingley	1931
10/40	George Dennett	Gloucestershire v. Essex	Bristol	1906
10/40	Billy Bestwick	Derbyshire v. Glamorgan	Cardiff Arms Park	1921
10/40	Gubby Allen	Middlesex v. Lancashire	Lord's	1929

== Sponsors ==
The County Championship has been sponsored since 2025 by Rothesay and titled the Rothesay County Championship.

The competition has been sponsored since 1977, as follows;

- 1977–1983 Schweppes
- 1984–1998 Britannic Assurance
- 1999–2000 AXA ppp Healthcare
- 2001 Cricinfo
- 2002–2005 Frizzell
- 2006–2015 Liverpool Victoria (now branded as "LV=")
- 2016–2019 Specsavers
- 2021–2023 LV= Insurance
- 2024 Vitality Health and Life Insurance
- 2025 Rothesay

== See also ==
- Pro40
- Friends Provident Trophy
- T20 Blast
- One-Day Cup
- National Counties of English and Welsh cricket – Minor counties cricket
- National Counties Cricket Championship – Minor counties cricket competition
- List of professional sports teams in the United Kingdom
