= Bruce Carnegie-Brown =

British business executive (born 1959)

Bruce Carnegie-Brown DL
- Born: 27 December 1959 (age 66); Freetown, Sierra Leone
- Education: University of Oxford
- Occupation: Businessman
- Title: Chairman, Rothesay
- Term: July 2025 - present
- Children: 4

Bruce Neil Carnegie-Brown (born 27 December 1959) is chairman of Rothesay Ltd, Ebury Partners Ltd, Gresham House Ltd and Cuvva Ltd. He was Chair of the insurance market Lloyd's of London, from 2017-2025 and Vice Chairman of Banco Santander (2015-2024). He was also chairman of the Marylebone Cricket Club (2021-2024) and chair of the Leadership Council of TheCityUK (2022-2025). He was appointed a deputy lieutenant of Greater London in 2015.

== Early life and education ==
Bruce Carnegie-Brown was born on 27 December 1959 in Freetown, British Sierra Leone. His father was an engineer and tobacco executive, and the family relocated often, including to Libya, Jordan, Tanzania and Malaysia. He attended Cheltenham College, in 1973 and leaving in 1977. In 1977, he won a scholarship to study English Language and Literature at Exeter College, Oxford matriculating in 1978 and graduating with a First Class Honours degree in 1981.

== Career ==
After leaving university, Carnegie-Brown spent four years at Bank of America as an investment banker, before joining JP Morgan, where he worked for 18 years, including three years in Tokyo as chairman and head of the Asia-Pacific investment banking business from 1997 to 2000. He was a member of the Global Investment Banking Management Committee from 1997 to 2000 and a member of the Global Markets Management Committee from 2001 to 2003. From 2003 to 2006 he worked for insurance broker Marsh & McLennan as CEO of its UK, European and Middle East businesses.

Carnegie-Brown was later hired in 2006 as a managing partner at 3i Quoted Private Equity, leading an activist investment team. He left the position in 2009 before the company was acquired by its parent company, 3i.

Carnegie-Brown has since held numerous positions as chairman and non-executive director for multiple companies, including Close Brothers Group (non-executive director, 2006 to 2014); Catlin Group (non-executive director, 2010 to 2014); Aon UK (chairman, 2012 to 2015); JLT Group (non-executive director, 2016 to 2017); Moneysupermarket.com Group (chairman, May 2014 to May 2019) and Santander UK (non-executive director, 2012 to 2021).

He was vice-chairman of Banco Santander from February 2015 to March 2024 and was the Chair of Lloyd's of London from 2017 to 2025. From 2017 to 2020, he was president of the Chartered Management Institute. He was a trustee of Historic Royal Palaces from January 2015 until October 2019 and was a trustee of the Shakespeare's Globe Trust from 2006 to 2014. Carnegie-Brown was appointed a deputy lieutenant of Greater London in 2015.

In 2019, Carnegie-Brown was appointed chairman of InsurTech start-up Cuvva Ltd.

From 2021 to 2024 he was chairman of the Marylebone Cricket Club, having previously served for two years on the Finance Committee. He also served on the ECB’s Professional Game Committee.

From April 2022 to June 2025, Carnegie-Brown was chair of the Leadership Council of TheCityUK, an advocacy group promoting financial and related professional services industries of the United Kingdom.

In July 2024, Carnegie-Brown was appointed chairman of Gresham House Ltd, a specialist asset manager with significant investments in forestry and batteries. And in September 2024, he was appointed chairman of Ebury Partners Ltd, a foreign exchange payments business. In May 2025, he joined the Board of Rothesay Life, becoming chair in July 2025.

From March 2024 to June 2025, Carnegie-Brown served as the FCDO’s nominee on the Business Advisory Council of the Ukraine Donor Platform.

== Personal life ==
Bruce lives in Putney, London, and is married to Jane and has four children and three grandchildren. His brother, Ian Carnegie-Brown, is an investment banker at UBS.
