= Michael Sherwood (banker) =

British banker (born 1965)

- Born: July 1965 (age 61)
- Education: Westminster School
- Alma mater: University of Manchester
- Occupation: Banker
- Spouse: Melanie Sherwood
- Children: 2

Michael Sherwood, also known as Woody, (born 1965) is a British banker. He served as the vice-chairman of Goldman Sachs and the co-chief executive officer of Goldman Sachs International until November 2016.

According to the Sunday Times Rich List in 2019, Sherwood is worth £195 million, a £10 million decrease from 2018.

== Early life ==
Michael Sherwood was born in July 1965 in London. His father was "the owner of a chemical company" and his mother was an academic. He grew up in Highgate, North London.

Sherwood was educated at Westminster School. He graduated from the University of Manchester, where he received a bachelor's degree in economics.

== Career ==
Sherwood started his career at Goldman Sachs in 1986. He served as the co-chief executive officer of Goldman Sachs International from 2005 to November 2016. Additionally, he served as the vice-chairman of Goldman Sachs from 2008 to November 2016. He was succeeded in these two roles by Richard Gnodde.

Sherwood acquired Smythson for GBP£16 million in 2005 and sold it for GBP£18 million in 2009. He invested GBP£400,000 in Tottenham Hotspur F.C., a football club in Tottenham, London, in 2009. He formerly served on the board of directors of Watford F.C., a football club in Watford near London. Sherwood serves as a non-executive director of Rothesay Life, a life insurance company.

Sherwood received a bonus of $15.8 million in shares in 2013, which was more than CEO Lloyd Blankfein's bonus. He earned US$21 million in 2014. By April 2015, he had an estimated wealth of GBP£185 million.

Sherwood is opposed to Brexit.

In July 2019, it was reported in The Times that Sherwood will be made non-executive director of fintech unicorn Revolut.

== Philanthropy ==
Sherwood serves as the chairman of the Development Committee at his alma mater, the Westminster School. He has donated to the Harefield Academy. He serves on the board of trustees of Greenhouse Sports, a non-profit organisation which encourages children to play sports. With his wife, Sherwood has made charitable contributions to the Jewish Museum London via their Melanie and Michael Sherwood Foundation.

== Personal life ==
Sherwood is married to Melanie. They reside near Regent's Park in central London with their two children. Sherwood is Jewish.

Sherwood is a close confidant of retail tycoon Sir Philip Green and informally advised him on the sale of British Home Stores for £1 to Dominic Chappell in 2015.
