= 1990 County Championship =

English cricket tournament

- Dates: 26 April – 21 September 1990
- Administrator: England and Wales Cricket Board
- Cricket format: First-class cricket
- Tournament format: League system
- Champions: Middlesex (9th title)
- Participants: 17
- Matches: 187
- Most runs: Jimmy Cook, (Somerset); 2,432
- Most wickets: Neil Foster, (Essex); 94

The 1990 Britannic Assurance County Championship was the 91st officially organised running of the County Championship. Middlesex won the Championship title.

The Championship was sponsored by Britannic Assurance for the seventh time.

== Table ==
- 16 points for a win
- 8 points to each team for a tie
- 8 points to team still batting in a match in which scores finish level
- Bonus points awarded in the first 100 overs of the first innings
  - Batting: 150 runs - 1 point, 200 runs - 2 points 250 runs - 3 points, 300 runs - 4 points
  - Bowling: 3-4 wickets - 1 point, 5-6 wickets - 2 points 7-8 wickets - 3 points, 9-10 wickets - 4 points
- No bonus points awarded in a match starting with less than 8 hours' play remaining. A one-innings match is played, with the winner gaining 12 points.
- Position determined by points gained. If equal, then decided on most wins.

	Team	P	W	L	D	Bat	Bowl	Pts
1	Middlesex	22	10	1	11	73	55	288
2	Essex	22	8	2	12	73	56	257
3	Hampshire	22	8	4	10	67	48	243
4	Worcestershire	22	7	1	14	70	58	240
5	Warwickshire	22	7	7	8	55	64	231
6	Lancashire	22	6	3	13	65	56	217
7	Leicestershire	22	6	7	9	61	53	210
8	Glamorgan	22	5	6	11	64	48	192
9	Surrey	22	4	3	15	54	64	190
10	Yorkshire	22	5	9	8	52	55	187
11	Northamptonshire	22	4	9	9	61	60	185
12	Derbyshire	22	6	7	9	58	52	181
13	Gloucestershire	22	4	7	11	51	58	173
14	Nottinghamshire	22	4	8	10	51	58	173
15	Somerset	22	3	4	15	73	45	166
16	Kent	22	3	6	13	69	35	152
17	Sussex	22	3	9	10	51	44	143
