= National Television Awards =

British television awards ceremony

- Current: 31st National Television Awards
- Location: Wembley Conference Centre (1995); Royal Albert Hall (1996–2008); The O2 Arena (2010–2021, 2023–present); OVO Arena Wembley (2022)
- Country: United Kingdom
- Presented by: Eamonn Holmes (1995); Sir Trevor McDonald (1996–2008); Dermot O'Leary (2010–2019); David Walliams (2020); Joel Dommett (2021–present)
- First award: 1995
- Website: nationaltvawards.com

Television/radio coverage
- Network: ITV
- Runtime: 150 minutes (inc. adverts)
- Produced by: Indigo Television

The National Television Awards (often shortened to NTAs) is a British television awards ceremony, broadcast by the ITV network and begun in 1995. The National Television Awards are the most prominent ceremony for which the results are voted on by the general public and are often branded as "television's biggest night of the year". In addition, an equivalent awards ceremony for film, called the National Movie Awards, was held in 2007 and 2008, before being revived in 2010 but has not been held since 2011.

== History ==
The first National Television Awards (NTAs) ceremony was held in August 1995 and was hosted by Eamonn Holmes at Wembley Conference Centre. From 1996 onwards, it was traditionally held annually in October at the Royal Albert Hall and hosted by Sir Trevor McDonald. McDonald retired from the role after 12 years in 2008. In July 2009, after ITV decided not to broadcast it that year due to financial issues, the NTAs changed the timing of the event from October to January as part of a new deal with the broadcaster. For the 2010 ceremony, Dermot O'Leary took over as host, and the ceremony was hosted at the O2 for the first time.

O'Leary decided to leave the programme on 13 February 2019. On 4 October 2019, in a video posted on social media, David Walliams was announced as the new NTAs host for 2020. Despite this, the ceremony remained at the O2 for the 10th successive year. The 26th ceremony was originally going to take place on 26 January but then due to the COVID-19 pandemic, it was postponed to 20 April, then postponed again to 9 September.

In May 2021, it was announced that Joel Dommett would present the 26th ceremony, replacing Walliams. On 6 April 2022, it was confirmed that Dommett would return as host with the ceremony being held in September at a new venue, this being OVO Arena Wembley. The 2022 ceremony was subsequently delayed to 13 October as a mark of respect following the death of Elizabeth II. In 2023, it returned to the O2 with Dommett returning as host.

The 2024 ceremony took place on 11 September 2024.

The 2025 ceremony took place on 10 September 2025.

The 2026 ceremony took place on 8 September 2026.

The 2027 ceremony will take place on 8 September 2027.

== Ceremonies ==
Edition	Date	Venue	Presenter	Special Recognition winner
1st	29 August 1995	Wembley Conference Centre	Eamonn Holmes	Julie Goodyear
2nd	9 October 1996	Royal Albert Hall	Sir Trevor McDonald	David Jason
3rd	8 October 1997	Royal Albert Hall	Sir Trevor McDonald	Robson Green
4th	27 October 1998	Royal Albert Hall	Sir Trevor McDonald	John Thaw
5th	26 October 1999	Royal Albert Hall	Sir Trevor McDonald	Michael Barrymore
6th	10 October 2000	Royal Albert Hall	Sir Trevor McDonald	Chris Tarrant
7th	23 October 2001	Royal Albert Hall	Sir Trevor McDonald	Des O'Connor
8th	15 October 2002	Royal Albert Hall	Sir Trevor McDonald	Ant & Dec
9th	28 October 2003	Royal Albert Hall	Sir Trevor McDonald	Sir Trevor McDonald
10th	26 October 2004	Royal Albert Hall	Sir Trevor McDonald	Caroline Quentin
11th	25 October 2005	Royal Albert Hall	Sir Trevor McDonald	Jamie Oliver
12th	31 October 2006	Royal Albert Hall	Sir Trevor McDonald	Sir David Attenborough
13th	31 October 2007	Royal Albert Hall	Sir Trevor McDonald	Jeremy Clarkson
14th	29 October 2008	Royal Albert Hall	Sir Trevor McDonald	Simon Cowell
15th	20 January 2010	The O2 Arena	Dermot O'Leary	Stephen Fry
16th	26 January 2011	The O2 Arena	Dermot O'Leary	Bruce Forsyth
17th	25 January 2012	The O2 Arena	Dermot O'Leary	Jonathan Ross
18th	23 January 2013	The O2 Arena	Dermot O'Leary	Joanna Lumley
19th	22 January 2014	The O2 Arena	Dermot O'Leary	None
20th	21 January 2015	The O2 Arena	Dermot O'Leary	David Tennant
21st	20 January 2016	The O2 Arena	Dermot O'Leary	Sir Billy Connolly
22nd	25 January 2017	The O2 Arena	Dermot O'Leary	Graham Norton
23rd	23 January 2018	The O2 Arena	Dermot O'Leary	Paul O'Grady: For the Love of Dogs
24th	22 January 2019	The O2 Arena	Dermot O'Leary	David Dimbleby
25th	28 January 2020	The O2 Arena	David Walliams	Sir Michael Palin
26th	9 September 2021	The O2 Arena	Joel Dommett	Line of Duty
27th	13 October 2022	OVO Arena Wembley	Joel Dommett	Sir Lenny Henry
28th	5 September 2023	The O2 Arena	Joel Dommett	Sarah Lancashire
29th	11 September 2024	The O2 Arena	Joel Dommett	Davina McCall
30th	10 September 2025	The O2 Arena	Joel Dommett	Wallace & Gromit
31st	8 September 2026	The O2 Arena	Joel Dommett	Alan Carr
32nd	8 September 2027	The O2 Arena	Joel Dommett	TBA

== See also ==
- National Movie Awards
