= Christopher Benson (businessman) =

British businessman (1933–2024)

Sir Christopher Benson OAM DL FRICS
- Born: Christopher John Benson; 20 July 1933; Staffordshire, England
- Died: 21 January 2024 (aged 90); Salisbury, England
- Occupation(s): Chartered surveyor and company director
- Spouse: Margaret Josephine Bundy (m. 1960)

Sir Christopher John Benson (20 July 1933 – 21 January 2024) was a British chartered surveyor and company director, chairman of major companies and public bodies, and a High Sheriff of Wiltshire.

== Early life and naval service ==
Benson was born in Wheaton Aston, Staffordshire in 1933, the only son of Charles Woodburn Benson and Catherine Clara Bishton. He was privately educated at the King's School Worcester, then after failing to enter Dartmouth naval college he joined Thames Nautical Training College to receive training as a seagoing officer. At age 16 he entered the merchant navy and was employed by the Union-Castle Line. After a spell of conscription in the Royal Navy, he was posted to RNAS Lossiemouth where he played rugby for the Navy's Scotland team. He was seriously injured in a car accident at the age of 20, and invalided out of the Navy.

== Business career ==
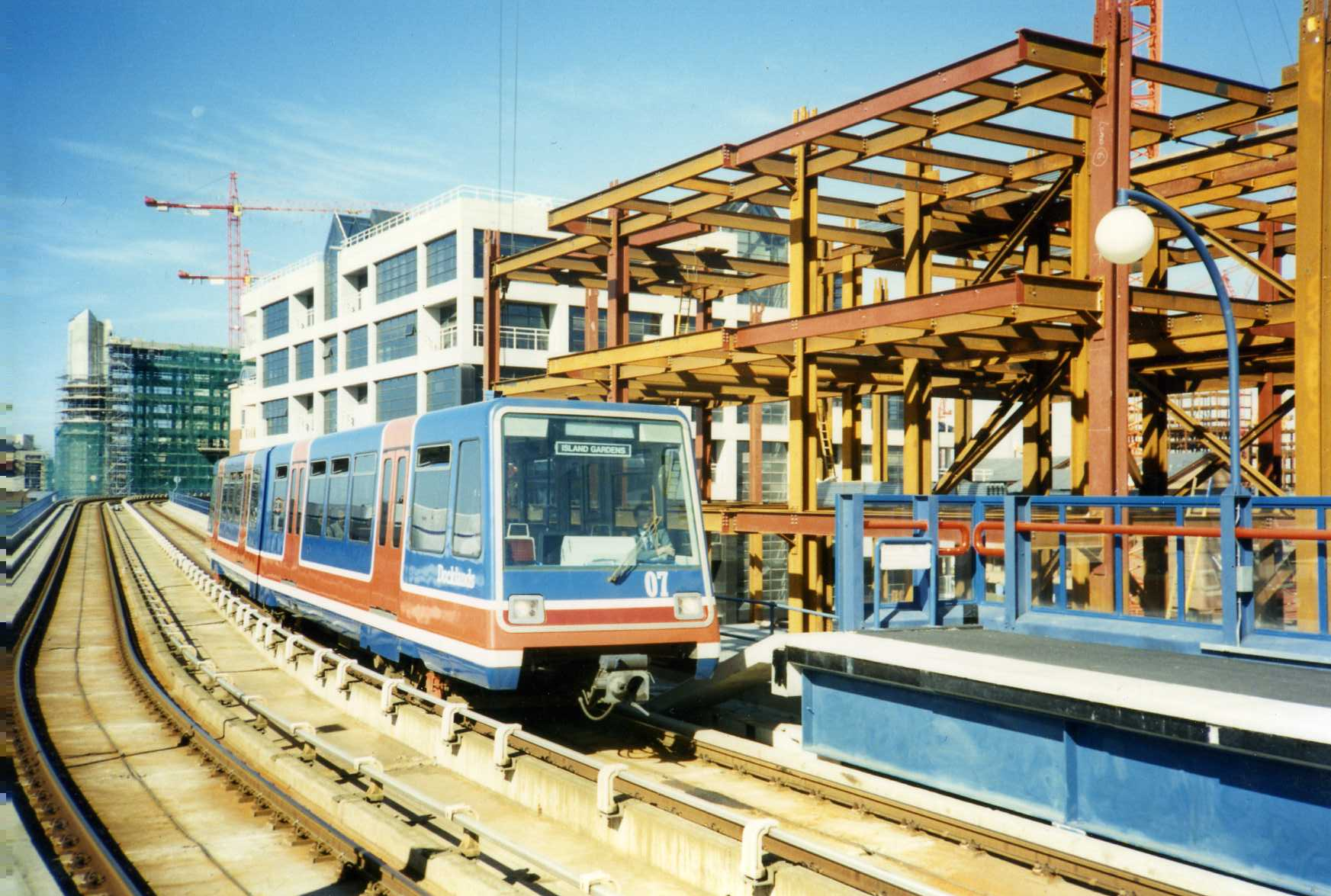
The Docklands Light Railway at South Quay DLR station in 1991, both built as a result of LDDC interventions

Benson began a career as an agricultural auctioneer and valuer, then turned to commercial property in 1965. He worked for a time for Arndale Developments, a builder of shopping centres, and qualified as a chartered surveyor. He started his own firm, Dolphin Developments, in 1969. In 1973 he sold his company and was hired as a director of property developer MEPC plc, where he became managing director in 1975 and was credited with rescuing the company from the effects of the 1973–1975 recession.

In 1988, he became a director of Sun Alliance, where he was chairman from 1993 to 1996, then chairman of the enlarged Royal and Sun Alliance until 1998. In 1997, he was appointed by the government to chair its Funding Agency for Schools. Benson was also chairman of Costain Group, Boots (1990–1994) and Albright and Wilson. In 1984 he was appointed to chair the London Docklands Development Corporation where he was involved in the development of the Canary Wharf business district.

== Charitable works ==
Outside business, Benson was a vice-president of the Royal Society of Arts, Master of the Company of Watermen and Lightermen and President of the Coram Foundation. He was an honorary bencher of the Middle Temple, serving on its Scholarship Fund Appeal Committee. He served as chair of the Civic Trust, a charity which championed high-quality architecture. On his death he had been chairman of the National Deaf Children's Society for over 30 years.

== Personal life ==
In 1960, in Salisbury, Benson married Margaret Josephine Bundy, a daughter of Ernest Jefferis Bundy. They had two sons. A justice of the peace, mayor of Salisbury (1969–1970), and a deputy lieutenant of Wiltshire from 1997, Jo Benson was awarded the OBE in 1973. The couple made significant donations to Salisbury District Hospital. She died on 1 August 2022.

Sir Christopher Benson died from pulmonary fibrosis at home in Salisbury, on 21 January 2024, at the age of 90. His funeral service was held at Salisbury Cathedral on 22 February 2024.

== Honours and awards ==
Benson was knighted in the 1988 New Year Honours for public services. He served as a magistrate for over 20 years and was High Sheriff of Wiltshire for 2002. In 2005 he was commissioned a Deputy lieutenant of Greater London. He was awarded an honorary Medal of the Order of Australia in January 2020 for service to the bilateral relationship between Australia and the United Kingdom.
