= Trevor McDonald =

British newsreader and journalist (born 1939)

Sir Trevor McDonald OBE DL
- Born: George McDonald; 16 August 1939 (age 87); San Fernando, Trinidad and Tobago, British Windward Islands
- Occupations: Newsreader, journalist
- Years active: 1973–present
- Notable credits: News at Ten; Tonight with Trevor McDonald
- Title: Knight Bachelor, OBE
- Spouses: Beryl (m. 1964; div. 1985) Josephine (m. 1986; sep. 2020)
- Children: 3

Sir Trevor Lawson McDonald (born George McDonald; 16 August 1939) is a Trinidadian–British newsreader and journalist, best known for his career as a news presenter with Independent Television News (ITN).

McDonald began his career working as a print and broadcast journalist for Naparima College's Blue Circle Network. He began his professional career with Radio Trinidad as a reporter and worked as a news reader and sports journalist for Trinidad Television. McDonald was employed by BBC Radio in 1969 as a producer, based in London but still broadcasting to the Caribbean. In 1973, he began his long association with ITN as a general reporter and was also ITN's first black reporter. McDonald was promoted in 1992 as the sole presenter of News at Ten and became a well-known face on British television screens. He was the presenter of the current affairs programme Tonight with Trevor McDonald and a series of documentaries for ITV.

McDonald was knighted in 1999 for his services to journalism and was appointed a deputy lieutenant of Greater London in 2006. He is a recipient of the National Television Award for Special Recognition and the BAFTA Fellowship. In 2006, the British public ranked McDonald number 31 in ITV's poll of TV's 50 Greatest Stars.

== Early life and education ==
McDonald was born as George McDonald to a working-class family on 16 August 1939, in San Fernando, Trinidad, an island in the West Indies that was a British colony at the time. He is the son of Josephine and Lawson McDonald, a self-taught engineer from Grenada who moved to Trinidad to work on an oil refinery. McDonald is of Dougla heritage, his mother being of African descent and his father being of Indian descent. He grew up in a poor household in the fishing village of St. Margaret in the south of Trinidad, and is the oldest of four children in his family.

McDonald did not receive much of an education at school, going against his parents' wishes, but they ensured his English was of high standard by learning the speech of the announcers working at the BBC World Service. His father supplemented the small income by mending shoes and keeping pigs in his spare time to fund the family's education.

Although his mother wanted him to become a lawyer, McDonald began working in broadcasting through Naparima College's Blue Circle Network in San Fernando.

== Career ==
=== Early career ===
McDonald's professional work started when he was a radio reporter for Radio Trinidad, news presenter and sports journalist for Trinidad Television as well as newspapers and radio in the early 1960s. He became a producer for both the BBC World Service and the BBC Caribbean Service in 1962. In 1969, McDonald moved to London and was employed by the BBC World Service as a producer at Bush House, but still broadcast to the Caribbean.

Finding he was slow-moving at progressing and eager to advance his career, at the urging of his colleagues in 1973, he was employed by Independent Television News (ITN) editor Nigel Ryan to work at the news organisation as a general reporter and was also ITN's first black reporter. Aware of this fact, he requested that, as part of his employment with ITN, that he was not "to do token black stories" in Brixton. McDonald had been approached by BBC Television after they claimed they heard of his work in television in Trinidad. He was told the corporation was under pressure from the Race Relations Board to employ more black reporters but declined because he wanted to be employed on merit and not because of his race. McDonald worked as a Northern Ireland correspondent reporting on The Troubles, and later became a sports correspondent from 1978 to 1980, reporting on events such as the 1978 FIFA World Cup matches involving Scotland.

He ultimately concentrated on international politics between January 1980 and 1982 as diplomatic correspondent and newsreader. This came after Ryan suggested that McDonald "be like Sandy Gall" and travel the world as a reporter, combining that role with reading the news on occasion. From 1982 to 1987 he was employed as a diplomatic correspondent and newsreader of the ITN-produced Channel 4 News evening bulletin, but returned to ITV in early 1989, presenting the Early Evening News and rotated that bulletin along with the weekend news duties with Fiona Armstrong. He conducted the first interview with Nelson Mandela after his release from prison and interviewed Saddam Hussein just after the Iraqi invasion of Kuwait.

=== News at Ten ===
McDonald was promoted on 9 November 1992 as the main presenter of News at Ten when the bulletin was revamped from its two-presenter format to a one-newsreader format after market research determined that audiences preferred him over younger colleagues. He became a well-known face on British television screens as a result. McDonald remained with ITN when News at Ten was axed by ITV on 5 March 1999 in order to broadcast more films and drama. He went on to present the new ITV Evening News from 1999 to 2001. News at Ten was briefly relaunched for three nights a week on 22 January 2001, to which McDonald returned as a presenter. He presented the ITV News at 10.30 following News at Ten's second axing in January 2004.

=== Tonight ===
From 1999 to 2007, McDonald hosted ITV's flagship current affairs magazine programme Tonight with Trevor McDonald. The show was revived in 2010 with presenter Julie Etchingham.

=== First retirement ===
McDonald presented what was set to be his last ITV News bulletin on 15 December 2005. He stepped down from his role as anchor after more than 30 years at ITN, but said he had no plans to retire completely from television. McDonald told his ITN colleagues that he wanted a low-key departure after having observed the departures of Tom Brokaw and Dan Rather in the United States. At the end of the final programme, he signed off with the words:

That brings to an end my association with the news at 10.30. Thank you for watching and thank you for all your generous messages. Good night and goodbye.

=== Return to News at Ten ===
On 31 October 2007, ITV announced that, early in 2008, McDonald would come out of retirement to present the relaunched News at Ten together with Etchingham.

=== Second retirement ===
It was announced on 30 October 2008 that McDonald would step down from News at Ten once the 2008 United States presidential election was over, to be replaced by Mark Austin. His last bulletin was on 20 November 2008. It was reported at the time that he would continue to present links for Tonight.

=== Documentaries ===
McDonald has presented a series of documentaries for ITV. In 2009, McDonald travelled to the Caribbean for the three-part series The Secret Caribbean with Trevor McDonald. Two years later, McDonald travelled around the Mediterranean for the four-part series The Secret Mediterranean with Trevor McDonald. and along the route of the Mississippi River for the three-part series The Mighty Mississippi with Trevor McDonald in 2012.

In 2012, McDonald presented Queen Elizabeth II: Her Remarkable Life Through The Decades. In 2013, he visited death row inmates in Indiana and hosted the two-part series Inside Death Row. McDonald presented the documentary Women Behind Bars: Life and Death in Indiana that same year. He travelled to New York City for the two-part series The Mafia with Trevor McDonald in early 2015. In late 2015, he presented Las Vegas with Trevor McDonald, a two-part series. In September 2016, McDonald presented a two-part series called Inside Scotland Yard With Trevor McDonald, and the two-part documentary Mafia Women with Trevor McDonald in February 2017.

In late 2017, McDonald presented a documentary called An Hour to Catch a Killer, and both Death Row 2018 with Trevor McDonald, and James Bulger: A Mother's Story with Trevor McDonald in February 2018, Martin Luther King by Trevor McDonald in March, and Trevor McDonald: Return To South Africa that June. In September 2018, he presented To Catch a Serial Killer with Trevor McDonald, Trevor McDonald and the Killer Nurse the following month, Fred & Rose West: The Real Story with Trevor McDonald in February 2019, and Babes in the Wood in March 2019.

In January 2021, McDonald presented a two-part documentary called And Finally… with Trevor McDonald. In May 2021, McDonald co-presented a one-hour documentary called Trevor McDonald & Charlene White: Has George Floyd Changed Britain? with Charlene White. McDonald presented The Killing of PC Harper: A Wife's Story on 17 March 2022, and Pride of Britain: A Windrush Special in October 2023.

== Other work and media appearances ==
McDonald was the subject of This Is Your Life in January 1990, and was a guest on Desert Island Discs in April 1994. In early 1996, McDonald presented the six-part BBC Radio 2 series Kalso! Calypso about Caribbean music, and Across the White Line on BBC Radio 5 Live about Black British football players throughout history. In December 1996, McDonald presented the "Hogmanay at the Palace" from Scone Palace. He also presented the 1997 radio documentary series Paths of Inspiration on the world's influential black people, and the 1998 five-part Radio 2 series The Long Voyage Home on the influence of the Windrush immigrants on British society. McDonald narrated the 2000 Radio 2 documentary The Forgotten Volunteers on the Asian and black soldiers who helped Britain in both world wars.

McDonald was the presenter of the National Television Awards from 1996 to 2008, and hosted the television series Undercover Customs, which created reconstructions of major HM Customs and Excise investigations in the United Kingdom. On 21 April 2006, McDonald presented an episode of the BBC One satirical quiz Have I Got News for You. McDonald was formerly chancellor of London South Bank University, serving in the role from November 1999 to 2012. He also has intimate ties with King's College School in Wimbledon, a London day school, where he is now a governor. McDonald authored biographies of the cricketers Viv Richards and Clive Lloyd. He has worked as an editor of poetry anthologies, was the author of a weekly poetry anthology column in The Daily Telegraph, and writes a column for Saga Magazine. His autobiography, Fortunate Circumstances, was published in 1993, and his cricket-inspired memoir On Cricket in 2024.

Lenny Henry's comic character Trevor McDoughnut on the TV show Tiswas is a parody of McDonald. The real McDonald made an appearance on an edition of the show and took Henry's place in the sketch, being soaked with the customary bucket of water at the climax. McDonald was also parodied by Rory Bremner, in blackface.

McDonald performed live in Hyde Park in June 1996 with the Who, as the newsreader in the group's staging of their rock opera, Quadrophenia. In 1997, he was made chairman of the Better English Campaign steering group to encourage the improved use of English in both verbal and written communication in school, and assisted in the launch of its campaign Better English, Better Job to help school leavers improve their communication skills, job applications and practising job interviews with employers. McDonald was the presenter of the Classic Brit Awards in 2000. Five years later, he was appointed an honorary vice president of Vision Aid Overseas. McDonald has appeared in advertising campaigns for Vision Express and McVitie's.

In June 2007, McDonald hosted the new ITV version of This Is Your Life, Simon Cowell being the programme's "victim". From June to August 2007, McDonald presented the satirical panel show News Knight with Sir Trevor McDonald on ITV1. In August 2010, McDonald conducted a live on-stage interview with Archbishop Desmond Tutu at Fairfield Halls in Croydon at an event entitled An Audience with Desmond Tutu. He was appointed deputy president of Surrey County Cricket Club in 2012, and served as the club's president from 2013 to 2014. In 2014, McDonald presented a media training course entitled "Deal with the Media with Sir Trevor McDonald".

He presented the four-part Sunday evening radio series Sir Trevor McDonald's Headliners on Classic FM in mid-2020. In 2021, McDonald narrated the WaterAid animated advertisement about a young girl from Madagascar and drew attention to global water shortages. He presented a special edition of Countdown that September as part of Channel 4's Black To Front Day. That same year, McDonald appeared as the titular character in E4's revival of GamesMaster, and presented a week of The Classic FM Concert in March 2022. In November 2022, as part of the game show's 40th anniversary, McDonald was a guest presenter on Countdown. In March 2024, McDonald was the walking partner in the second episode of Perfect Pub Walks with Bill Bailey.

In June 2024, The Guardian reported that McDonald had been featured in an advertisement to promote the planned UK government sale of shares in NatWest to the public (which had been announced in the March budget). Because one of McDonald's conditions was that he did not want to directly tell people to buy shares, the strapline for the advert was "Are you in?". The campaign had to be suspended after the announcement of the 2024 general election.

== Awards ==
McDonald holds honorary degrees of either doctor of laws or doctor of letters from the University of Plymouth, the Open University, Liverpool John Moores University, the Southampton Institute, the University of the West Indies, and Kingston University. He was named Newscaster of the Year by the Television and Radio Industries Club on four occasions in 1993, 1997, 1999, and 2009. McDonald was awarded the Royal Television Society (RTS) Gold Medal "for outstanding contribution to television news" in 1998, and in the following year, received the Richard Dimbleby Award from the British Academy of Film and Television Arts (BAFTA). In 2004, McDonald was one of 100 Great Black Britons in a poll taken after the BBC's 100 Greatest Britons failed to include any Black Britons. He was voted 31st in TV's 50 Greatest Stars poll by ITV in 2006.

He was appointed Knight Bachelor in the 1999 Birthday Honours for his services to broadcasting and journalism, having previously been appointed Officer of the Order of the British Empire (OBE) in the 1992 New Year Honours. McDonald was awarded with the National Television Award for Special Recognition in 2003, the RTS Award for Lifetime Achievement in 2005, and was inducted into the CBU Caribbean Media Hall of Fame in the same year. He was appointed a deputy lieutenant of Greater London in November 2006. McDonald received a BAFTA Fellowship at the 2011 British Academy Television Awards.

== Personal life ==
McDonald was married to his first wife Beryl from 1964 to 1985, and in 1986 married his second wife Josephine McCann, an ITN production assistant, from whom he separated amicably in 2020. There were two children of the first marriage and one of the second.

McDonald is a member of the All England Lawn Tennis and Croquet Club. He is a friend of Cliff Richard.

Academic offices
Preceded by Christopher McLaren	Chancellor of London South Bank University; 1999–2012	Succeeded by Richard Farleigh
