= 9th National Television Awards =

British awards ceremony in 2003

- Date: 28 October 2003
- Location: Royal Albert Hall, London
- Country: United Kingdom
- Presented by: Various
- Hosted by: Trevor McDonald
- Website: http://www.nationaltvawards.com/

Television/radio coverage
- Network: ITV

The 9th National Television Awards ceremony was held at the Royal Albert Hall on 28 October 2003 and was hosted by Sir Trevor McDonald, who at the end of the ceremony, received the Special Recognition Award from the then Prime Minister Tony Blair.

== Awards ==
Category	Winner	Also nominated
Most Popular Actor	Shane Richie (Alfie Moon, EastEnders)	Brian Capron (Richard Hillman, Coronation Street); David Jason (DI Jack Frost, A Touch of Frost); Jason Merrells (Gavin Ferraday, Cutting It); Martin Clunes (William Shawcross, William and Mary)
Most Popular Actress	Jessie Wallace (Kat Slater, EastEnders)	Amanda Burton (Sam Ryan, Silent Witness); Amanda Redman (Alison Braithwaite, At Home with the Braithwaites); Sarah Parish (Allie Henshall, Cutting It); Suranne Jones (Karen McDonald, Coronation Street)
Most Popular Drama	A Touch of Frost (ITV)	Bad Girls (ITV); Cutting It (BBC One); The Bill (ITV)
Most Popular Serial Drama	EastEnders (BBC One)	Coronation Street (ITV); Emmerdale (ITV); Hollyoaks (Channel 4)
Most Popular Entertainment Programme	Ant & Dec's Saturday Night Takeaway (ITV)	Friday Night with Jonathan Ross (BBC One); The Osbournes (Channel 4/MTV); V Graham Norton (Channel 4)
Most Popular Reality Programme	I'm a Celebrity... Get Me Out of Here! (ITV)	Big Brother (Channel 4); Jamie's Kitchen (Channel 4); SAS – Are You Tough Enough? (Channel 4)
Most Popular Entertainment Presenter	Ant & Dec	Davina McCall; Graham Norton; Jonathan Ross
Most Popular Quiz Programme Presented by Cat Deeley	Who Wants to Be a Millionaire? (ITV)	A Question of Sport (BBC One); Have I Got News for You (BBC One); The Weakest Link (BBC Two); They Think It's All Over (BBC One)
Most Popular Comedy Programme	My Family (BBC One)	Cold Feet (ITV); Friends (Channel 4/NBC); Last of the Summer Wine (BBC)
Most Popular Factual Programme	GMTV (ITV)	A Life of Grime (BBC One); Antiques Roadshow (BBC One); Bargain Hunt (BBC One)
Most Popular Comedy Performer	James Nesbitt (Cold Feet)	Alistair McGowan (Alistair McGowan's Big Impression); Dawn French (Wild West); Robert Lindsay (My Family)
Most Popular Newcomer	Nigel Harman (EastEnders)	Charley Webb (Emmerdale); Daniel MacPherson (The Bill); Kate Ford (Coronation Street); Zoe Taylor (The Royal)
Special Recognition Award	Sir Trevor McDonald	
