= National Television Award for Special Recognition =

Annual British television award

- Country: United Kingdom
- First award: 1995
- Currently held by: Alan Carr

The National Television Award for Special Recognition is an award presented annually by the National Television Awards (NTAs). It is considered the most prestigious award given out in the ceremony and is awarded to people or programmes that have made a significant contribution to British television over a number of years. It is the only award at the NTAs that is not voted for by the general public.

== History ==
The Special Recognition Award has been given in every ceremony since the beginning of the National Television Awards, with the exception of 2014, in which it was substituted by the Landmark Award. The first recipient in 1995 was Julie Goodyear. In 2020, Sir Michael Palin used his acceptance speech to pay tribute to his Monty Python co-star Terry Jones, who had died a week earlier.

== Winners ==
Year	Winner
1995	Julie Goodyear
1996	David Jason
1997	Robson Green
1998	John Thaw
1999	Michael Barrymore
2000	Chris Tarrant
2001	Des O'Connor
2002	Ant & Dec
2003	Sir Trevor McDonald
2004	Caroline Quentin
2005	Jamie Oliver
2006	Sir David Attenborough
2007	Jeremy Clarkson
2008	Simon Cowell
2010	Stephen Fry
2011	Bruce Forsyth
2012	Jonathan Ross
2013	Joanna Lumley
2014	Ant & Dec
2015	David Tennant
2016	Sir Billy Connolly
2017	Graham Norton
2018	Paul O'Grady: For the Love of Dogs
2019	David Dimbleby
2020	Sir Michael Palin
2021	Line of Duty
2022	Sir Lenny Henry
2023	Sarah Lancashire
2024	Davina McCall
2025	Wallace & Gromit
2026	Alan Carr
