= 1929 County Championship =

Cricket competition

- Cricket format: First-class cricket
- Tournament format: League system
- Champions: Nottinghamshire (2nd title)

The 1929 County Championship was the 36th officially organised running of the County Championship. Nottinghamshire County Cricket Club won the championship title for the second time.

A new method of deciding the Championship was introduced where all counties played 28 matches with the team with the most points being declared winners instead of the previous system of calculating the percentage of points gained against possible points available.

== Table ==
- Eight points were awarded for a win
- Four points were awarded for a tie
- Five points for the team leading after the first innings of a drawn match
- Three points for the team losing after the first innings of a drawn match
- Four points for the teams if tied after the first innings of a drawn match
- Four points for a no result on first innings (after more than six hours playing time)
- If the weather reduces a match to less than six hours and there has not been a result on first innings then the match shall be void.

County Championship table
Team	Pld	W	L	DWF	DLF	NR	Pts
Nottinghamshire	28	14	2	4	6	2	158
Lancashire	28	12	3	6	6	1	148
Yorkshire	28	10	2	9	5	2	148
Gloucestershire	28	15	6	1	4	2	145
Sussex	28	13	6	7	2	0	145
Middlesex	28	12	7	6	3	0	135
Derbyshire	28	10	6	8	3	1	133
Kent	28	12	8	6	2	0	132
Leicestershire	28	9	6	9	4	0	129
Surrey	28	8	7	5	6	2	115
Hampshire	28	8	10	0	8	2	96
Essex	28	6	9	3	9	1	94
Northamptonshire	28	7	13	2	6	0	84
Warwickshire	28	5	13	4	5	1	79
Somerset	28	3	17	5	3	0	58
Worcestershire	28	2	15	3	6	2	57
Glamorgan	28	3	19	3	3	0	48
