= Undercover Customs =

British true crime TV series (1997–1999)

Undercover Customs is a television series produced by Granada Television for ITV which consisted of dramatic reconstructions of some of the largest real-life smuggling incidents based on the official records of Her Majesty's Customs and Excise in the United Kingdom. The show ran for two series and consisted of 13 episodes in total. The series ran from 10 July 1997 to 1 March 1999.

The series was presented by Sir Trevor McDonald and was supplemented by genuine surveillance footage and exclusive interviews with the Customs Officers responsible for the investigations of the organised smuggling rings, and also the witnesses and informants who helped crack each case. The 1998 series was produced by Mike Kleinsteuber who also directed two of the programmes.

== Episodes ==
The episodes and original air dates are as follows:

- Operation Begonia (10/07/1997)
- Operation Green Ice (17/07/1997)
- Operation Babysitter (24/07/1997)
- Operation Suntempest (31/07/1997)
- Operation Carla II (07/08/1997)
- Operation Klondyke (14/08/1997)
- Operation Bypass (16/04/1998)
- Operation Oltet (23/04/1998)
- Operation Fluke (30/04/1998)
- Operation Escape (07/05/1998)
- Operation Barbecue (14/05/1998)
- Operation Crux (21/05/1998)
- Undercover Customs (01/03/1999)
