= Stephen Howlett =

Stephen Howlett

Stephen William Howlett CBE DL was formerly chief executive of Peabody, one of London's oldest and largest housing associations. He was chief executive between 2004 and July 2017 and was appointed to the Peabody Board on 18 May 2011. He also chairs the board – known as the court – of the University of Greenwich and presides over its graduation ceremonies as pro chancellor. Howlett was made a 2017 Honorary Fellow of the Royal Institute of British Architects (RIBA).

== Early life ==
Howlett was born on 18 November 1951 and brought up in Lavenham, Suffolk. He attended King Edward VI grammar school in Bury St. Edmunds and later Thames Polytechnic in Woolwich where he graduated in Humanities, specialising in Modern History.

== Career ==
Before joining Peabody, Howlett was chief executive of Amicus Group, which became AmicusHorizon Group in 2006, and Swale Housing Association. Both organisations are now part of AmicusHorizon.

He was a board member of Asset Skills and a member of The Guardian's Housing Network Advisory Panel. He was also a member of the Residential Committee of the British Property Federation, one of the Mayor's Leaders for London on sustainability and an adviser to the Mayor's Infrastructure Delivery Board.

Howlett was chair of the G15, the group of London's 15 largest housing associations, from June 2009 to June 2011. Among the initiatives launched during his two-year tenure were the pilot London Moves scheme to enable social housing residents to move to sustain or take-up work, and a report produced by the London School of Economics which made the case for investment in affordable housing in London. In support of the report, Boris Johnson, mayor of London, said it "make[s] the most compelling case for the government to concentrate its housing programme where it will deliver the greatest returns for all."

As well as affordable housing, education, and skills, Stephen has a particular interest in design and architecture. He is a Trustee of Open-City, London's leading architecture education organisation and organiser of Open House London.

=== Peabody career ===
Howlett presided over notable developments at Peabody including:

- The completion of a London-wide refurbishment programme to ensure Peabody's housing stock meets the Decent Homes Standard
- The issue of a £200 million public bond in 2011 and the issue of a public bond for £350 million in 2013
- The purchase of The Crown Estate's London housing properties
- The growth of Peabody's development pipeline - there are plans to build an average of 1,000 homes a year over the next four years
- The acquisition of Gallions Housing Association, Trust Thamesmead and Tilfen Land in 2014 to further the regeneration of Thamesmead in SE London
