= Henry R. Hall =

British Scout leader and philanthropist (1917–2012)

Lieutenant-Colonel Henry Robert Hall

Personal details
- Born: May 25, 1917 Dulwich, London, England
- Died: October 25, 2012 (aged 95)
- Known for: Vice-president of The Scout Association; founder of the Robert Hall Foundation
- Awards: Bronze Wolf Award; OBE

Lieutenant-Colonel Henry Robert "Bill" Hall (25 May 1917 – 25 October 2012) was a British Scout leader and philanthropist. He served as a vice-president of The Scout Association and was active in supporting international Scouting, including post-Cold War initiatives in Europe.

== Early life ==
Hall was born in Dulwich, south London.

== Scouting career ==
Hall became a Scout in 1930 and remained involved in the movement for decades.

He founded the 48th Camberwell Scout Group in 1937 and later held commissioner roles, including in Greater London and Jersey.

In 2007, he received the Bronze Wolf Award, the highest distinction of the World Organization of the Scout Movement.

== Public appointments and honours ==
Hall was commissioned as a Deputy Lieutenant of Greater London in 1967.

He was appointed an Officer of the Order of the British Empire (OBE) in the 1983 New Year Honours for services to the Scout Association in Jersey.

== Philanthropy ==
In February 1983, Hall and his wife Margaret Lucy Hall established the Robert Hall Foundation as a Jersey charitable trust to support charitable giving, including youth-related causes.

== Personal life and death ==
Hall died on 25 October 2012, aged 95.
