= Rothesay (insurer) =

British pension insurer

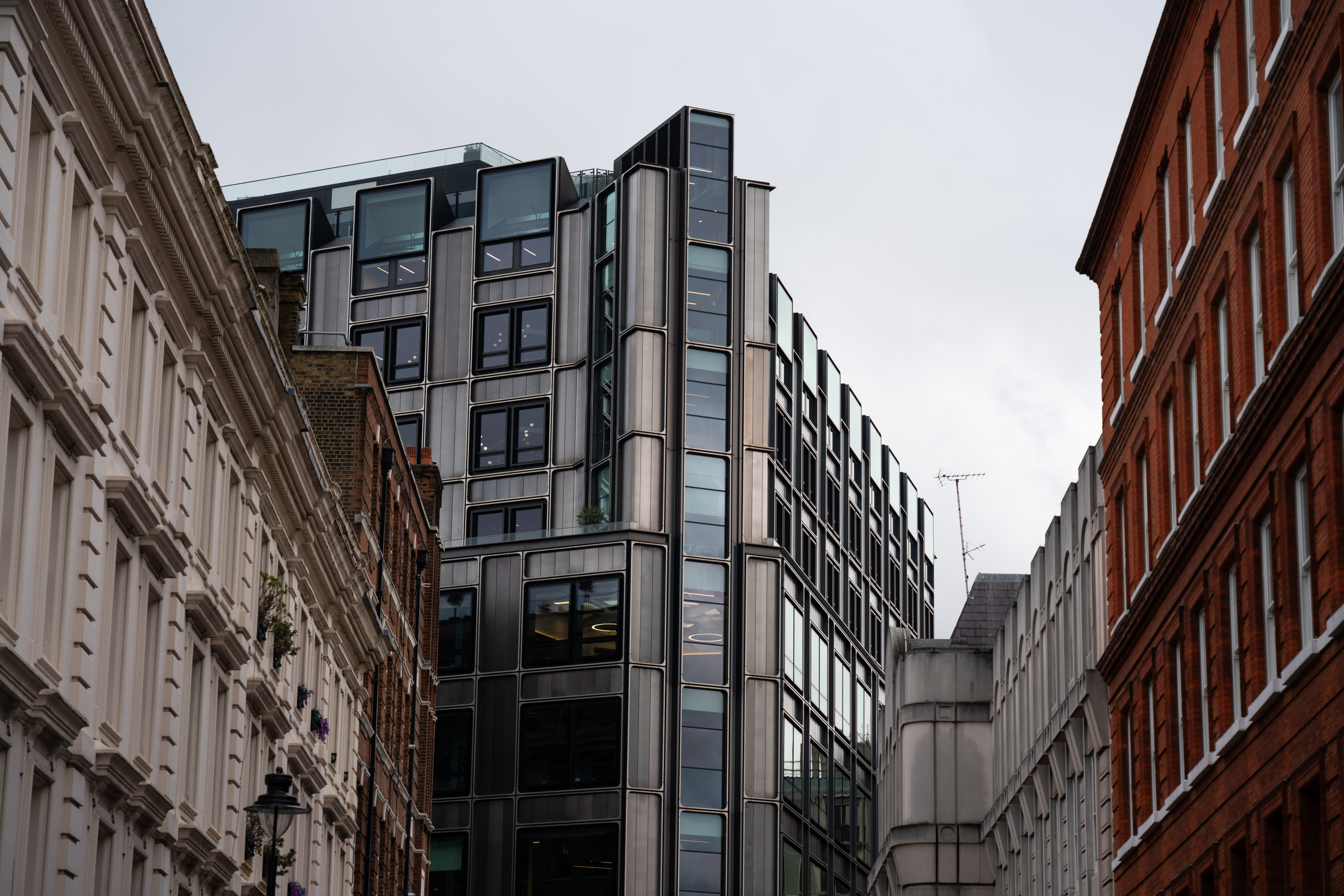
- The Post Building in London.
- Type: Private
- Industry: Insurance
- Founded: 2007; 19 years ago
- Founder: Goldman Sachs
- Headquarters: The Post Building, 100 Museum Street, London WC1A 1PB, London, United Kingdom
- Key people: Tom Pearce (CEO); Bruce Carnegie-Brown (chair)
- Products: Bulk purchase annuities; In-force annuity portfolio acquisitions
- Total assets: £70.7 billion (AUM, 31 December 2024)
- Owners: GIC (50.2%, 31 December 2024); MassMutual (47.6%, 31 December 2024); Management and employees (remainder, 31 December 2024)
- Website: rothesay.com

Rothesay, formerly Rothesay Life, is a British pension insurer that writes bulk annuities for defined benefit pension schemes and acquires in-force annuity portfolios. It was founded in 2007 as a subsidiary of Goldman Sachs. In 2020, existing shareholders GIC and MassMutual acquired Blackstone's stake in the group.

As of 31 December 2024, Rothesay reported £70.7 billion of assets under management and a group Solvency Capital Requirement coverage ratio of 261 percent. In the same update, Rothesay reported that GIC held 50.2 percent of the company and MassMutual held 47.6 percent, with the remainder held by management and employees.

== History ==
Rothesay was founded in 2007 as a subsidiary of Goldman Sachs as a specialist annuity insurer. In 2008 it completed its first pension buy-out transaction, covering the defined benefit pension scheme of The Rank Group.

In 2010, Rothesay agreed to acquire specialist bulk annuity insurer Paternoster, and completed the deal in January 2011, adding a large in-force annuity book.

In 2013, Goldman Sachs agreed to sell a majority stake in Rothesay to funds managed by Blackstone and GIC, with MassMutual acquiring a minority holding; the transaction completed in December 2013. Goldman exited in 2017, then Blackstone sold its interest in 2020 which left GIC and MassMutual as equal 49% shareholders.

In 2014 the European Commission approved Rothesay's acquisition of MetLife Assurance Limited in the United Kingdom. Rothesay later reported that the acquisition completed in May 2014.

In 2016 Rothesay agreed to acquire a portfolio of annuities from Aegon's UK business. In August 2017, Austria's Financial Market Authority said that Zurich Assurance Ltd had transferred some life insurance contracts to Rothesay Life plc.

In 2019, a proposed transfer of about £12 billion of Prudential UK annuities was initially refused by the High Court. The Court of Appeal set that decision aside in 2020 and the High Court sanctioned the transfer on 24 November 2021 with an effective date of 15 December 2021.

In 2020 the company rebranded from Rothesay Life to Rothesay. In September 2022, co-founder Tom Pearce became chief executive, succeeding Addy Loudiadis.

In March 2024 Rothesay agreed to acquire Scottish Widows' in-force bulk annuity portfolio from Lloyds Banking Group. The High Court approved the transfer on 14 May 2025 and completion took effect on 11 June 2025.

== Operations ==
Rothesay buys pension schemes, often of the defined benefit type, from British employers who wish to remove the scheme's liabilities and risks from their accounts.

== Financials ==
As at 31 December 2024 the group reported assets under management of £70.7 billion and a group Solvency Capital Requirement coverage ratio of 261 percent.

== Credit ratings ==
As of 2025 Rothesay Life plc is rated A+ for Insurer Financial Strength by Fitch and A2 for Insurance Financial Strength by Moody’s.

== Notable transactions ==
The company has completed a number of large transactions in the UK bulk annuity market. Industry data reported record annual volumes in 2024 and identified Rothesay among the largest writers of new premiums that year.

- 2008: Buy-out of the Rank Group pension scheme worth about £700 million.
- 2011: Acquisition of Paternoster, adding a large back-book of annuities to the group.
- 2014–2015: Acquisition of MetLife Assurance Limited and subsequent integration following EU merger clearance.
- 2015–2017: Zurich UK immediate annuities. Reinsurance of about £1.2 billion followed by a 2017 Part VII transfer.
- 2016–2017: Aegon UK annuity book. Part VII transfer approved in 2017 for about 187,000 policyholders with liabilities of roughly £6.4 billion.
- 2019: National Grid UK Pension Scheme buy-in of £2.8 billion, followed by a further £800 million buy-in in 2020.
- 2019: Asda Group Pension Scheme buy-in of £3.8 billion covering about 12,000 members.
- 2019: Allied Domecq Pension Fund buy-in of £3.8 billion.
- 2019: GEC 1972 Pension Scheme buy-out of £4.7 billion for the Telent-sponsored scheme, then the largest UK buy-out to date.
- 2021: Part VII transfer of approximately £12 billion of annuities from The Prudential Assurance Company to Rothesay, effective 15 December 2021.
- 2025: High Court approval of the Part VII transfer of Scottish Widows’ annuity portfolio to Rothesay in May 2025. Completion followed on 11 June 2025.
- 2025: Acquisition of HSBC's €6.7 billion French home loan portfolio as part of a consortium with CCF.

Rothesay has also undertaken smaller portfolio actions, including the disposal of an Irish annuity portfolio to Monument Re that was expected to transfer to Laguna Life following reinsurance and court approval processes.

== See also ==
- Defined benefit pension plan
- Annuity
- Solvency II
- Prudential Regulation Authority
