= The Wheeltappers and Shunters Social Club =

British TV variety show (1974–1977)

- Genre: Variety/Cabaret
- Presented by: Bernard Manning; Colin Crompton
- Country of origin: United Kingdom
- No. of seasons: 6
- No. of episodes: 48

Production
- Producer: Johnnie Hamp
- Production company: Granada Television

Original release
- Network: ITV
- Release: 13 April 1974 – 19 June 1977

The Wheeltappers and Shunters Social Club is a British television variety show created and produced by Johnnie Hamp for Granada Television. It ran for seven series from 1974 to 1977, with the final series retitled At The Wheeltappers. It was set in a fictional working men's club in the North of England and was hosted by comedian Colin Crompton as the club's chairman. The show's compere was usually Bernard Manning, who as well as telling jokes and introducing acts often started and finished the show with a song. Crompton was frequently the butt of his jokes, acting as Manning's stooge.

The set was arranged like a club, so that, rather than being arranged in terraced seating the studio audience would be seated around tables and be served beer and snacks, join in a singalong and otherwise engage in audience participation.

Crompton, as chairman of the club, would sit at a small table in the corner watching proceedings with apparent lack of interest. He had a large manual fire bell which he would wind and sound purportedly to attract the audience's attention after an act, announcing various notices from "the Committee" (that is, the officials of the social club of which he was chairman), usually misdemeanours by the club's members or the committee itself. For example: "On behalf of the Committee, I should like to tell you we made a mistake in offering the raffle prize of a diving suit. It is in fact a divan suite."

Special episodes were broadcast on New Year's Eve 1974 and 1975.

== Acts ==
The show featured acts regularly seen on the Northern club circuit, and well-established performers who did well in theatres and clubs, but did not succeed so well on British television, such as 1950s crooner Johnnie Ray. It also gave newer acts their first television exposure, such as Cannon & Ball, The Grumbleweeds, The Dooleys and Paul Daniels. Some artists to appear on the show included:

- Winifred Atwell
- Alvin Stardust
- The Bachelors
- Brotherhood of Man
- The Crickets
- Bill Haley & His Comets
- The Dubliners
- Jim Bowen
- Frank Carson
- David Copperfield
- Design
- Stuart Damon
- The Three Degrees
- Lonnie Donegan
- Karl Denver
- Freddie Garrity
- Buddy Greco
- Kathy Kirby
- The Krankies
- Susan Maughan
- George Melly and John Chilton's Feetwarmers
- Nana Mouskouri
- Roy Orbison
- Lyn Paul
- Terri Rogers
- George Roper
- Tessie O'Shea
- Malcolm Roberts
- The Kaye Sisters
- The Dooleys
- Gene Pitney
- Lena Zavaroni
- Dukes and Lee
- Paul Daniels
- Mrs Mills
- Max Wall
- Little and Large
- Patsy Ann Scott

The show was produced by Johnnie Hamp at Granada Studios in Manchester, although one episode (Series 2, ep. 2) was filmed at the Layton Institute, Blackpool.

Actress Liz Dawn appeared as a waitress before she became more famous for her role as Vera Duckworth in Coronation Street (also recorded by Granada in Manchester).

A clip from the show can be seen in the film 24 Hour Party People (2002), where Shaun Ryder, in his formative years, is seen watching Karl Denver perform "The Lion Sleeps Tonight" (a.k.a. "Wimoweh").

The music video to Noel Gallagher's High Flying Birds' single "Black Star Dancing" depicts the band performing on the show.

The series was, for at least part of its run, confined to a midnight slot by London Weekend Television and Southern Television, who felt it did not suit their, perceived, more upmarket demographics.

In December 2024 the UK channel Talking Pictures TV began broadcasting the series.

== Origins of the name ==
Wheeltappers and shunters are railway workers. They were commonly employed by steam railways in Britain and elsewhere, but are still found both on British railways and in Eastern Europe.

Although often called "working men's clubs", most such clubs admitted the wives and other women family of the working man, at least some days of the week. This is echoed in the programme's audience being as much female as male.

== Episodes ==
=== Series 1 ===
- Episode 1: original air date – 13 April 1974
  - Ukrainian Cossack Brotherhood
  - Lambert and Ross
  - Barbara Law
  - La Vivas
  - Freddie Garrity
  - Tessie O'Shea
- Episode 2: original air date – 20 April 1974
  - Bill Haley and his Comets
  - The Krankies
  - The Three Degrees
  - Ronnie Hilton
  - Brandy di Frank
  - Martin and Sylvia Konyot
- Episode 3: original air date – 27 April 1974
  - Stephane Grappelli and Diz Disley Trio
  - Little and Large
  - Tony Brutus
  - The Barcias
  - Terri Rogers
  - Lonnie Donegan
- Episode 4: original air date – 4 May 1974
  - The Wedgewoods
  - Beryl Calvert
  - Jimmy Jewel
  - Marie
  - Valentino
  - Johnnie Wager (Justin Jones, Union Man)
  - Buddy Greco
- Episode 5: original air date – 11 May 1974
  - Splinter
  - Frank Ifield
  - Norman Collier
  - Kathy Kirby
  - Jackie Allen & Barbara
  - Victor Burnett and June
- Episode 6: original air date – 18 May 1974
  - Springfield Revival
  - Cannon and Ball
  - Julie Rogers
  - Eric Delaney
  - Tina Townsley
  - The Bachelors
- Episode 7: original air date – 25 May 1974
  - Mrs Mills
  - Dave and Amos
  - Eve Boswell
  - Fivepenny Piece
  - Peter Wheeler (Ernest Farringdon, schoolmaster at 'local Barnsby Comprehensive')
  - The Leaways
  - Gene Pitney

=== Series 2 ===
- Episode 8: original air date – 27 July 1974
  - P. J. Proby
  - Brotherhood of Man
  - Franklyn James
  - Los Tres Hermanos
  - Alex Sisters
  - Russ Conway
- Episode 9: original air date – 3 August 1974
  - Amazing Bavarian Stompers
  - David Copperfield
  - Barbara Sharon
  - Susan Maughan
  - Paul Wynter
  - Winifred Atwell
- Episode 10: original air date – 10 August 1974
  - Remember This
  - Duggie Brown
  - The Multichords
  - The Playmates
  - Roy Orbison
- Episode 11: original air date – 17 August 1974
  - Aphrodite and the Grecian Kings
  - Los Magicos
  - The Crickets
  - The Grumbleweeds
  - Yana
  - Johnnie Ray
- Episode 12: original air date – 24 August 1974. The episode was filmed at the Layton Institute due to the 'club' being on a day trip to Blackpool.
  - Shep's Banjo Boys
  - Dave Evans
  - Rain featuring Stephanie De Sykes
  - Colin Crompton singing as the club's chairman
  - Malcolm Roberts
  - Johnny Hackett
  - Kaye Sisters
- Episode 13: original air date – 31 August 1974
  - The Wheeltappers Waiters
  - Syd Francis
  - Peter Gordeno
  - Dermot O'Brien
  - Wilma Reading
  - Enrico
  - Marty Wilde
- Episode 14: original air date – 7 September 1974
  - Morton Fraser and his Harmonica Gang
  - Mike Reid
  - David Whitfield
  - Marion Ryan
  - Max Wall
  - Stuart Damon

Special:

- Episode 15: original air date – 31 December 1974
  - Design
  - Charlie Williams
  - Kristine Sparkle
  - The Brother Lees
  - Matt Monro
  - Freddie Garrity, Frank Carson (uncredited) and Duggie Brown (uncredited) as one comedy act

=== Series 3 ===
- Episode 16: original air date – 15 February 1975
  - Karl Denver Trio
  - George Roper
  - The Platters
  - Ronnie Dukes and Ricki Lee
- Episode 17: original air date – 22 February 1975
  - The Vernons
  - Ray Fell
  - Elaine Delmar
  - Paul Daniels
  - Alvin Stardust
- Episode 18: original air date – 1 March 1975
  - The Settlers
  - Johnnie More
  - Bert Weedon
  - Keeley Ford
  - Steve Sabre
  - Jackie Trent and Tony Hatch
- Episode 19: original air date – 8 March 1975
  - The Flirtations
  - The Krankies
  - George Melly with John Chilton's Feetwarmers
  - Richard and Lara Jarmain
  - Joe "Mr Piano" Henderson
- Episode 20: original air date – 15 March 1975
  - Los Reales Del Paraguay
  - Bobby Knutt
  - Mothers Pride
  - Helen Shapiro
  - The Turners
  - Roger Whittaker with Saffron
- Episode 21: original air date – 29 March 1975
  - Cool Breeze
  - Frank Carson
  - Kenny Ball and his Jazzmen
  - Marti Caine
  - Howard Keel
- Episode 22: original air date – 5 April 1975
  - Barbara Sharon
  - In Three Minds
  - Jerry Stevens
  - Vintage Syncopators
  - Itojo Kumano
  - Mike Carter
  - Bernard Manning
- Episode 23
  - Terri Rogers
  - Alan Randall
  - Francis Yip
  - Eddie Flanagan
  - Tony Christie

=== Series 4 ===
- Episode 24: original air date – 19 July 1975
  - Rivendell
  - Paul Daniels
  - Royal Polynesian Revue
  - Gene Pitney
- Episode 25: original air date – 26 July 1975
  - Wild Honey
  - Dustin Gee
  - Julie Rogers
  - Dukes and Lee
- Episode 26: original air date – 2 August 1975
  - New World
  - David Copperfield
  - Valentino
  - Jimmy Marshall
  - Ronnie Hilton (part duet with Bernard Manning)
- Episode 27: original air date – 9 August 1975
  - Terry Lightfoot and his band
  - Stu Francis
  - Sheila Southern
  - Pat Mooney
  - Wee Willie Harris
- Episode 28: original air date – 16 August 1975
  - The Chants
  - George Roper
  - Lorne Lesley
  - The Hermits
  - Jim Bowen
  - Joe "Mr Piano" Henderson
- Episode 29: original air date – 23 August 1975
  - Ray Ellington
  - Frank Carson
  - The Grumbleweeds
- Episode 30: original air date – 30 August 1975
  - Broken Hearts
  - Jimmy Jones (was edited out for TPTV broadcast repeat of 22 June 2025)
  - Miki and Griff
  - Lyn Paul
  - Bernard Manning

Special:

- Episode 31: original air date – 31 December 1975
  - Dawson Chance
  - Peter Gordeno
  - Mike Harding
  - Jim Bowen, Charlie Williams, George Roper, Duggie Brown and Frank Carson
  - Russ Conway

=== Series 5 ===
- Episode 32: original air date – 15 May 1976
  - The Caravelles
  - Eddie Flanagan
  - Judy Moxon
  - Josef Locke
- Episode 33: original air date – 22 May 1976
  - The Vernons
  - Mike Burton
  - Alex Welsh and his band
  - Rondart and Jeanne
  - Roger Whittaker and Saffron
- Episode 34: original air date – 29 May 1976
  - Madame
  - Bernie Clifton
  - The Swinging Blue Jeans
  - Bernard Manning
- Episode 35: original air date – 5 June 1976. This episode presented the winners of the Club Mirror and National Club Charities' "National Club Acts Awards".
  - Pete Price (Compère of the Year)
  - Cannon and Ball
  - Mark Channing (Singer of the Year)
  - Paul Daniels
- Episode 36: original air date – 12 June 1976
  - Pete Price (Compère of the Year)
  - The Dooleys
  - Pat Mills
  - Tony Monopoly
  - Rob Murray
  - Lena Zavaroni
- Episode 37: original air date – 19 June 1976
  - Syd Lawrence and his orchestra, with vocalists:
    - Eleanor Keenan
    - Bernard Manning
    - Roy Marsden
- Episode 38: original air date – 26 June 1976
  - Jingles
  - Neville King
  - Samantha Jones
  - Chris North and Jill

Special:

- Episode 39: original air date – 23 February 1977. Acts from the National Club Acts Awards 1977:
  - Greengage (Best Group)
  - Lambert and Ross (Best Comedy Act)
  - Carlo Santanna (Best Male Vocalist)
  - Chris North and Jill (Best Novelty Act)
  - Kim Davis (Best Female Vocalist)
  - Mike Stand Douglas (Best Comedian of the Year)
- Featuring the Final of Miss Nightclub 1977 with Patrick Mower as interviewer, and judges:
  - Jim Dowd, editor of the Club Mirror
  - Julie Goodyear
  - Alvin Stardust
  - Timothy West
  - Cyril Smith
- and contestants:
  - Deirdre Greenland
  - Kay McDowall
  - Karen Davis
  - Julie Mockson
  - Toni Byrne (winner)
  - Ann Dunsford
  - Lindi Crago
  - Jackie Robinson

=== Series 6: At The Wheeltappers ===
Series 6 is a spin-off show called At The Wheeltappers, with a format similar to the original but having only one act for the whole show.

- Episode 40: original air date – 14 April 1977
  - Mike Harding
- Episode 41: original air date – 21 April 1977
  - Paul Daniels
- Episode 42: original air date – 28 April 1977
  - Bob Williamson
- Episode 43: original air date – 5 May 1977
  - The New Vaudeville Band
- Episode 44: original air date – 12 May 1977
  - The Dubliners
- Episode 45: original air date – 19 May 1977
  - Cannon and Ball
- Episode 46: original air date – 26 May 1977
  - Fivepenny Piece
- Episode 47: original air date – 2 June 1977
  - George Melly
- Episode 48: original air date – 9 June 1977

According to Talking Pictures Episode 47 was the end of the series (and the show). So Episode 48 might not exist.

== Reception ==
Leslie Halliwell wrote: "Attempt to do for club acts what Stars and Garters had done for pub entertainers, i.e. present them in a fictitious and larger-than-life club setting. Thanks to a droll running performance by Colin Crompton as the entertainments committee chairman and insults from ex-Comedians comic Bernard Manning it became popular viewing. There were also one or two special (e.g. New Year) editions and a seaside outing".

== DVD releases ==
The complete first series of The Wheeltappers and Shunters Social Club was released on DVD in September 2009 and the second series (including the New Year's Eve Special) was released in July 2010 with the complete third and fourth series being released in February and June 2011. The complete fifth series was released on 23 April 2012, followed by the complete sixth (and final) series. The format for the sixth series has changed, each episode being 30 minutes with just one major performer in each.
