= The Grumbleweeds Radio Show =

Comedy radio and TV show of the 1980s.

The Grumbleweeds' Radio Show
- Genre: Comedy
- Running time: 30 minutes
- Country of origin: United Kingdom
- Language: English
- Home station: BBC Radio 2
- Starring: Robin Colvill; Graham Walker; Maurice Lee; Albert Sutcliffe; Carl Sutcliffe
- Produced by: Mike Craig
- Original release: 1979 – 1991
- No. of series: 15

The Grumbleweeds' Radio Show is a comedy sketch show that aired for fifteen series between 1979 and 1988, starring The Grumbleweeds and broadcast on BBC Radio 2 (later repeated on BBC Radio 4). The show title was later shortened to The Grumbleweeds.

It also served as the name of a 1980s British television programme starring the group.

== On radio (1979-1991) ==
The radio programme was a mixture of fast-moving skits, impressions and sketches, linked by snatches of the band's signature tune "We Are the Grumbleweeds". Recurring sketches included 'Trouble at T'Mill' (a comedic parody of a working-class drama set in a Yorkshire mill at the turn of the 20th century), 'Oh Amanda' (a romantic soliloquy performed by Colvill to his fictional partner Amanda with a suitably humorous punchline) and a parody of Radio 4's Book at Bedtime, where a soft-spoken narrator would attempt to read a story in spite of mounting technical problems such as constantly failing transmitter power, and would end the sketch yelling at the top of his voice in order to be heard. A regular Family Grumbleweed sketch introduced the residents of Grumbleweed Towers and a revolving cast of assorted friends, neighbours and lunatics. The programmes were predominantly broadcast on BBC Radio 2 between 10pm and 11pm, with repeats on weekend lunchtimes.

Key characters included:

- Uncle Rubbish, a nostalgia buff, with his occasional feature "Tiny Tots' Teatime Toytime Time Time".
- Wilf "Gasmask" Grimshaw, who constantly wore a gas mask, apparently to stop him from picking his nose
- Perennially stressed housekeeper Freda Nattercan (catchphrase: "Oh, I just can't cope!"), her husband Adolph (catchphrase, a shout of: "I don't know!") and daughter Melanie (catchphrase: "Has anybody seen me teeth?")
- The stereotypically camp duo Ernest and Geoffrey (who were reinvented as agony aunts Viv and Trix when the series transferred to television)
- Fred Fibber, a pathological liar
- Uncle Nasty, an unpleasant character who would interrupt proceedings with threatening and sarcastic comments (catchphrase: "You get right up my nose you do, pal.")
- Jimmy Savile, Colvill's impersonation of television personality Jimmy Savile, who also came from Leeds.

The Grumbleweeds Radio Show won Best Radio Show Award in the Television and Radio Industries Awards of 1983, the same year that the group were given an ITV television series.

A half-hour Christmas special, Wilf In Santaland, broadcast on BBC Radio 2 on Christmas Day 1984, switched the usual quickfire sketch-based format for a traditional Christmas pantomime. The following three radio series, running from 1986 to 1988, were produced in a half-hour sitcom format, which was largely an extension of the Family Grumbleweed sketch from the earlier incarnation of the radio show, with scripts still mostly written by Mike Craig and often featuring cameos from other contemporary light entertainment favourites such as Mollie Sugden, Jimmy Cricket, Paul Shane and Stuart Hall. A number of new characters were introduced, amongst them the vagrant Ratface, the spluttering, lisping entrepreneur Sid Squeak and his partner-in-crime Stanley Bubble.

In late 1987, two members of the group - brothers Albert and Carl Sutcliffe - decided to leave in order to pursue other careers. The remaining trio secured a new radio slot, Someone and the Grumbleweeds, with sketches mostly written by ex-Morecambe and Wise scriptwriter Eddie Braben and featuring a different celebrity guest each week. This ran on BBC Radio 2 from 1989 to 1991, since when the group have had no regular radio series.

== On television (1983-1988) ==
Following an appearance on "The Video Entertainers" on 17 August 1982, the group made a pilot television programme, shown nationally by most ITV companies on 29 March 1983 by makers Granada Television, despite their radio show being produced by ITV's biggest rival, the BBC. Anglia, Grampian, Scottish and TSW broadcast the pilot a few days later.

Paradoxically retaining the same name as the radio programme and set in a mocked-up radio studio in order to build on the image the group had built up through radio, the television shows were geared toward a more family audience than the live stage show. The Grumbleweeds Radio Show was produced by Johnny Hamp of The Comedians fame, who retained the fast-moving sketch format and upped it a little, with thirty or more sketches per half-hour episode, interspersed with impressions and a selection of regular characters from the radio series. Comedy script writer/editor Barry Faulkner, who had worked on most of the BBC and ITV comedy sketch shows of the time, was brought in and contributions accepted for appraisal from any budding or working writers on an ad hoc basis in the beginning with contracts being given to those who hit the right spot. Sketches were generally performed in the studio, using hand-drawn backdrops produced by Granada's in-house designer Len Hannibal.

New characters introduced in the television show included:

- The Milky Bar Kid (played by a blinking, gurning Albert Sutcliffe with his false teeth removed)
- Hymie and Rachel, a stereotype Jewish couple
- Shamus O'Hooligan, a stereotype Irishman based heavily on the act of comedian Frank Carson
- Viv & Trix, agony aunts (largely the Ernest and Geoffrey characters from the radio series)
- Clair Voyant, a wizened old fortune teller
- Wally & Mandy, an old man (played by Carl Sutcliffe) and his young wife, played by actress Mandy Montgomery
- The Mystics, a husband-and-wife cabaret magic act whose male half Gilbert was perennially drunk
- Taxi Jim, closely based on Jim Ignatowski from the situation comedy Taxi
- Pam Hair, a poet closely based on Pam Ayres (but with a lot of facial hair)
- Sid Noxious, a punk rocker

A full first series of seven programmes followed on 12 May 1984, followed by a second series of seven on 13 April 1985 and a Christmas special. From the third series on 25 January 1986 the show was retitled "The Grumbleweeds Show", and ran for five episodes. The fourth series, comprising six shows, followed on 12 July the same year and the group enjoyed an hour long special celebrating 50 years of TV, on 7 October.

Additional regular performers included the "Grumblegirls" (models Sally Wilde, Tracey Dixon and Mandy Montgomery) who usually played overtly sexy female roles, while, as with Monty Python, the roles of older women would usually be played by the men (in drag).

Popular cabaret artists such as Madeline Bell made occasional guest appearances on the show, attempting to perform while being distracted by a cast of oddball characters who appeared on stage one by one. These included a myopic park-keeper (played by Robin) dribbling Pot Noodle down his chin, the Milky Bar Kid (Albert, who removed his dentures to play the character) and an outsized Demis Roussos (Maurice), wearing deely-boppers which, when pulled, would launch him into the air amid clouds of smoke.

The group played it straight for three or four minutes each week, performing songs generally written by Maurice or Carl (the band's two guitarists) with Robin on drums, Graham on bass guitar and Albert on keyboards, although the band often swapped instruments.

When the series returned on 18 April 1987, there were a number of changes to the format. The group filmed sketches on location in addition to the studio-based material. A new studio set, built in 1986 for the hour-long special, made a full time appearance and the group's self-performed theme song "We Are the Grumbleweeds" was replaced with a big band version. The Sutcliffe brothers decided to leave the group toward the end of the series, with their places taken by backing musicians for the final few shows. The final programme, a 45-minute special, was transmitted on 9 July 1988.

The TV series also spun off into a book, The Grumbleweeds Scrap Book (ISBN 0708831540), and a long-playing album of songs, Let The Good Times Roll (of which only two band-penned songs, "A Woman's Intuition" and "It's Party Time" appeared and had featured in the television series) was released on K-Tel Records in 1986. The programmes have yet to be released commercially.
