= Cannon and Ball's Playhouse =

- Country of origin: United Kingdom
- No. of series: 1
- No. of episodes: 2

Production
- Running time: 30 minutes
- Production company: Yorkshire Television

Original release
- Network: ITV
- Release: 24 September – 27 October 1990

Cannon and Ball's Playhouse is a sitcom featuring Cannon and Ball. Originally intended to be 6 episodes, only 2 ended up being made as ITV favoured Plaza Patrol.

== Cast ==
- Tommy Cannon ... Tommy Davenport
- Bobby Ball ... Bobby Barnes
- Sherrie Hewson ... Beryl Davenport
- Keith Marsh ... Alf
- Janet Rawson ... Julia
- Paula Ann Bland ... Heather
- Siobhan Finneran ... Carol
