= Cannon and Ball's Casino =

1990 UK variety TV show

- Genre: variety show
- Directed by: Graham Wetherell
- Presented by: Cannon and Ball
- Country of origin: United Kingdom
- No. of series: 1
- No. of episodes: 9 (plus unaired pilot)

Production
- Running time: 45 minutes
- Production company: Yorkshire Television

Original release
- Network: ITV
- Release: 19 May – 25 August 1990

Cannon and Ball's Casino (also known as Casino) is a short-lived variety programme hosted by Tommy Cannon and Bobby Ball. It was described as part comedy-show, part game-show and aired on Saturday evening at 6:10. The guests were entertainers such as Mike Osman, Gilbert O'Sullivan, Roxette and Big Country.

== Episodes ==
The series ran for 9 episodes. The show ran weekly for 7 episodes and then skipped 6 weeks before resuming its weekly schedule. In addition, there is an unaired pilot.

No.	Guests	Original release date
1	Roxette singing "It Must Have Been Love", Big Country signing "Save Me", and comedian Paul Squire.	19 May 1990
2	Halo James singing "Magic Hour", Dusty Springfield singing "Reputation", and magician Paul Zenon.	26 May 1990
3	Paul Young singing "Softly Whispering", Fuzzbox singing "Your Loss My Gain", and stand-up comedian Rob Newman.	2 June 1990
4	Beloved singing "Time After Time", Indecent Obsession singing "Say Goodbye", and comedian Bradley Walsh.	9 June 1990
5	The London Boys singing "Chapel of Love", Kim Wilde singing "Time", and comedian Chris Luby.	16 June 1990
6	River City People singing "California Dreaming", Tanita Tikaram singing "Thursday's Child" and comedian Mick Miller.	23 June 1990
7	Big Fun, Elkie Brooks and impressionist George Marshall.	30 June 1990
8	Gilbert O'Sullivan singing "Very Mention of Your Name", Jesus Jones singing "Info Freako" and magician John Lenahan.	18 August 1990
9	Leo Sayer singing "The Cool Touch", Hothouse Flowers singing "I Can See Clearly Now" and comedian Mike Osman.	25 August 1990
