= Norman Collier =

British comedian (1925–2013)

- Born: 25 December 1925; Hull, East Riding of Yorkshire, England
- Died: 14 March 2013 (aged 87); Brough, East Riding of Yorkshire, England
- Occupation: Comedian
- Years active: 1948–2013
- Spouse: Lucy Seddon (m. 1948)
- Children: 3

Norman Collier (25 December 1925 – 14 March 2013) was a British comedian who achieved popularity following television appearances in the 1970s. He was best known for his 'faulty microphone' routine and for his chicken impressions.

== Career and reputation ==
Collier was born in Hull, East Riding of Yorkshire, England, into the working-class family of Thomas and Mary (née Dowling) Collier on Christmas Day, 1925, weighing 15 lb 4 oz. He grew up in the centre of Hull as the eldest of eight children.

At age 17, Collier joined the Royal Navy and served as a gunner towards the end of the Second World War. After being demobilised he found work as a labourer. In 1948, while he was visiting Hull's Perth Street West club, an act failed to turn up, and Collier volunteered to fill in. He felt natural on stage and started to work a few local clubs. While working at the Distillers company chemical factory in Salt End, east of Hull, Collier started making his workmates laugh with improvised comic routines during breaks (and all too often outside them). Encouraged by his managers, he started to work the wider northern working club scene, becoming a full-time comic in 1962 and enjoying steady success through the 1960s.

He got his initial break at Hull's Perth Street club when a scheduled comedian failed to show, and Collier raised his hand when an audience volunteer was requested. After a positive experience he decided to seek a career in entertainment. He initially began working the local clubs around Hull and further inland in Goole. It was at one of these clubs that he heard the bingo caller using a microphone that kept cutting out; this inspired the broken microphone routine.

In 1970, he won a BBC series called Ace of Clubs, in which club entertainers were pitted against each other, performing their full routines in front of a panel of judges. Collier easily won the final by a unanimous decision of the panel.

He came to national media attention after a successful appearance at the Royal Variety Command Performance in 1971. Though occasionally appearing on television thereafter, he made his main reputation on the northern club circuit, and was highly regarded by many fellow comics (notably Frank Carson, Les Dawson, and Little and Large, who were regular house guests). Jimmy Tarbuck dubbed him 'the comedian's comedian'.

To casual television viewers, he was best known for two routines: one in the guise of a northern club compere whose microphone is working intermittently; another adopting the noises, gestures and movements of a chicken, using his outturned jacket to suggest the fowl's wings. He was the originator of the 'club chairman' character later popularised by Colin Crompton in the ITV series Wheeltappers and Shunters Club. The 'soundbite' demands of television work never reflected the detailed and large-scale routines that have characterised Collier's club work and which brought him enormous success through the 1970s and 1980s. (He was never a participant, for example, in the 1970s ITV series The Comedians.)

== Style ==
Collier's style was very much in the traditional northern-comic school, based on absurdist situational monologues rather than a 'series of jokes', and showed a notable influence of the 1950s star Al Read. Unlike some comedians of the 1970s, Collier's zany set-pieces often drew on northern working-class archetypes.

== Personal life and death ==
Collier lived in Welton, a village west of Hull. He was married to Lucy, and together they had three children, several grandchildren, and a number of great-grandchildren. His autobiography, entitled Just a Job, was published in 2009.

He died on 14 March 2013, aged 87, after a long battle with Parkinson's disease. His funeral service took place on 27 March 2013 at St Helen's Church, Welton, East Riding of Yorkshire and was attended by many fellow comedians including Russ Abbot, Roy Hudd, Tommy Cannon and Bobby Ball.

== Discography ==
Singles
Act	Release	Catalogue	Year	Notes
Norman Collier	"Space Chicken" / "Smile"	Crystal CR 7036	1966	
Norman Collier	"The Singing Chicken" / "I Left My Heart In San Francisco"	Tembo Records TML 133	1988	Produced by Ian Summers
