= Cryer's Crackers =

British television panel show

Cryer's Crackers is a television panel show for Yorkshire Television. It was hosted by Barry Cryer. The show ran for eight shows in 1994 and was recommissioned for two more series, in 1995 and 1996.

Teams of celebrities had to compete to identify news clips that were rescued from 25 years of television archives. Comedians Norman Collier and Duggie Brown were the programme's regular team captains, and guests included Brown's sister Lynne Perrie and television presenter Richard Whiteley. The producer was Richard Everiss, and the compiler and director was Dave Behrens.
