= Ken Goodwin (comedian) =

English comedian, singer and musician

- Goodwin in The Comedians 1972
- Born: William Kenneth Unwin; 7 April 1933; Manchester, Lancashire, England
- Died: 18 February 2012 (aged 78); Rhos-on-Sea, Gwynedd, Wales
- Notable work: The Comedians
- Spouse(s): Pat Earith (m. 1956–1977, her death); Vicki Lane (m. ? - 2012 his death)
- Children: 2 (first marriage)

Comedy career
- Medium: Stand-up comedy

Ken Goodwin (born William Kenneth Unwin; 7 April 1933 – 18 February 2012) was an English comedian, singer and musician best known for his performances on the ITV Television show The Comedians.

== Early life ==
He was born William Kenneth Unwin in Manchester, Lancashire. His father was a stoker. While he was still a child, his mother walked out on the family – an experience he blamed for his insecurity and shyness. His father died from cancer when Unwin was 15.

== Career ==
Goodwin was a great fan of George Formby. He did various jobs and started performing in working men's clubs, telling jokes and playing the ukulele. After he married, his wife persuaded him to enter a talent contest in Leek, Staffordshire, which he won. He worked as an entertainer on the working men's club circuit in the north of England, before television producer Johnnie Hamp saw him performing in Chester and offered him a slot on The Comedians show in 1971. The same year, he won the television talent show Opportunity Knocks.

He was the first regular performer on The Comedians to receive his own solo show on television, as ATV gave him his own TV special, It's Ken Goodwin, in 1972, He featured in the Royal Variety Performances in 1971 and 1972, and appeared in a summer season at the London Palladium in 1972. He was a regular guest on television variety up to 1973, mainly on the ITV channels, with his most memorable slot being on the David Nixon Show in 1973. He also appeared on BBC TVs The Good Old Days.

Goodwin was famous for his giggle and catchphrase, "settle down now" which he used a lot on The Comedians. This phrase, ' Settle Down '/ ' Got to have Tenderness ', was also used for his 1972 single release, on Pye Records, written by Tony Hatch and Jackie Trent, one of a few 1970s releases; others were: ' Keep your Heart '/ ' I'm Alabamy Bound ', '72; ' So Lucky '/ ' Just Like a Woman ', '73; ' Memories '/ ' I Love How you Love Me ', '76. There were three LP releases : ' Settle Down ', '72, on the Granada TV Label; ' Memories ', '76; and, ' Merry Christmas Darling ', '79, on the President Label.

His wife Pat became seriously ill in 1973, and his appearances on television dwindled due to his caring responsibilities. His wife died in 1977, and he started performing again, in cabaret and in nightclubs, but not on television apart from The Comedians Christmas Cracker in 1993. He remained a regular and much sought-after live act, often in pantomimes, especially in Blackpool and Eastbourne, and toured Australia in 1980.

== Marriages ==
Goodwin married his first wife, Pat Earith in 1956; she died in 1977. His second marriage was to singer and dancer Vicki Lane until his death in 2012.

== Death ==
After remarrying, he retired to live in Spain, and then to north Wales in 2008. Goodwin died on 18 February 2012 of Alzheimer's disease in a home in Rhos-on-Sea, North Wales having lived in nearby Llandudno since 2008.
