= Colin Crompton =

English stand-up comedian (1931–1985)

- Born: 22 June 1931; Manchester, Lancashire, England
- Died: 24 August 1985 (aged 54); Manchester, Lancashire, England
- Notable work: The Comedians, The Wheeltappers and Shunters Social Club

Comedy career
- Years active: 1960s–1985
- Medium: Stand-up comedy

George Colin Crompton (22 June 1931 – 24 August 1985) was an English stand-up comedian.

== Biography ==
Crompton, born in Manchester, Lancashire, found fame on the Granada Television programme The Comedians in the early 1970s. His brother Neil, a manager for Barclays Bank, also possessed a comedic streak.

Before his big break into television, Crompton was half of a duo musical comedy act with musician and singer Edward (Eddie) Forrest (piano, ukulele and banjo), doing the rounds of the working men's clubs of Manchester.

In The Stage, dated Thursday 26 June 1958, James Hartley wrote 'Colin Crompton, who for a while has been working for the C.W.S. as a traveller and engaging in lucrative concert work in Lancashire Clubland, is not accepting a Butlin offer of a resident job commencing July 6 at Ayr Camp. "Much as I love the profession, I am not resigning from a well-paid all-the-year-round job for a 10-week season" he told me. Just the same, Colin plans to motor up to Ayr every Saturday to contribute regularly in the Camp's week-end programmes: 400 miles, there and back.'

From 1974 to 1977 he was also the "club chairman" in another Granada programme, The Wheeltappers and Shunters Social Club. An attempt by producer Johnnie Hamp to reproduce the atmosphere of the working men's clubs in a television studio, Crompton was famous for ringing a hand-operated fire alarm bell and telling the audience to "give order" when making announcements from "the committee" in between acts. He wrote his own scripts, with occasional additions by Neil Shand. The MC for the show, Bernard Manning, claimed he was cast in the role because he "had been on The Comedians and he had that gormless look about him so he was ideal".

In 1972 he appeared as himself in the short film A Couple of Beauties.

According to Johnnie Hamp: "Colin was criticised by real club chairmen for the way he acted. One actual club chairman wanted to appear and have it out with him on the show. He came along and met Colin, who was dressed in a very good suit, very smart, and here was this man looking more of a caricature than Colin ever did."

Crompton also had a small role as Roughage in the film Confessions from a Holiday Camp in 1977.

A favourite moment during The Wheeltappers and Shunters Social Club was when he rang his bell to interrupt ventriloquist Ray Alan halfway through his act: "...excuse me Mr. Allen we've had some complaints that they can't quite hear you at the back. Could you hold your dummy a little closer to the microphone please?" This particular joke, like the character of the club chairman itself, owed a heavy debt to the comedian Norman Collier.

Crompton bought and ran a pub called the Birch and Bottle in Whitley, Cheshire.

== Death ==
On 24 August 1985, Crompton died of lung cancer at the age of 54. He was survived by his three children, Cheryl, Erica and John.

== Books ==
- More Best Jewish Jokes, Wolfe Publishing (1970), ISBN 978-0723401650.
- Best West Country jokes, Wolfe Publishing (1970), ISBN 978-0723403906.
- Best nursing jokes (The Wolfe mini ha-ha books), Wolfe Publishing (1970), ISBN 978-0723404200.
- Best motoring jokes (The Wolfe mini ha-ha books), Wolfe (1970), ISBN 978-0723404194.
- Best fishing jokes (The Wolfe mini ha-ha books), Wolfe (1970), ISBN 978-0723404187.
- Best Yorkshire Jokes (Mini-ha-ha Books), Wolfe Pub. (1970), ISBN 978-0723403913.
- Best Seaside Jokes (Mini-ha-ha Books), Mosby-Wolfe (1970), ISBN 978-0723403920.
- Best Newly-wed Jokes, Wolfe (1971), ISBN 978-0723401605.
- Best Office Jokes (Mini-ha-ha Books), Mosby-Wolfe (1973), ISBN 978-0723405184.
- Best After Dinner Jokes, Wolfe Pub. (1973), ISBN 978-0723405191.
