= The Cannon and Ball Show =

British comedy variety television show (1979–1988)

- Genre: Sketch comedy
- Starring: Tommy Cannon; Bobby Ball
- Voices of: Robin Houston
- Theme music composer: Nigel Hess
- Opening theme: "Together We'll Be OK"
- Country of origin: United Kingdom
- Original language: English
- No. of series: 9
- No. of episodes: 64 (inc. 9 specials)

Production
- Running time: 30–60 minutes (inc. adverts)
- Production companies: LWT (1979-88); Yorkshire Television (1988 Christmas Special)

Original release
- Network: ITV
- Release: 28 July 1979 – 24 December 1988

The Cannon and Ball Show is a comedy variety show on ITV featuring the double act comprising Tommy Cannon and Bobby Ball.

The pair were booked to perform on seven episodes of Bruce Forsyth's Big Night, but not all of their segments were screened, as producers were trying to shore up ratings and decided to give Forsyth more air time instead. During this time, LWT's then director of programmes Michael Grade watched the dropped clips and decided to give the pair their own television series.

Cannon & Ball's first regular television series was filmed by LWT and lasted nine years, until December 1988.

After the series ended, the pair went on to Cannon and Ball's Casino, a Saturday-night game show for Yorkshire Television in 1990, and Plaza Patrol, also for Yorkshire Television.

== Transmissions ==
Series	Start date	End date	Episodes
1	28 July 1979	16 November 1979	6
2	11 April 1980	23 May 1980	7
3	25 April 1981	30 May 1981	6
4	8 May 1982	12 June 1982	6
5	3 December 1983	21 January 1984	6
6	13 October 1984	17 November 1984	6
7	26 April 1986	31 May 1986	6
8	10 January 1987	14 February 1987	6
9	28 May 1988	2 July 1988	6

=== Specials ===
Date	Entitle
20 December 1980	Christmas Special
2 January 1982	Cannon & Ball at Drury Lane
11 December 1982	The Best of Cannon & Ball
2 April 1983	Easter Special
7 April 1985	The Best of Cannon & Ball
21 December 1985	Christmas Special
27 December 1986	Christmas Special
2 January 1988	The Cannon & Ball Special
24 December 1988	Christmas Special
