= Juniper Jungle =

- Starring: Maxton G. Beesley; Jonathan Dunne; Sarah Dangerfield
- Country of origin: United Kingdom
- No. of episodes: 13

Production
- Running time: 10 min.

Original release
- Network: BBC
- Release: 25 December 1992 – 26 March 1993

Juniper Jungle is a cartoon series based on the series of books created by the British comedian Bobby Ball, who also previously created another cartoon Military Style! with ITV in 1990. The series was later dubbed with American accents for the international market, where it aired as Juniper Jungle Adventures.

== Plot summary ==
It is set in a thick jungle where toffees grow. Next to the jungle is the peaceful and fun Juniper village where residents such as Toby the Tortoise, Trevor Tiger, Mervin Monkey, Jock the Croc and Bertie Ball the Policeman live. But their happiness is always disturbed by the schemes of the bad-tempered Miserable Mattress and his gang of Nasties from Swampland, so the residents always have to come up with a clever way to foil them.

== Episodes ==
1. Snow Business
2. The Great Bun Robbery
3. The Great Car Race
4. Happy Ever After
5. Surf's Up
6. Nasty Dancing
7. Stink Bomb's Away
8. Daylight Robbery
9. Spring into Action
10. Up in Smoke
11. Fifi Comes to Town
12. Dive, Dive, Dive
13. Still Evil (After All These Years)

The series had a single UK VHS release under the distribution of 'Pickwick Video Group', featuring the episodes 'The Great Bun Robbery', 'The Great Car Race', 'Happy Ever After' and 'Surf's Up'. 'Snow Business', and all the remaining 8 episodes, post-'Surf's Up', were only broadcast and never commercially released.
