= The Music of Lennon & McCartney =

- The opening title used for the special
- Directed by: Philip Casson
- Starring: John Lennon; Paul McCartney; George Harrison; Ringo Starr; Cilla Black; Peter Sellers; Marianne Faithfull
- Country of origin: United Kingdom

Production
- Producer: Johnnie Hamp
- Running time: 44 minutes

Original release
- Network: Independent Television
- Release: 16 December 1965

The Music of Lennon & McCartney is a 1965 British television special honouring the songwriting partnership of John Lennon and Paul McCartney of the English rock band the Beatles. It was produced by Granada Television and aired on that station on 16 December 1965 before receiving a national broadcast across the entire ITV network, of which Granada was a part, the following evening. The programme mainly consisted of other artists miming to their recordings of Lennon–McCartney songs, interspersed with scripted commentary from Lennon and McCartney. In addition, the Beatles performed both sides of their current single, "Day Tripper" and "We Can Work It Out". Peter Sellers performed a comedic interpretation of "A Hard Day's Night", in the style of stage actor Laurence Olivier's portrayal of Richard III.

The special served as further recognition for the Beatles, particularly Lennon and McCartney, outside the usual parameters of pop music. It followed the band members being presented with their MBEs in late October 1965 and led to a surge in the number of cover versions of Lennon–McCartney songs. The special was not shown again until December 1985, when it aired as part of Channel 4's celebration of 30 years of Granada Television.

== Background and filming ==
The Music of Lennon & McCartney was a project initiated by Johnnie Hamp, who had championed the Beatles on Granada Television in 1962, a year before the band achieved national fame. Hamp intended the 1965 special to be a tribute to the Lennon–McCartney songwriting partnership. Negotiations to ensure the Beatles' participation were held for two months. The format was a variety special. Paul McCartney later said that the show "wasn't really our thing", and that he and John Lennon only agreed to participate out of loyalty towards Hamp. While the band committed to the Granada project, they turned down an invitation to perform at the Royal Variety Show and refused to reprise the Beatles Christmas Shows they had held over the 1963–64 and 1964–65 holiday seasons.

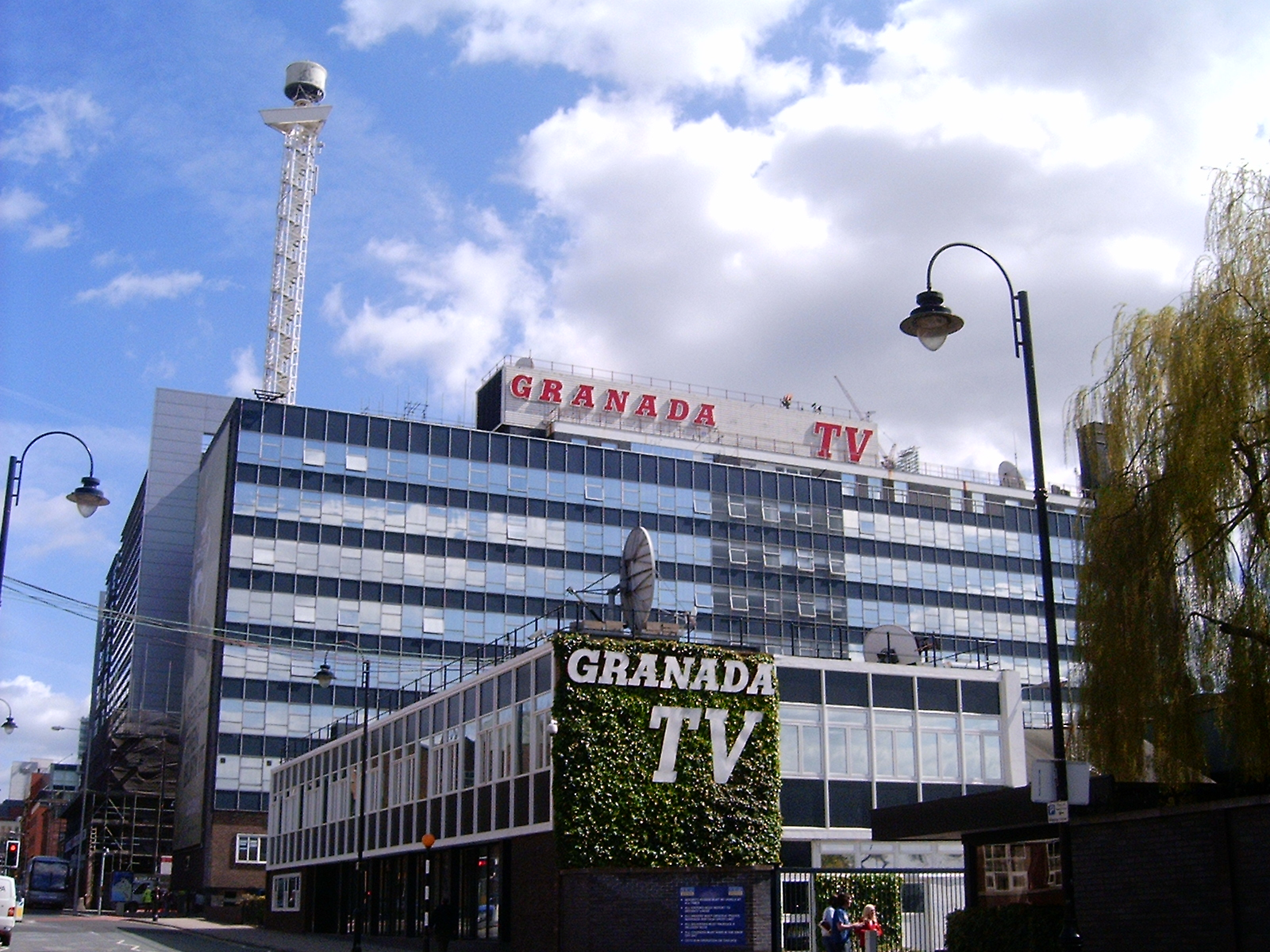
Granada's television centre on Quay Street, Manchester (pictured in 2006)

Filming took place at Granada's studios in Manchester on 1–2 November 1965. The Beatles interrupted the recording sessions for their album Rubber Soul, which they were under pressure to complete for a pre-Christmas release, in order to appear on the programme. Lennon and McCartney's contributions included delivering the scripted links between other artists' performances of their songs. George Harrison and Ringo Starr joined their bandmates to film mimed performances of both sides of the Beatles' forthcoming single, "Day Tripper" and "We Can Work It Out". The set design featured scaffolding around the walls, and steps and ladders. The harmonium played by Lennon during "We Can Work It Out" was the same instrument seen in Granada's popular soap opera Coronation Street. The Pamela Devis Dancers provided the choreography for some of the musical segments.

Peter Sellers filmed his contribution in advance at a studio in London, due to his other film commitments. The Beatles admired R&B singer Esther Phillips and had her flown over from America to give her first performances in the UK.

== Programme content ==
All information per John Winn's book Way Beyond Compare: The Beatles' Recorded Legacy, Volume One, 1962–1965, unless otherwise noted.

Part 1

- The George Martin Orchestra, medley including "I Feel Fine" – ends with a cut to Lennon and McCartney playing a cymbal with drumsticks
- Peter and Gordon, "A World Without Love" – introduced by Lennon and McCartney after the pair have listened to some cover versions of their songs played on set props such as a Victrola, a reel-to-reel tape machine, and a transistor radio
- Lulu, "I Saw Him Standing There"
- Alan Haven and Tony Crombie, "A Hard Day's Night"
- Fritz Spiegl's Barock and Roll Ensemble, a string quartet with a recorder, performing "She Loves You" – introduced by Lennon and McCartney; the ensemble members, wearing Baroque-era costumes and powdered wigs, are surrounded by a crowd of women dressed in contemporary Mod fashions
- The Beatles, "Day Tripper" – accompanied by a group of go-go dancers

Part 2

- Paul McCartney/Marianne Faithfull, "Yesterday" – starts with McCartney miming to the Beatles' 1965 track and cuts abruptly, at the start of the second verse, to Faithfull miming to her recent recording, which she sings in a different key (Note: A friend of McCartney through her artist husband John Dunbar, Faithfull was eight months pregnant and was filmed only from the shoulders up.)
- Antonio Vargas, "She Loves You" – preceded by Lennon and McCartney walking around the set while they discuss foreign-language interpretations of their songs
- Dick Rivers, "Ces Mots Qu'on Oublie un Jour (Things We Said Today)"
- Billy J. Kramer & the Dakotas, "Bad to Me"
- Cilla Black, "It's for You"

Part 3

- The George Martin Orchestra, "Ringo's Theme (This Boy)" – accompanied by a group of dancers
- Henry Mancini, "If I Fell" – introduced by McCartney
- Esther Phillips, "And I Love Him" – introduced by Lennon
- The George Martin Orchestra, "Another Girl"
- Peter Sellers, "A Hard Day's Night"
- The Beatles, "We Can Work It Out"

== Broadcast ==
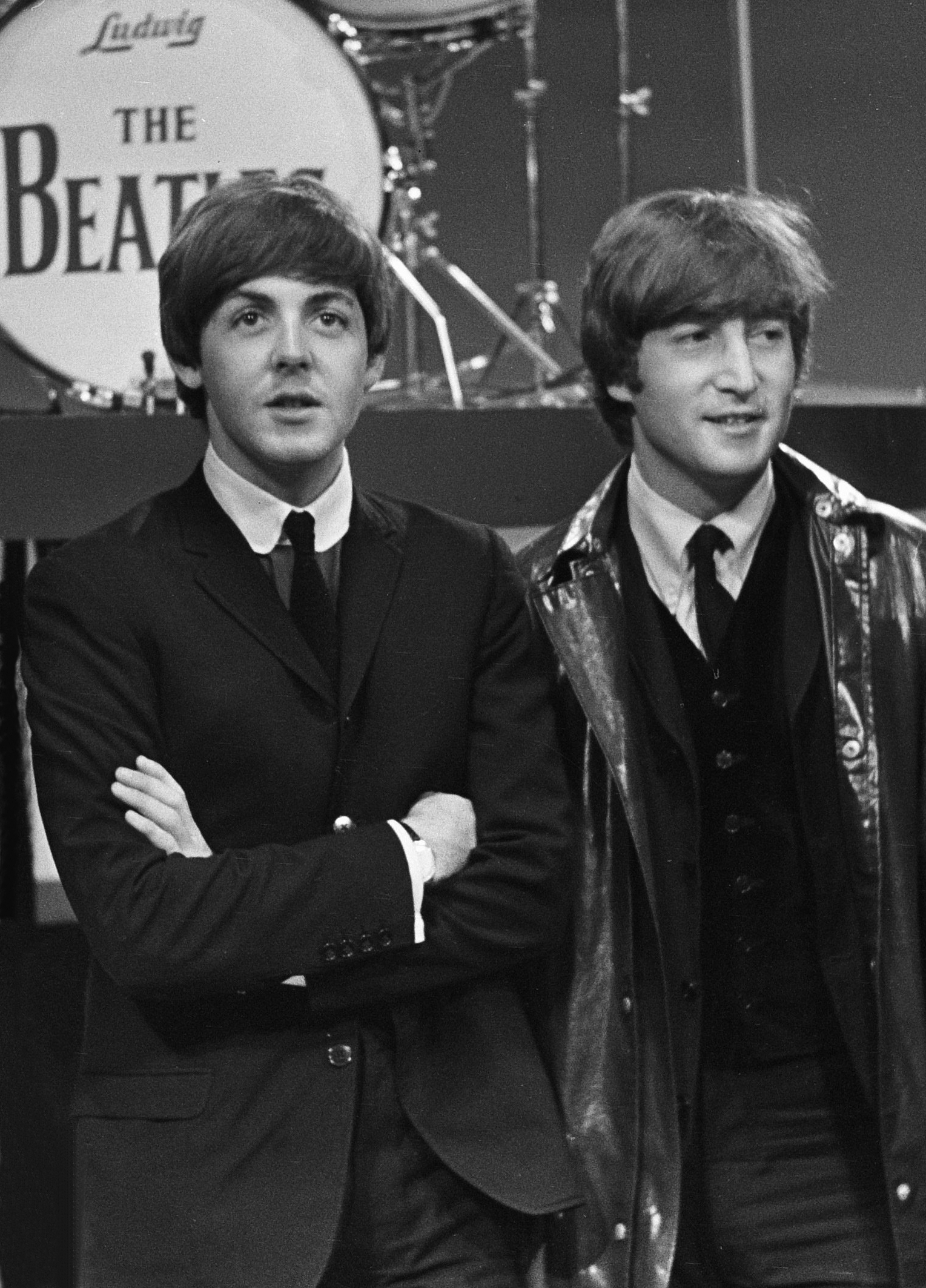
McCartney and Lennon on a Dutch television show in June 1964

Melody Maker announced the TV special, along with the imminent release of "Day Tripper" / "We Can Work It Out" and Rubber Soul, and the dates for the band's 1965 UK tour, on the front page of its 4 December issue. The special aired on the Granada network in the north of England between 9.40 and 10.35 pm on 16 December, and then received a nationwide broadcast on ITV on 17 December. It was the only television appearance the Beatles made in conjunction with the release of their new music, as promotional films for "Day Tripper" and "We Can Work It Out" were used to promote the single on Top of the Pops and other TV shows. The Music of Lennon & McCartney inspired the band's decision to make these clips, which served as forerunners to music videos becoming the standard means of promoting pop singles.

At the time, Lennon said of his and McCartney's songs: "There are only about a hundred people in the world who really understand what our music is all about. Ringo, George, and a few others scattered around the globe ... The reason so many people use our numbers and add nothing at all to them is that they do not understand the music. Consequently they make a mess of it."

The recognition afforded the Lennon–McCartney partnership followed BBC Radio's Songwriters programme on the pair's achievements, while Mike Hennessey, writing in the same issue of Melody Maker, said the Beatles were "a pop music phenomenon which may very well never recur on such a monumental scale", adding: "But unquestionably the biggest single factor in their unprecedented success is the superb songwriting partnership of John Lennon and Paul McCartney." In his book 1965: The Making of Modern Britain, Christopher Bray writes that such was the band's ascendancy that year, the Beatles were "everywhere", as not only leaders of a "new aristocracy" but also recipients of MBEs. The latter was an unprecedented appointment for pop stars at the time and a reflection of British politicians' recognition of the Beatles' influence and mass appeal. Combined with the critical and public acclaim given to Rubber Soul, the show resulted in a surge in cover recordings of works from the Beatles' Northern Songs publishing catalogue. In author Bob Spitz's description: "By mid-1966, an astounding eighty-eight Lennon–McCartney songs had been recorded in over 2,900 versions. Gershwin finally had competition."

== Availability ==
The Music of Lennon & McCartney was not aired again until 30 December 1985. It was shown on Channel 4 as part of an evening of programmes recognising 30 years of Granada Television. Due to this broadcast, the programme began circulating among bootleg collectors for the first time. The "Day Tripper" segment was included in the Beatles 1+ CD and DVD set, released in November 2015.

Among Beatles biographers, John Winn describes the Granada special as a "semisuccessful attempt to spotlight John and Paul's songwriting abilities". He says that the pair's "scripted banter is delivered awkwardly" and "neither are comfortable with the whole idea of the show, let alone the corny manner in which they are participating." (Note: In Winn's description, the clear admiration for Esther Phillips evident in Lennon's introduction marked the sole example of sincerity in the two Beatles' otherwise embarrassed delivery of their dialogue.) Hunter Davies similarly finds Lennon and McCartney's spoken contributions "corny", although he gives the programme a score of seven out of ten with the assessment: "Great tribute show, with two fine Beatles performances as well." Rolling Stone critic Rob Sheffield recognises Sellers' segment as an "offbeat highlight" in which the comedian renders "the lyrics as a Shakesperean monologue ... making them sound even filthier".
