= Terri Rogers =

English ventriloquist and magician (1937–1999)

- Born: 4 May 1937; Ipswich, England
- Died: 30 May 1999 (aged 62); London, England
- Occupations: Ventriloquist, magician
- Partner: Val Andrews

Terri Rogers (4 May 1937 – 30 May 1999) was a transgender English ventriloquist and magician.

Rogers was born in Ipswich and was a somewhat isolated youth but determined to build a career in variety. Rogers developed a technically highly proficient ventriloquism act with her ventriloquist figure Shorty Harris, first appearing as a supporting act in music hall in the 1950s. She underwent gender reassignment surgery on the National Health Service in the early 1960s. This brought her some short-lived notoriety but did not hamper her career. Rogers won acclaim for her appearance in the 1968 review Boys Will be Girls at the Theatre Royal Stratford East and went on to become a highly regarded performer on the UK cabaret circuit. She was the only variety act ever to appear at Ronnie Scott's Jazz Club. From 1974 onwards she was a regular guest on TV on The Wheeltappers and Shunters Social Club. She also appeared on BBC TV's long running Music Hall variety show, The Good Old Days. Her cabaret career eventually extended internationally including appearances at Las Vegas and The Magic Castle in Hollywood, and on United States TV.

Her work as a magician was always something of a sideline but she was an ingenious developer of magic tricks including illusions for David Copperfield and Paul Daniels. She was an expert on "topology", the art of creating illusions with shapes, and wrote three standard texts on the subject. She was particularly known for illusions with Borromean Rings.

Rogers died in London after a series of strokes.

== Publications ==
Rogers published a number of magic effects and books, predominantly through specialist magic publisher Martin Breese. These include:

- The Little Book of Ventriloquism (c.1948)
- Terri Rogers' Star Gate (1985)
- Boromian Link (1986)
- Wipe Out (1986)
- Word of Mind (1986)
- Secrets (1986)
- More Secrets (1988)
- Top Secrets (1998)

In addition to these books, Rogers sold several manufactured tricks, including The Key and BlockBuster.
