= Paul Melba =

English comedian and impressionist (1936–2020)

Paul Melba (born Francis Staunton; 1936 – 11 August 2020) was an English comedian and impressionist, known as a star of the ITV impressions show Who Do You Do? and as one of the first comics to appear on The Comedians.

== Early life ==
He grew up in Huyton, Lancashire (now Merseyside). His father was a comedian under the stage name Sandy Franks. After leaving school, Frank Staunton joined the Royal Marines Reserve, before returning home and deciding on a show business career under the name Paul Melba.

== Career ==
Melba's impressions of the actor James Mason, Charles, Prince of Wales and Prince Philip, Duke of Edinburgh were known throughout the entertainment industry. Other commonly impersonated voices included Eric Morecambe, Ken Dodd, Billy Connolly, Tommy Cooper and Robin Day. Additionally, he would perform singing impressions, with renditions of Frank Sinatra, Dean Martin, Tony Bennett and Sammy Davis Jr.

As well as appearances in clubs and theatres, he made several other television appearances, including Punchlines and eight editions of The Val Doonican Show. He appeared on the Royal Variety Performance in 1974. Melba also worked as an after-dinner speaker and raconteur and was latterly based on the Costa Blanca in Spain.

== Death ==
Melba died from heart failure in August 2020 at the age of 84, at his home in Spain.
