= Shep's Banjo Boys =

Shep's Banjo Boys were a British musical act who appeared weekly on The Comedians, a British television show of the 1970s (later reprised in the mid-1980s and early 1990s), produced by Johnnie Hamp of Granada Television. They were a 7-piece band comprising (for the first five series) Charlie Bentley (tenor banjo), Andy Holdorf (trombone), John Drury (sousaphone), John Orchard (piano), John Rollings (drums), Graham Shepherd (banjo) and Howard Shepherd (lead banjo). In 1973, the line up was Howard "Shep" Shepherd (lead banjo), Graham Shepherd and Mike Dexter (banjos), Tony Pritchard (trombone), Tony "Tosh" Kennedy (sousaphone) and Ged Martin (drums).

During the 1980s, the group regularly entertained Queen Elizabeth 2 passengers playing background reception music and "welcome aboard" acoustic music, in addition to their cabaret spot.

In 2013, they toured the UK with comedian Jimmy Cricket and Neil Hurst in a live show, The Good Old Days of Music Hall and Variety.
