= Graham Walker (actor) =

English comic (1945–2013)

- Graham Walker performing in 1985
- Born: Graham Paul Walker; 17 May 1945; Leeds, West Yorkshire, England
- Died: 2 June 2013 (aged 68); Leeds, West Yorkshire, England
- Notable work: The Grumbleweeds; The Grumbleweeds Radio Show
- Spouse: Susan Walker

Comedy career
- Years active: 1962–2013
- Medium: Television, stage

Graham Paul Walker (17 May 1945 — 2 June 2013) was an English comic, known for being a member of The Grumbleweeds.

== Career ==
Walker joined The Grumbleweeds in 1962 at the request of Maurice Lee, who himself had just been asked to join by Robin Colvill. The Grumbleweeds turned professional in 1967 after appearing on Opportunity Knocks. The group would gain their own radio show, The Grumbleweeds Radio Show, that lasted from 1979 to 1991 on BBC Radio 2, and later a television series.

Walker appeared in Episode 5 of Max and Paddy's Road to Nowhere in 2004, and portrayed Mike Leeman on one episode of Coronation Street in 2011. Walker portrayed former British prime minister Winston Churchill in a mini series from 2003 to 2004. (See more at Filmography)

== Death ==
Walker died of cancer on 2 June 2013, sixteen days after his 68th birthday. His funeral took place on 12 June. At the time, the Grumbleweeds had been reduced to a duo, consisting of Walker and Colvill.

== Filmography ==
=== Radio ===
- The Grumbleweeds Radio Show – various characters – 1979–1991

=== Television ===
- The Grumbleweeds Show – various characters – 1983–1988
- Rock With Laughter – himself – 1993 (one episode)
- New Voices – Gary – 1997 (one episode)
- Heartbeat – Mickey – 1997 (one episode)
- Churchill – Winston Churchill – 2003–2004 (three episodes)
- The Courtroom – Tom Briley – 2004 (one episode)
- Max and Paddy's Road to Nowhere – Old farmer – 2004 (one episode)
- Coronation Street – Mike Leeman – 2011 (one episode)

=== Film ===
- Red Riding: The Year of Our Lord 1974 – Uncle Eric – 2009
- Boy Called Bremner – Jimmy – 2014

== See also ==
- The Grumbleweeds
