= Lee Wilson (comedian) =

English comedian (1938–2013)

- Born: 31 July 1938; Wednesbury, Staffordshire, England
- Died: 3 June 2013 (aged 74)
- Notable work: The Comedians
- Spouse: Sheila Rose Beards

Comedy career
- Medium: Stand-up comedy

Lee Wilson (31 July 1938 – 3 June 2013) was an English comedian best known for his performances on the ITV Television show The Comedians.

He attended King's Hill School, Wednesbury and served in Malaya with the Cheshire Regiment of the British Army where he was in an entertainment troupe. After winning talent contests as a singer and forming a band called The Kingsford Four, he added comedy to his act. He then won New Faces in 1976.

Wilson later performed on cruise ships for P&O and became an after-dinner speaker. He died of pancreatic cancer on 3 June 2013, at the age of 74.
