= Johnnie Hamp =

British television producer

Johnnie Hamp (sometimes referred to as John Hamp or Johnny Hamp) is a British television producer, now retired. He is responsible for the early British television appearances of such acts as the Beatles, Burt Bacharach, Cannon and Ball, Paul Daniels, comedian Woody Allen and singer Lisa Stansfield as Head of Light Entertainment with Granada Television.

== Biography ==
=== Early life and 1960s television ===
As a small boy he toured variety theatres as a stooge to his father, a magician known as the Great Hampo. In 1949 he won several talent contests with his own act, a Danny Kaye Tribute, and then toured with The Brian Michie Discoveries Show. In 1950 he was conscripted for two years service in the Royal Air Force. During the 1950s he trained as a Granada cinema manager in Kingston, moving to the group's flagship venue at Tooting to handle a 1953 Frank Sinatra concert. He presented many more, firstly with Johnnie Ray, Guy Mitchell and Frankie Laine, and later with Tommy Steele, Cliff Richard and Gene Vincent. During this period he arranged personal appearances at Granada Theatres of many Hollywood stars including Jayne Mansfield, Bob Hope, Victor Mature, etc.

In 1961, Hamp joined Granada's television division, retaining his responsibilities for stage show management, and booking acts for television productions such as Chelsea at Nine. Granada boss Sidney Bernstein soon noticed Hamp's potential as a producer, and put him in charge of several television quiz shows including Spot the Tune, Criss Cross Quiz, and Take A Letter.

By the mid-1960s, Hamp was based at the new company headquarters in Manchester, where he was making the regional news magazine programme Scene at 6.30. This was followed by a successful series of television specials featuring blues based American artists. The shows included Sarah Sings and Basie Swings (1963), with Sarah Vaughan and Count Basie; I Hear the Blues (1963), featuring Memphis Slim, Muddy Waters, Sonny Boy Williamson and Willie Dixon; The Blues and Gospel Train (1964), with Sister Rosetta Tharpe; Whole Lotta Shakin' Goin' On (1964), with Jerry Lee Lewis and Gene Vincent; and It's Little Richard (1963). In addition, he championed the Beatles by giving the band television exposure in 1962, at a time when they were little known outside Liverpool.

Hamp made three notable television specials during 1965: Woody Allen, The Bacharach Sound, and The Music of Lennon & McCartney.

In 1969, he took over as producer of the film programme Cinema, fronted by the young Michael Parkinson.

=== The Comedians ===
1971 saw Hamp's peak of success with the series The Comedians (intermittently 1971–1985), which introduced innumerable new faces to the British public and kickstarted a number of solo comedy careers. These included Mike Reid, Charlie Williams, Colin Crompton, Mick Miller, George Roper, Stan Boardman and Bernard Manning. The series featured mainly Northern stand-up comedians drawn from the club circuit. It was a ratings success for Granada. In 1972-73, he produced spectacular stage versions of 'The Comedians' which played weekly at major theatres and for long summer seasons at The London Palladium, Blackpool, Great Yarmouth, and Clacton.

Continuing in the Northern club tradition, The Wheeltappers and Shunters Social Club (1974–1976), a variety series set in a makeshift working men's club, was another success, often featuring many cast members from The Comedians. Other notable programmes and series include The International PopProms (1975), Paul Daniels Blackpool Bonanza (1978), Bernard Manning in Las Vegas (1978) and The Video Entertainers (1981).

=== Retirement ===
Hamp left Granada Television in 1987, to form his own independent production company, Johnnie Hamp Enterprises. He became the subject of This Is Your Life in 1992, when he was surprised by Michael Aspel at Manchester's Victoria & Albert Hotel. In 2008, Hamp published his anecdotal autobiography It Beats Working for a Living. In December 2012, Hamp received 'The City of Manchester and Lord Mayor's Lifetime Achievement Award'. Now retired and still living in Manchester, Hamp concentrates on his love of oil painting, charity work and after-dinner speaking.
