= I'm a Celebrity...Get Me Out of Here! (British TV series) series 5 =

I'm a Celebrity...Get Me Out of Here!
- Series 5
- Presented by: Anthony McPartlin; Declan Donnelly
- No. of days: 18
- No. of castaways: 12
- Winner: Carol Thatcher
- Runner-up: Sheree Murphy
- Companion show: I'm a Celebrity...Get Me Out of Here! NOW!
- No. of episodes: 16

Release
- Original network: ITV
- Original release: 20 November – 5 December 2005

Series chronology
- ← Previous; Series 4 Next → Series 6

The fifth series of I'm a Celebrity...Get Me Out of Here! began on 20 November 2005 and ended on 5 December 2005. The programme ran for 16 days (18 days if counting the day the celebrities arrived and the morning the finalists exited). The series was won by Carol Thatcher.

Ant & Dec presented the main show on ITV, whilst Matt Brown and former contestant Tara Palmer-Tomkinson hosted the spin-off show I'm A Celebrity... Get Me Out of Here... Now! on ITV2. Live streaming returned for the final time and was again broadcast overnight on ITV2, but was no longer repeated during the daytime.

== Contestants ==
12 contestants participated, one more than in the previous series.

Celebrity	Famous for	Status
Carol Thatcher	Journalist & daughter of Margaret Thatcher	Winner on 5 December 2005
Sheree Murphy	Former Emmerdale actress	Runner-up on 5 December 2005
Sid Owen	EastEnders actor	Third place on 5 December 2005
Jimmy Osmond	Singer, actor, & businessman	Eliminated 7th on 4 December 2005
Bobby Ball	Cannon and Ball comedian	Eliminated 6th on 3 December 2005
Antony Costa	Blue singer	Eliminated 5th on 2 December 2005
Jenny Frost	Former Atomic Kitten singer	Eliminated 4th on 1 December 2005
David Dickinson	Former Bargain Hunt presenter	Eliminated 3rd on 29 November 2005
Kimberley Davies	Former Neighbours actress	Withdrew on 28 November 2005
Jilly Goolden	Wine critic & journalist	Eliminated 2nd on 28 November 2005
Tommy Cannon	Cannon and Ball comedian	Eliminated 1st on 27 November 2005
Elaine Lordan	Former EastEnders actress	Withdrew on 20 November 2005

== Results and elimination ==
Indicates that the celebrity received the fewest votes and was immediately eliminated (no bottom two)
Indicates that the celebrity was in the bottom two in the public vote

	Day 10	Day 11	Day 12	Day 13	Day 14	Day 15	Day 16	Day 17	Day 18		Number of trials
	Day 10	Day 11	Day 12	Day 13	Day 14	Day 15	Day 16	Day 17	Round 1	Round 2	Number of trials
Carol	Safe	Safe	Safe	Safe	Safe	Safe	Safe	Safe	Safe	Winner (Day 18)	5
Sheree	Safe	Safe	Bottom two	Safe	Safe	Safe	Bottom two	Bottom two	Safe	Runner-up (Day 18)	4
Sid	Safe	Bottom two	Safe	Safe	Safe	Safe	Safe	Safe	3rd	Eliminated (Day 18)	4
Jimmy	Safe	Safe	Safe	Safe	Safe	Safe	Safe	4th	Eliminated (Day 17)		3
Bobby	Safe	Safe	Safe	Safe	Safe	Bottom two	5th	Eliminated (Day 16)			2
Antony	Safe	Safe	Safe	Safe	Bottom two	6th	Eliminated (Day 15)				2
Jenny	Safe	Safe	Safe	Safe	7th	Eliminated (Day 14)					2
David	Bottom two	Safe	8th	Eliminated (Day 12)							1
Kimberley	Safe	Safe	Withdrew (Day 11)								2
Jilly	Safe	10th	Eliminated (Day 11)								1
Tommy	11th	Eliminated (Day 10)									1
Elaine	Withdrew (Day 1)										0
Bottom two	David; Tommy	Jilly; Sid	David; Sheree	None	Antony; Jenny	Antony; Bobby	Bobby; Sheree	Jimmy; Sheree	No bottom two		
Eliminated	Tommy Fewest votes to save	Jilly Fewest votes to save	David Fewest votes to save	None	Jenny Fewest votes to save	Antony Fewest votes to save	Bobby Fewest votes to save	Jimmy Fewest votes to save	Sid Fewest votes to win	Sheree Fewest votes to win	
Eliminated	Tommy Fewest votes to save	Jilly Fewest votes to save	David Fewest votes to save	None	Jenny Fewest votes to save	Antony Fewest votes to save	Bobby Fewest votes to save	Jimmy Fewest votes to save	Sid Fewest votes to win	Carol Most votes to win	

== Bushtucker Trials ==
The contestants take part in daily trials to earn food. The participants are chosen by the public, up until the first eviction, when the campers decide who will take part in the trial

The public voted for who they wanted to face the trial
The contestants decided who did which trial
The trial was compulsory and neither the public or celebrities decided who took part

Trial number	Air date	Name of trial	Celebrity participation	Winner/Number of stars
1	20 November	Scales of Justice	David; Sid	5/10 stars
2	21 November	Highway to Hell	Carol	3/9 stars
3	22 November	Kangaroo Court	Jimmy	7/9 stars
4	23 November	Ant and Dec Farm	Kimberley	1/9 stars
5	24 November	Blind Man's Bluff	Carol; Jilly	8/9 stars
6 (Live)	25 November	Rocky Horror	Sheree	5/11 stars
7	26 November	Flight of the Bumblebee	Bobby; Tommy	11/11 stars
8	27 November	Scaryoke	Antony	4/11 stars
9	28 November	Dreadful Drop	Kimberley; Sheree	7/10 stars
10	29 November	Panic Station	Jenny	6/8 stars
11	30 November	Jungle Bowling	Antony; Bobby; Sid	7/7 stars
12	1 December	Lily Pad Lottery	Jimmy	6/7 stars
13	2 December	Ant and Dec Farm 2	Sid	6/6 stars
14	3 December	Noah's Ark	Carol	2/5 stars
15	4 December	Satan's Slope	Carol; Jimmy; Sheree; Sid	3/4 stars
16	5 December	Snake Strike	Carol	4/5 stars
17	5 December	Danger Down Under	Sid	4/5 stars
18	5 December	Bushtucker Bonanza	Sheree	4/5 stars

== Star count ==
Celebrity	Number of Stars Earned	Percentage
Antony Costa	11/18 stars	61%
Bobby Ball	18/18 stars	100%
Carol Thatcher	20/32 stars	63%
David Dickinson	5/10 stars	50%
Elaine Lordan	—N/a	—N/a
Jenny Frost	6/8 stars	75%
Jilly Goolden	8/9 stars	89%
Jimmy Osmond	16/20 stars	80%
Kimberley Davies	8/19 stars	42%
Sheree Murphy	19/30 stars	63%
Sid Owen	25/32 stars	78%
Tommy Cannon	11/11 stars	100%

== Ratings ==
All ratings are taken from the UK Programme Ratings website, BARB.

Episode	Air date	Official rating (millions)	ITV weekly rank
1	20 November	9.64	12
2	21 November	10.22	10
3	22 November	7.69	32
4	23 November	8.38	26
5	24 November	9.09	19
6	24 November	8.64	22
7	25 November	8.79	21
8	26 November	8.27	29
9	27 November	9.48	12
10	28 November	10.54	9
11	29 November	9.52	16
12	30 November	9.54	15
13	1 December	9.17	19
14	1 December	8.32	25
15	2 December	9.27	17
16	3 December	9.91	13
17	4 December	10.71	8
18	5 December	12.35	1
Series average	2005	9.42	—N/a
Coming Out	7 December	7.51	17
