= Dukes and Lee =

English comedy double act

- Born: Ronald Charles Duke and Audrey Tomlinson (Ricki Lee): Ronnie Dukes: 1 November 1931, Rotherham, West Riding of Yorkshire, England; Audrey Tomlinson: 22 September 1933, Attercliffe, Sheffield, England
- Died: Ronnie Dukes: 7 June 1981 (aged 49), Jersey, Channel Islands, Audrey Tomlinson (aka Ricki Lee): 30 April 1986 (aged 52), Jersey, Channel Islands,

Comedy career
- Years active: 1960–1986
- Medium: cabaret, television, stand-up, music
- Genres: comedy, musical, cabaret,

Dukes and Lee were a cabaret duo of Ronnie Dukes who was an English musician, dancer and comedian and Ricki Lee (born Audrey Tomlinson) who was an English singer. They originated from Yorkshire and were popular on the cabaret circuit in the 1960s and 1970s.

== Career ==
Ronnie Dukes was born in Rotherham, West Riding of Yorkshire in late 1931. He trained as a dancer in his youth at the Parkgate school in Rotherham, and took part in dance competitions across the north of England as a teenager. After leaving school at 14, he became a professional entertainer with a touring act called Britains Dead End Kids which included the Patton Brothers.

After two years of national service he returned to show business but suffered a severe leg injury which prevented him from dancing for 13 months. During this time he added more comedy to his act and developed his cabaret show in the working men's clubs of the South Yorkshire area.

In 1953, he met Audrey Tomlinson, aka Ricky Lee, who was singing opera songs at the time, he persuaded her to move to more modern songs and they formed an act together and two years later they were married. As the act evolved his piano playing mother-in-law Violet Tomlinson also joined the stage show and became the butt of many of his jokes.

Their appearances on the ITV variety show The Wheeltappers and Shunters Social Club, led to a headlining making spot for Dukes and Lee at the Royal Variety Performance on 10 November 1975 hosted by Bruce Forsyth at the London Palladium.

Their act was self described as an extravaganza and in later years became a family affair with their oldest son playing drums and their younger son playing bass. Their act billing often self described the pair as a king of comedy and queen of song.

Lee was the star of Episode 1 on Series 16 of This Is Your Life.

== Personal life ==
Dukes married Lee (born in Attercliffe, Sheffield, Yorkshire, England as Audrey Tomlinson) at Sheffield Cathedral on 28 April 1955 and remained married to her until his death. They had three children, all of whom appeared on the This Is Your Life feature.

Dukes had briefly quit show business in 1964 with a farewell show at The Willow in Kinsley, even being presented with a silver tray and a cheque for £100. The intent was to take over and run The Center Spot Hotel in Sheffield. He briefly quit performing again in June 1978 after suffering a third heart attack at a performance in Batley Variety Club causing the postponement of the summer season at the Opera House Theatre, Blackpool. However, later that year he felt his health had improved and returned to join the rest of the family in October 1978 at a night-spot in Kenilworth, Warwickshire. Dukes said another reason for his return was the "ridiculous" figure of £300,000 the Inland Revenue has asked him to pay.

The couple's eldest son Dean Dukes is currently a professional drummer playing with Paul Carrack.

== Deaths ==
Dukes died of a heart attack while performing at Behan's West Park in Jersey on the 7 June 1981 aged 49. His wife and sons Dino and Perry were performing with him that evening in the backing group the Trackers. As Lee was finishing a song, he stepped on stage but fell backwards and died a couple of hours later. He had briefly retired three years earlier after suffering from heart issues but financial problems had forced him to go back on tour. He was buried on 16 June 1981, in All Saints Church in Cawthorne, South Yorkshire in a specially constructed vault in the churchyard extension.

Lee carried on as a solo act for a number of years including appearing in an episode of British Comedy series Hi-de-Hi! but died on 30 April 1986, in Jersey at the age of 52.

== Discography ==
- The Dukes and Lee Roadshow (1975) – EMI Records
- Spinning Wheel (1974) – Midland Management
- What Christmas Means to Me (1977) – Damont Records
