= Johnnie Casson =

English comedian (born 1943)

- Born: 29 April 1943 (age 83); Halifax, England
- Occupation: Comedian
- Years active: 1984–present

Johnnie Casson (born 29 April 1943) is an English comedian who has appeared on numerous occasions on British television, notably on ITV's The Comedians and many guest spots on Des O'Connor Tonight.

== Early career ==
Casson was born 29 April 1943 in Halifax, West Riding of Yorkshire. After leaving school ( St Bede's Grammar Bradford), Casson joined a band called The Cresters as their drummer. The Cresters supported The Beatles on their first tour of Scotland, and worked many major cabaret venues, such as Batley Variety Club, Wakefield Theatre Club, Caesars Palace, The Maltings, where they backed Tammy Wynette on several TV specials. With The Cresters he appeared regularly on TV shows such as Cliff Richard & Friends and gaining an army of fans when the band were selected for a long residency on Granada TV.

While on the cabaret circuit Casson not only drummed, but started performing comedy. The comedy gradually became more popular than the music and in 1984, whilst on a family holiday at a Butlins Holiday Camp, his wife entered him into that week's talent contest. He won the contest, which meant a free holiday to appear in the regional finals, which he again won. The grand final was held at the London Palladium and Casson was again the judges choice. Following this, and a winning slot on Bob Says Opportunity Knocks!, he decided it was time to break from The Cresters, and went on the road as a solo stand-up comedian.

== TV highlights ==
1987 ITV Summer Time Special
1992 ITV The New Comedians (Featured in all five shows); ITV Celebrity Squares
1993 BBC1 Rock With Laughter; ITV Comedians Christmas Cracker
1995 ITV Talking Telephone Numbers; GRANADA/LWT Live From The Lillydrome; SKY ONE Stand & Deliver;
1996 BBC 1 Gag-Tag; SKY ONE Stand & Deliver; ITV Des O'Connor Tonight, Talking Telephone Numbers
1998 ITV Des O’Connor Tonight, Bruce Forsyth's 70th Birthday Live from the London Palladium; CHANNEL 5 Jack Docherty Show
1999 ITV Des O’Connor Tonight; CHANNEL 5 Big Stage
2000 ITV Tonight at the London Palladium; BBC 1 Jim Davidson Presents BBCTV Money In The Bank
2001 ITV Des O’Connor Christmas Show
2002 - 2006 ITV Des & Mel (6 appearances)
2007 Channel 4 Countdown (Dictionary Corner)
2009 Channel 4 The Paul O'Grady Show
