= Duggie Brown =

English comedian and actor (1940–2022)

- Duggie Brown on The Comedians in 1973
- Born: Barry Douglas Dudley; 7 August 1940; Rotherham, West Riding of Yorkshire, England
- Died: 16 August 2022 (aged 82)
- Years active: 1969–2022
- Spouses: Margaret Cooper (m. 1961, divorced) Jackie Grimwood (m. 1982)
- Children: 1
- Family: Lynne Perrie (sister)

Duggie Brown (born Barry Douglas Dudley; 7 August 1940 – 16 August 2022) was an English comedian and actor. He was the younger brother of actress and singer Lynne Perrie.

== Career ==
=== Stage ===
During the early 1960s, Brown was a guitarist/vocalist in a four-piece group called the Kool Katz.

Brown was a cabaret artist who also appeared on Granada Television's popular series The Comedians.

In 2012, The Comedians celebrated forty years with the release of a DVD, The Original Comedians LIVE – 40th Anniversary Show, recorded live during a summer gig in 2011 held at the Blackpool Grand theatre. The DVD featured new performances from Brown, along with Stan Boardman, Roy Walker and Mick Miller.

Brown performed his comedy on various other entertainment shows, including The Good Old Days, where he made appearances between 1971 and 1980.

Brown acted on stage in several productions. In 1999, he played "The Fool" in Shakespeare's King Lear for the Northern Broadsides Theatre Company nationwide tour. In 2013, he took the role of Mr. Boo in Little Voice.

=== Television and film work ===
From the early 1970s onwards, Brown had a successful acting career in television and film, one of his early roles being in the 1969 Ken Loach film Kes, based on a novel by Barry Hines, in which he played a milkman; his sister Lynne Perrie also starred as the lead character's mother.

He appeared in Jack Rosenthal's Another Sunday and Sweet F.A. (1972), which was part of Granada Television's Sunday Night Theatre series. He also appeared in the film For the Love of Ada (also 1972), the big screen spin-off of the television series of the same name. He worked alongside his sister (Perrie) again, in Colin Welland's factory drama Leeds United (1974) in the BBC's Play For Today series. Brown appeared in another Play For Today, The Price of Coal, again directed by Ken Loach and based on the book by Barry Hines.

He then starred in Charlie and the Chocolate Factory film as a foreign reporter.

Brown starred in the short-lived Granada Television comedy series Take My Wife (1979) and in the same period also presented the short-lived Saturday morning children's programme The Mersey Pirate. He had a regular role as laboratory technician Phil Strong in the popular detective series The Enigma Files (1980).

From 1980 to 1982, he appeared in the comedy series The Glamour Girls. Brown had a role in the highly acclaimed BBC drama series House of Cards (1990). In 1994, he briefly joined the cast of Channel 4's soap opera Brookside as Ray Piper.

In 1997, he appeared on Coronation Street, playing George Freeman; and again in 2004, this time playing Honor Blackman's husband Bernie. In 2022 he returned to play Ted Spear. In 2004, he appeared in the long-running ITV drama series Fat Friends, and the film Between Two Women.

In 2002, Brown appeared in A is for Acid with Martin Clunes for ITV.

In 2006, Brown appeared as Mr. Cord in episode four of the first series of Hotel Babylon.

Over the years, Brown has played one-off roles in many long-running television serials, including Crown Court, The Cuckoo Waltz, All Creatures Great and Small, The Bill, Minder, Last of the Summer Wine and Peak Practice.

Brown was one of the original co-hosts of the game show 3-2-1, with Ted Rogers and Chris Emmett. From 1994 to 1996, he was a regular team captain on Barry Cryer's news game show Cryer's Crackers.

Brown also starred in an episode of the police drama The Bill. He played a football referee in the episode "Police Powers" from series 6 episode 47 broadcast on 12 June 1990.

== Grand Order of Water Rats ==
Brown was inducted into Grand Order of Water Rats, eventually succeeding to the position of King Rat in 2020.

== Death ==
Brown died on 16 August 2022, shortly after his 82nd birthday.
