= Take My Wife (1979 TV series) =

1979 British TV sitcom

- Genre: Comedy
- Starring: Duggie Brown; Elisabeth Sladen; Victor Spinetti; Toni Palmer
- Country of origin: United Kingdom
- Original language: English
- No. of series: 1
- No. of episodes: 6

Production
- Running time: 30 minutes
- Production company: Granada Television

Original release
- Network: ITV
- Release: 17 January – 7 March 1979

Take My Wife is a British television sitcom produced by Granada Television. It ran for a single series of six episodes in 1979.

The cast included Duggie Brown as Harvey Hall, a northern stand-up comic, and Elisabeth Sladen as Josie, his higher-born wife. The series was written by Anthony Couch, directed by Gordon Flemyng and produced by John G. Temple.

== Cast ==
- Duggie Brown as Harvey Hall
- Elisabeth Sladen as Josie Hall
- Victor Spinetti as Maurie Watkins
- Toni Palmer as Doreen Underhill
- Joan Benham as Mabel Norrington
