= Jackie Hamilton =

British stand-up comedian

- Born: John Kearns; 12 July 1937; Liverpool, Lancashire, England, U.K.
- Died: 12 August 2003 (aged 66); Knowsley, Merseyside, England, U.K.
- Notable work: The Comedians, Merseyside club performances

Comedy career
- Years active: 1963–2003
- Medium: Stand-up comedy

Jackie Hamilton (born John Kearns, 12 July 1937 – 12 August 2003) was a British stand-up comedian, nicknamed the "Pele of Comedy".

His problems with alcohol, idiosyncratic delivery and strong Liverpudlian accent were factors in his missing out on national success, but his slick anticlimactic style of observational comedy was well regarded in his home town of Liverpool, and he gave a graphic commentary on the social history of Merseyside.

== Biography ==
Hamilton was born off Scotland Road, a dockland area in north Liverpool, where he lived with two sisters, Margaret and Susie and a Brother Joey. He married Teresa, and they had four sons and a daughter. He worked casually as a docker and on building sites before becoming an "ale-house comic" who landlords paid in drinks in exchange for a short comedy set.

He appeared on the ITV TV show The Comedians in the 1970s and appeared live on both the BBC and ITV. His unreliability lead to London booking agents avoiding him. Right up until a month before he died after a stroke in 2003, Hamilton was performing on the Merseyside club circuit, headlining the Radio Merseyside Summer Friday in front of more than 900 people.

Hamilton died from a stroke in Knowsley, Merseyside on 12 August 2003, at the age of 66.

== Tributes ==
A plaque to Hamilton was unveiled at Eldonian Village Hall in 2004.

On 10 April 2007 a profile of Jackie Hamilton entitled Standing up for Liverpool was broadcast on BBC Radio 4. Presented by Les Dennis and produced by Tony Staveacre, it explored the life and career of the much-loved joker, using rare tapes of the man himself in interview and performance and the reminiscences of Ricky Tomlinson, Lennie Chesworth and Mickey Finn.
