= Jimmy Jones (comedian) =

English stand-up comedian

- Born: Albert Simmonds; 9 February 1938 (age 88); Southampton, Hampshire, England
- Occupation: Comedian
- Years active: 1962-present

Albert Simmonds (born 9 February 1938), better known by the stage name Jimmy Jones, is a British stand-up comedian, with a reputation for being "outspoken".

== Life ==
Jones was born as Albert Simmonds, on 9 February 1938 in Southampton, England. He grew up in Rainham, Essex, attending a Catholic school, and initially wanting to train as a priest.

Jones's autobiography, Now This is a Very True Story (ISBN 978-1843581963), written with the aid of Garry Bushell, was published in 2010.

== Career ==
Jones first appeared on stage in 1962 at the Dagenham Working Men's Club, on the same bill as Max Bygraves. Granada Television discovered Jones in a Walthamstow pub in 1970, recruiting him for their popular Saturday night show, The Comedians.

Jones' catchphrase 'Kin' ell' was a play on words, derived from footballer George Kinnell.

In 1983, Jones was presented with what is reported to have been the first gold disc for a comedy album, after his Live from the Talk of East Anglia (1981) achieved 100,000 sales. He was the first stand-up comedian to release a video of his live shows, and in the early 1980s had three videos in the UK top ten. In 1994, The Independent reported that Jones was then "alleged to be the highest-paid stand-up comedian in Britain".

Celebrating fifty-six years in show business in 2018, Jones announced new tour dates.
