= The Boys in Blue =

1982 British comedy film by Val Guest

- UK DVD Cover
- Directed by: Val Guest
- Written by: Val Guest
- Produced by: Brian Fox
- Starring: Tommy Cannon; Bobby Ball
- Cinematography: Jack Atcheler
- Edited by: Peter Weatherley
- Music by: Ed Welch
- Production company: M.A.M. (Film Productions)
- Distributed by: Rank Film Distributors
- Release date: 23 March 1983
- Running time: 89 minutes
- Language: English

The Boys in Blue is a 1983 British comedy film directed and written by Val Guest and starring Tommy Cannon, Bobby Ball, Suzanne Danielle and Roy Kinnear. It is loosely based on the 1939 Will Hay film Ask a Policeman, which Guest co–wrote. It was the final feature film that Guest directed.

The film is about two policemen who have failed to make any arrests and are threatened with dismissal; they begin to invent crime to justify their existence.

== Plot ==
An elaborate theft of priceless paintings has taken place in Central London, and the police are at a loss to explain where they have disappeared to. In the seaside village of Little Botham (pronounced bottom), we encounter the local police force consisting of Constable Ball and Sergeant Cannon, who are concerned with breaking up a traffic jam. One of the delayed drivers is an attractive foreign woman, who Ball causes to collide with a parked car belonging to the Chief Constable. It emerges that the woman is part of the gang transporting the paintings.

Ball and Cannon become suspicious of a new arrival in the area, a writer named Hilling, who they suspect may have something to do with the stolen artworks. The bumbling policemen break into his barn at night but find nothing incriminating, then Hilling threatens them with a gun and chases them away. Next they visit a rich local businessman Lloyd to ask for information about Hilling but he knows nothing.

The postman brings a letter telling them that the Chief Constable wants to close down their police station because there is no crime in the area. They remember the valuable paintings at Lloyd's house, and decide to steal one of them with the help of their friend Kim, Lloyd's assistant. They will then be able to solve the crime, justify their existence, and save their police station.

Although Kim refuses to help with their crackpot scheme, Cannon accidentally finds some of the stolen paintings on the beach. However, while he and Ball decide what to do with them, the evidence is removed by a mysterious stranger hidden in their cellar. Kim arrives at the police station, and reports seeing a UFO. Having taken her home, Ball and Cannon see mysterious blue and red flashing lights and think they have found the UFO themselves (although in reality it is a fake ambulance used by the thieves to frighten the locals).

Meanwhile, a coast guard asks for permission to raise a light on the roof of the police station. The reasons for the request are incomprehensible, but lead to some hilarious banter, after which the lamp is raised. Returning to the beach, the police officers find more paintings, a discarded Turkish cigarette, and then stairs leading to a storeroom which turns out to be the cellar of the police station!

Before Ball and Cannon can call the authorities Lloyd arrives, revealing that he is the mastermind behind the crimes and shutting the policemen – handcuffed together due to their own incompetence – in their cell. He cannot transfer the paintings to a boat, as originally planned, so loads them into the fake ambulance and drives off. Our heroes escape from the faulty cell and set off in pursuit. After several changes of vehicle, Ball and Cannon end up chasing Lloyd and the foreign woman (who turns out to be Kim in disguise) in a bus.

Meanwhile customs officers and police, including Hilling who is a DI with the Arts Squad, converge on the Little Botham police station, and find evidence of the crime. They also realise that the lamp on the roof had been used to guide ships to the beach to pick up the paintings, conclude that Ball and Cannon are responsible, and start to search for them.

The hapless Ball and Cannon continue their own pursuit and are diverted onto a race track, where the bus narrowly misses several speeding cars. Eventually, they collide with Lloyd's car and the police, headed by the Chief Constable, arrive. Despite originally believing that Ball and Cannon are to blame, it is quickly revealed that Lloyd is the true culprit and he is arrested. Our heroes, ignored by the Chief Constable and still handcuffed together, begin the long walk home.

== Cast ==
- Tommy Cannon as Sergeant Cannon
- Bobby Ball as Police Constable Ball
- Suzanne Danielle as Kim
- Roy Kinnear as Lloyd
- Eric Sykes as Chief Constable
- Jack Douglas as Chief Superintendent
- Edward Judd as Hilling
- Jon Pertwee as coastguard
- Arthur English as farmer

== Production ==
Val Guest was approached to make a film with the comedy team of Cannon and Ball. Guest went to see them perform live, and thought "they would be a good draw". Guest says the idea to remake Ask a Policeman came from Bobby Ball being a film buff. "We had a lot of fun making it," said Guest. "It was hard work to lead two newcomers. But we made it." In another interview, Guest claimed "I never wanted to make that" film and "my heart wasn't in it."

Filming started October 1982. "We've always wanted to be film stars," said Bobby Ball.

=== Filming locations ===
The film was shot primarily at Elstree Studios in Hertfordshire, England, but many other locations throughout the United Kingdom were used, such as Edlesborough, Eaton Bray, Weymouth, Wool, Lulworth Cove, St Albans, Borehamwood and Bushey Heath.

== Reception ==
According to Guest "it had a certain amount of success, but not enough success to warrant another one."

Time Out wrote: "This is matriarch humour, strayed from the bosom of clubland; only a Lancashire mother can truly appreciate the feature-length witless babble of Cannon and Ball dressed as bobbies. Cannon has the brain cell, Ball has the catchphrase ('Rock on, Tommy'); they both talk about pulling birds and going to the pictures, repeating each other's lines endlessly, thereby requiring only half a script. Which is all they get. ... To complete the picture of the typical British film comedy cashing in on TV success, just look at the cast list, halve the budget you first thought of, and add a gratuitous advert for British Leyland."

The Manchester Evening News criticised the "feeble script... Cannon and Ball have not made an arresting cinema debut."
