= Frank Carson =

Northern Irish comedian and actor (1926–2012)

Frank Carson KSG
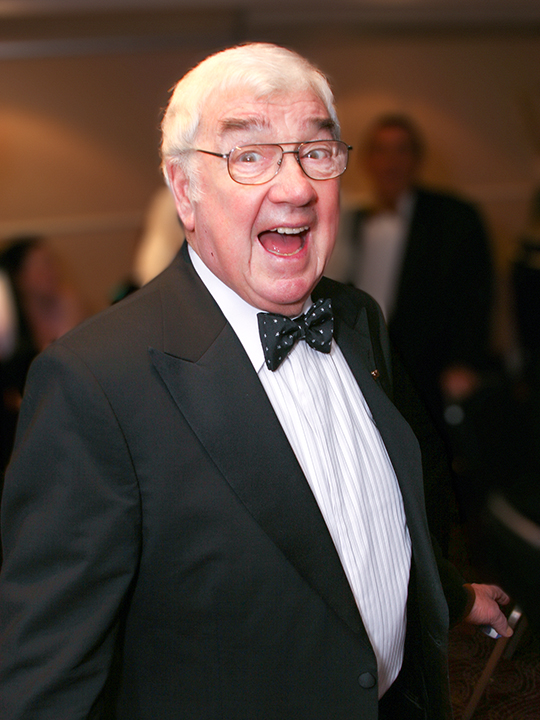
- Carson in 2007
- Born: Hugh Francis Carson; 6 November 1926; Belfast, Northern Ireland
- Died: 22 February 2012 (aged 85); Blackpool, Lancashire, England
- Notable work: The Comedians
- Spouse: Ruth Campbell (m. 1950)

Comedy career
- Medium: Television
- Genre: comedy

Hugh Francis Carson (6 November 1926 – 22 February 2012) was a comedian and actor from Belfast, Northern Ireland. He was best known for being a regular face on British television for many years from the 1970s onwards, appearing in series such as The Comedians and Tiswas. His trademark line was "It's the way I tell them!". Carson was a member of the entertainment charity the Grand Order of Water Rats.

== Early life ==
Carson was one of six children born to a working-class Catholic family from the inner-city Belfast locality known as the Half Bap (now called Cathedral Quarter). He attended St Patrick's Elementary School. The family later moved to 94 Corporation Street in the Little Italy area, close to Sailortown. Carson worked first as a newsboy,, then later as an electrician and a plasterer in the building trade. Carson's family were of Italian descent, with his grandmother hailing from Sicily. In his early days Carson was a choirboy at St Patrick's Catholic church on Donegall Street.

Carson spent three years in the British Army's Parachute Regiment, mainly in the Middle East in the late 1940s. During his service he shot dead an armed terrorist. He himself was shot in the leg and on another occasion narrowly escaped death when a bomb went off outside a cinema. The seven RAF men he was with were all killed. He also assisted with the clear up after the King David Hotel bombing in Jerusalem and made 40 parachute descents.

== Television career ==
Carson became a popular performer on Irish television, before moving to England to work as a stand-up club comedian. He had success on the long-running television music-hall revival show, The Good Old Days. He then went on to win the peak-viewing national favourite talent show Opportunity Knocks, presented by Hughie Green, three times. He was one of the more prominent acts on Granada Television's The Comedians alongside Charlie Williams, Bernard Manning, Mike Reid and Jim Bowen. The series, consisting of 30 minutes of non-stop stand-up comedy from several comedians in each show, became a ratings hit in Britain and helped establish Carson's career.

The Comedians led to similar shows, such as The Wheeltappers and Shunters Social Club, which was an attempt to bring the northern English working man's club show to television. Carson was a regular on television for a number of years after The Comedians, whilst also working as a stage entertainer and appearing before the Royal Family in shows.

In 1975, Carson took the part of Paddy O'Brien, described as "an Irish Republican landlord and coalman", in The Melting Pot, a sitcom written by Spike Milligan and Neil Shand, which was cancelled by the BBC after just one episode had been broadcast.

He was the subject of This Is Your Life in 1985 when he was surprised by Eamonn Andrews at Heathrow Airport after the two had flown over together from Dublin.

When he had heart surgery in 1976 it was suggested this meant he would retire. However, he continued working and became a regular on the ATV children's series Tiswas. He began making acting appearances on television as well as in two cinema films in the 1990s. In 1996, he was a guest on The Ant & Dec Show. In 1998, he was the opening act for Mary Black's musical concert at the English Village in Dubai.

== Later life and death ==
Carson's grave in Milltown Cemetery, Belfast

Carson was still working into later life, making live appearances, in cabaret, pantomime and the summer season throughout the UK. He spent much of his time helping the needy which included raising £130,000 for the Blackpool Victoria Hospital Children's Cancer Ward in 1986.

A theft from Carson's dressing room in Blackpool in 1995 caused ill feeling between entertainers Jim Davidson and Linda Nolan and this was revived in 2014 during an episode of Celebrity Big Brother.

On 2 September 2009, aged 82, Carson returned to the stage appearing at the North Pier Theatre midweek season run of The Comedians in Blackpool, where he lived. On 30 October 2009, he appeared at the Velvet Hall in Paphos, Cyprus.

A routine hernia operation left Carson, who had a heart pacemaker, seriously ill and he underwent a knee replacement operation in July 2009. Subsequent x-rays, 14 days after being discharged from hospital, showed that he had a previously undetected cracked rib, which may have been the cause of the hernia. In August 2011, Carson had an operation to remove a malignant tumour from his stomach.

Carson died at his home in Blackpool on 22 February 2012, at the age of 85. He was survived by his wife, Ruth (née Campbell, 1927–2015), whom he married on 21 January 1950, as well as his daughter, Majella, and his sons, Tony and Aidan, in addition to numerous grandchildren and great-grandchildren. His funeral was held on 3 March 2012 at St Patrick's Church, Donegall Street, Belfast, where he had married his wife Ruth over 60 years earlier. Mourners included Stan Boardman, Dennis Taylor, Eamonn Holmes, Martin McGuinness, Lenny Henry, Dana, Roy Walker and a large crowd of fans. He was buried at Milltown Cemetery.

== Personal life ==
Carson was a Roman Catholic. In 1987 his dedication to charity was recognised by the Catholic Church when he was awarded a papal knighthood of the Order of St. Gregory by Pope John Paul II.

Although he stayed out of Northern Irish politics, he openly supported UKIP in later years.

Carson lived in Layton, Blackpool, where he attended Blackpool F.C. matches at Bloomfield Road. He was a director of Staffordshire football club Chasetown F.C. and in the 1970s and 1980s he was appointed a Director and Vice-President of Newport County football club in South Wales to raise the profile of the club.

In 2009 Carson took part in the television show Cash in the Celebrity Attic to raise money for a local hospice, raising over £900 in the process. Carson lived for many years in Balbriggan in the north of County Dublin, and served two terms as mayor of the town.

On the hundredth anniversary of Carson's birth, 6 November 2026, the Ulster History Circle honoured him with a blue plaque at the primary school where he was educated. His son Tony said: "For the Carson family, this blue plaque brings dad back home, fixing his legacy where Hugh Francis Carson's story began". Comedy actor Dan Gordon paid tribute to his fellow Belfast man: "Frank Carson was quintessentially Belfast".

== Filmography ==
Year	Title	Role	Note(s)
1960s	Opportunity Knocks	Himself	Won three times
1974-77	The Wheeltappers and Shunters Social Club	Himself	Variety television show
1975-76	The Melting Pot	Paddy O'Brien	Seven episodes
1979	Mersey Pirate		Two episodes
1980	Here Comes Channel 8		Television movie
1981	The Ballyskillen Opera House	Frank O'Grady	
1981	Tiswas	Himself	Two episodes
1982	The Kenny Everett Television Show	Various	Two episodes
1986	Roland Rat: The Series	Hans Q. Krakenspiner	One episode
