= The Grumbleweeds =

British comedy rock band

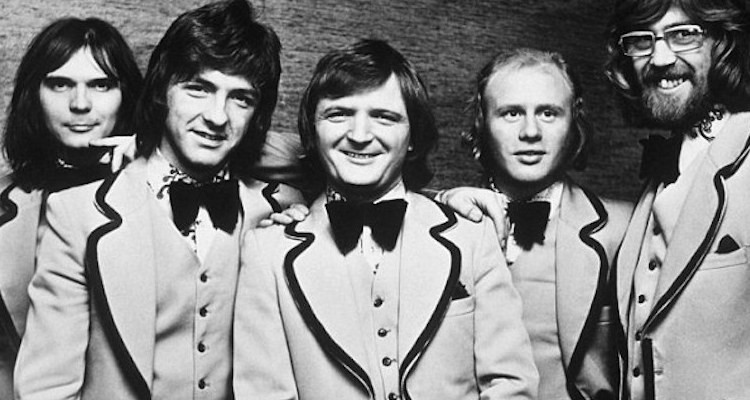
- The Grumbleweeds in 1973. From left to right: Carl Sutcliffe, Robin Colvill, Albert Sutcliffe, Graham Walker, Maurice Lee
- Notable work: The Grumbleweeds Radio Show

Comedy career
- Years active: 1962–present
- Medium: Film, television
- Members: Robin Colvill; James Brandon
- Former members: Graham Walker; Maurice Lee; Carl Sutcliffe; Albert Sutcliffe; Phillip Hall; Tony Jo; Peter Piper

The Grumbleweeds are an award winning British comedy act and band. They were mostly popular on radio and television in the 1980s, including The Grumbleweeds Radio Show which ran from 1979 to 1988 on BBC Radio 2, and a later television incarnation, which ran from 1983 to 1988 on ITV (also known initially as The Grumbleweeds Radio Show, the name of the television series was later changed to simply The Grumbleweeds Show). Still active today, Robin Colvill is the only member who has been with the act from their formation to the present.

== History ==
=== Formation ===
The band formed in 1962 in Leeds by Robin Colvill (born 8 August 1944 in Leeds). Colvill was a jukebox mender who was asked to fix a broken jukebox at a coffee bar. As he was fixing the machine, he saw Maurice Lee (born 12 May 1946 in Leeds) who was playing the guitar on the other side of the bar, keeping the customers entertained whilst there was no music. Colvill approached Lee and asked him to join his group; when Lee asked who else was in the band Colvill replied “So far, just you”. Lee accepted with the condition that his friend Graham Walker (born 17 May 1945 in Leeds) could join as well; after Colvill asked Lee what instruments Walker could play, Lee said that he would teach him bass guitar. Needing a lead guitarist, they added Carl Sutcliffe (born 1944 in Leeds) whose brother, Albert (born 22 December 1940 in Leeds), was also recruited, due to him being an “Opera trained” singer who owned a microphone. The group practised at Stainbeck Youth Club, Meanwood. They played at the "Battle of the Bands" (organised by a Leeds-based newspaper) at the Queens Hall, Leeds (an all nighter) on the same night on 28 June 1963 that the Beatles played this venue as second on the bill to Acker Bilk and his Jazzmen. Over time, the group began introducing comedy routines into their act, initially as a way to cover time between songs should their instruments need retuning. 1967 saw the addition of sixth member Phillip Hall, though he left the group after a few months.

=== Success ===
They turned professional following success on the television talent show Opportunity Knocks in 1967. In the late 1960s and early 1970s the band released several records, none of which made the UK charts. Their fortunes improved when they were commissioned to star in a BBC children's television series, The Coal Hole Club, in 1974. Continuing to perform to packed venues around the UK, BBC radio producer Mike Craig spotted them at the Batley Variety Club and went on to produce several series of The Grumbleweeds Radio Show for Radio 2 throughout the 1980s. The group once had a fan club that included American singer Roy Orbison.

Albert and Carl Sutcliffe left the group in 1988. The remaining members continued as a trio until 1997, when Maurice Lee also left the group. Lee was replaced by Blackpool comedian Tony Jo for five years, before Colvill and Walker chose to continue as a duo. After Graham Walker’s death on 2 June 2013, Robin Colvill fulfilled remaining Grumbleweeds commitments with comedian Peter Piper, after which it was intended for the group to end. However, after working on a stage production called 39 Steps with actor and comedian James Brandon, Colvill’s manager suggested that instead of finding a new replacement for Walker, Colvill should instead assume Walker’s comic role and add Brandon into the act as straight man.

With the addition of Brandon, The Grumbleweeds redeveloped the act, with Colvill assuming the role of the rough-and-ready comic sidekick to Brandon's smooth straight man.

Tony Jo died from an 18 month battle with cancer on 23 January 2022, at the age of 70. Albert Sutcliffe died in September 2023.

== Album discography ==
- In a Teknikolor Dreem (1971)
- Al Bum (1976)
- Comedy From their Radio 2 Series (1979)
- Worravagorrinmepocket (1981)
- Let the Good Times Roll (1986)

The Grumbleweeds recorded the song 'String of Beads' to celebrate Leeds United's 1972 FA Cup Final.

== Personnel ==
Current members

- Robin Stewart Colvill (1962–present) (born 8 August 1944, Leeds)
- James Brandon (2014–present)

Former members

- Graham Paul Walker (1962–2013) (born 17 May 1945, Leeds; died 2 June 2013)
- Maurice Lee (1962–1997) (born 12 May 1946, Leeds)
- Carl Sutcliffe (1962–1988) (born 1944, Leeds)
- Albert Sutcliffe (1962–1988) (born 22 December 1940, Leeds; died September 2023)
- Phillip Hall (1967)
- Tony Jo (1997–2002) (died 23 January 2022)
- Peter Piper (2013–2014)
