= Plaza Patrol =

- Genre: Sitcom
- Written by: Richard L. Lewis; Louis Robinson
- Directed by: Graham Wetherell
- Starring: Bobby Ball; Tommy Cannon
- Country of origin: United Kingdom
- Original language: English
- No. of series: 1
- No. of episodes: 6

Production
- Running time: 30 minutes
- Production company: Yorkshire Television

Original release
- Network: ITV
- Release: 15 July – 19 August 1991

Plaza Patrol is a short-lived 1991 British television sitcom on ITV, featuring Cannon and Ball. Cannon and Ball played incompetent security guards of a shopping centre. This was their final prime time TV series. The series was filmed at the now demolished Seacroft Civic centre in Leeds.

== Episode list ==
No.	Title	Directed by	Original release date
1	"Close Encounter"	Graham Wetherell	15 July 1991
2	"The End"	Graham Wetherell	22 July 1991
3	"The Tramp Who Never Was"	Graham Wetherell	29 July 1991
4	"Sweet Charity"	Graham Wetherell	5 August 1991
5	"Lilac Time"	Graham Wetherell	12 August 1991
6	"The Other Man's Grass"	Graham Wetherell	19 August 1991
