= Bobby Ball =

British comedian (1944–2020)

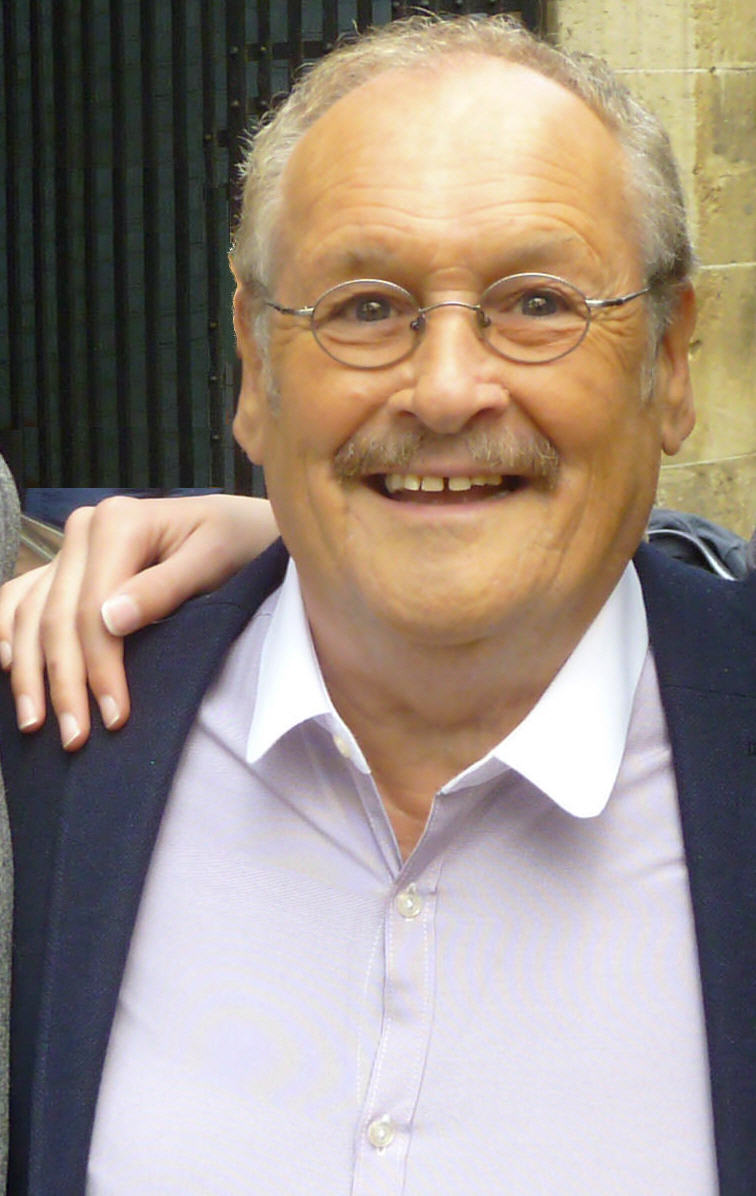
- Ball in August 2013
- Born: Robert Harper; 28 January 1944; Oldham, Lancashire, England
- Died: 28 October 2020 (aged 76); Blackpool, Lancashire, England
- Occupations: Comedian, actor, singer, television host
- Years active: 1972–2020
- Spouses: Joan Lynn (m. 1964; div. 1970); Yvonne Nugent (m. 1974)
- Children: 3

Robert Harper (28 January 1944 – 28 October 2020), known professionally as Bobby Ball, was a British comic, actor, singer and television host. He was best known as a member of the comic double act Cannon and Ball, with Tommy Cannon (Thomas Derbyshire).

They hosted their own ITV show, The Cannon and Ball Show, for nine years between 1979 and 1988. Ball then went on to have acting roles in various sitcoms and dramas including Last of the Summer Wine, Heartbeat and Not Going Out. In 2005, Ball took part in I'm a Celebrity...Get Me Out of Here!.

== Early life ==
Ball was born at Boundary Park General Hospital in Oldham, Lancashire, on 28 January 1944, to May (née Savage) and Bob Harper. He attended Crompton House C of E school, Shaw, Oldham, and briefly studied Shipping Management at Wigan Mining & Technical College before going to work in a factory as a welder, where he also met his future partner in comedy, Thomas Derbyshire (Tommy Cannon).

== Career ==
=== Cannon and Ball ===
Ball was one half of comedy duo Cannon and Ball, opposite his friend and colleague Tommy Cannon. The duo's primetime Saturday night television series The Cannon and Ball Show, was one of LWT's most successful series, with consistently high viewing ratings that lasted for nine years. They starred in the film The Boys in Blue together in 1982 and guest starred in the Eric Sykes slapstick film, Mr H Is Late, in 1988. Other notable guest appearances were The Kenny Everett Television Show in 1982 and Shooting Stars in 1996.

Cannon and Ball competed in the fifth series of I'm a Celebrity...Get Me Out of Here!, and in 2011, Cannon and Ball were guest judges on one episode of ITV's Show Me the Funny.

=== Television ===
Ball was the creator of the ITV children's cartoon series Military Style!, which aired in 1990, and the BBC children's cartoon series Juniper Jungle, which aired in 1992. He played Mr. Turner (also known as Topsy Turner) in the ITV drama series Heartbeat from 2005 to 2006. Between 2005 and 2008, he played Lenny in three episodes of the BBC series Last of the Summer Wine. In 2009, Ball starred in the comedy The Fattest Man in Britain playing Morris Morrissey.

In 2009, Ball was cast as Frank in the long-running BBC One sitcom Not Going Out. Ball made his final appearance as Frank in the eleventh season, which began airing in January 2021, and was filmed a few weeks before his death.

From 2011 to 2017, Ball played Barry in the Sky1 sitcom series Mount Pleasant. The following year, he took part in BBC One's Pointless Celebrities alongside Cannon. His second appearance on the show was for a Children in Need special in November 2013 with Lee Mack.

In 2013, Ball played the role of Duckers in the ITV sitcom pilot The Security Men, starring alongside the likes of Brendan O'Carroll and Paddy McGuinness. The episode, written by Caroline Aherne and Jeff Pope, was later not picked up for a full series. Cannon and Ball appeared in ITV's Last Laugh in Vegas in 2018. Cannon and Ball have also previously starred in the Safestyle UK television advertisements.

In November 2019, he played the regular character Ray, stepdad to Joe Wilkinson's character Simon, in The Cockfields.

== Personal life ==
Ball married his first wife, Joan Lynn, in 1964, with whom he had two sons.

Ball and Lynn separated in 1970.

Ball married his second wife, Yvonne Nugent, in 1974. In an interview on BBC Tees on 28 June 2016, Ball said that he met Yvonne while performing with Cannon at a club in Norton, County Durham: "We were playing there ... she came downstairs in a little mini skirt, looked at me and Tommy, shook her head and walked away. I thought, 'I'd spend my life with her.'"

Ball and his wife lived in Lytham St Annes, Lancashire. Together they had a daughter Joanne born in 1972.

By 1983, Ball's friendship with Cannon had deteriorated and the pair did not speak to each other outside of rehearsals and performances. In 1986, while working at the Bradford Alhambra, Ball began talking with chaplain Max Wigley. Ball said: "I got talking to him and attacked him verbally about God. But he had a peace about him. I can't explain exactly what he had but he had something that I didn't have. One day I asked to speak to him and after a while he said, 'Let's pray.' I'd never prayed in my life but we prayed and it just changed my life – like that [he snaps his fingers]." Shortly afterward Ball became a Christian, which helped re-kindle his broken friendship with Cannon. Cannon became a Christian in 1992, with the pair publishing a book called Christianity for Beginners. They regularly featured in their own gospel and "An audience with..." show in churches around the country. He also taught vicars and clergy how to incorporate humour into sermons.

He published an autobiography, entitled My Life, in 1993.

He was a supporter of the Variety Children's Charity, presiding over the organization's ceremonies and appearing in fundraising events. He received a lifetime achievement honor from Variety, in 2018.

== Death ==
Ball died from COVID-19 at the Victoria Hospital in Blackpool on 28 October 2020, aged 76. A small tribute was paid to Ball after the closing credits of the 2021 New Year's special of Not Going Out, which was the first episode broadcast after his death, before another tribute (a compilation of past scenes featuring his character) that was shown in the final episode of Series 11, which was the final episode recorded before his death.

== Filmography ==
Film

Year	Show	Role
1982	The Boys in Blue	PC Bobby Ball
1988	Mr H Is Late	Driver's mate

Television

Year	Show	Role
1972	Opportunity Knocks	Himself (co-star)
1974	Win, Place or Steal	Professor
1978	Bruce Forsyth's Big Night	Himself (co-star)
1979–1988	The Cannon and Ball Show	Himself (co-star)
1980	Summer Royal	Himself
1982	The Kenny Everett Show	Himself (guest)
1982	The Children's Royal Variety Performance	Cast member
1983	The Boys in Blue	Police Constable Bobby Ball
1986	Tommy Cooper	
1987	Prisoners in Park Lane	
1987	Anything but the Truth	
1987	Slightly Overweight	
1987	Splash	
1988	A Night of Comic Relief	
1988	Mr. H. is Late	
1990	Day out with Dana	
1990	Casino	Host (3 episodes)
1991	Plaza Patrol	Trevor Purvis (6 episodes)
1993	Gloria!	
1996	Shooting Stars	Himself (guest)
1997	Surprise, Surprise	
1997	Babies	Sam Clarington
2002	Rex the Runt	Wayne the Zebra (voice)
2004	Revolver	Various characters
2004	The Royal	John Wilson
2005	I'm a Celebrity...Get Me Out of Here!	Himself (contestant)
2005–2008	Last of the Summer Wine	Lenny (3 episodes: "The Swan Man of Ilkley", "Who's That Talking to Lenny?" and "Get Out of That, Then", in each of which Tommy Cannon also appeared)
2005–2006	Heartbeat	Mr. Turner/Topsy Turner
2006	It's Behind You...	
2007	The Afternoon Play	Bingo Manager
2009	The Fattest Man in Britain	Morris
2009–2021	Not Going Out	Frank (Lee's Dad)
2010	All Star Mr & Mrs	Himself (contestant)
2011	Show Me the Funny	Himself (guest judge)
2011–2017	Mount Pleasant	Barry
2012	Blackpool: Big Night Out	
2012	Coach Trip	Himself (guest)
2012	Casualty	Gerry Davies
2012	Strictly Come Dancing: Christmas Special	Himself (contestant)
2013	Success and Television	
2013	The Security Men	Duckers
2018	Last Laugh in Vegas	Himself
2018	Benidorm	Ron Pickford
2019	The Cockfields	Ray
