= Safestyle =

British window and door retailer

- Industry: Glass, glazing and fenestration
- Founded: 1992
- Products: Replacement windows and doors
- Website: www.safestyle-windows.co.uk

Safestyle is a provider of PVCu double glazed windows, doors, French doors, patio sliding doors, bifolding doors and conservatories in the United Kingdom.

== History ==
Established on 22 December 1992 with £2,000, in 2005 the company installed more than £100 million of replacement windows and doors. Safestyle's head office is in Bradford, West Yorkshire and the company now has more than 40 branches across the United Kingdom.

In 1996 the company expanded and set up a new division, Windowstyle, which manufactures Safestyle's double glazed PVCu windows and doors in Barnsley, South Yorkshire. The company has invested more than £6.5 million in Windowstyle to date, including £2.5 million worth of state-of-the-art glass toughening and processing machinery. The facility is set in an 18-acre (73,000 m^{2}) site, employs over 600 specialist production staff, runs 24 hours a day, 6 days a week, and produces more than 5,500 frames and 13,500 double glazed sealed units per week. It is also the biggest employer in the area.

In 2005 the company was nominated in the national G Awards, which take place annually and are open to all organisations in the glass, glazing and fenestration industries. Safestyle won the G05 Award for Best Promotional Campaign of the Year, following that in 2006 with the G06 Award for Best Customer Care.

Also in 2006, Safestyle UK received Government-backed endorsement in the TrustMark scheme, a scheme also supported by the building industry and consumer groups. TrustMark-endorsed companies must have proven ability to make improvements and repairs inside and outside homes, adhering to high standards of workmanship and customer care.

In 2007, they have continued to win industry awards, winning the G07 Installer of the Year Award, and the G07 Health and Safety Initiative Award at the annual industry G Awards.

In 2013, it was announced that Safestyle UK Ltd would be floated on the Alternative Investment Market in a deal worth £70 million. The company began life in 1992 with £2,000 of seed capital and was floated at £1 a share, at which point co-founder Mitu Misra exited and used some of that money to write and produce his debut film, Lies We Tell, a northern noir set in Bradford and starring Gabriel Byrne and Harvey Keitel.

In October 2023 Safestyle confirmed that they were exploring alternative ways of operating the business either through a sale of the company or capital injection. On 27 October Safestyle announced their intention to appoint administrators and their shares were suspended from AIM the same day. Following the appointment of administrators, Anglian Home Improvements completed the acquisition of the Safestyle UK brand, customer order book, intellectual property and certain other assets.

== Controversies ==
In 2003 the Sunday Mirror published a report on Safestyle UK's sales representatives' techniques, saying that "it is almost a badge of honour to rip off a customer".

In March 2007 the Advertising Standards Authority upheld a complaint against a Safestyle advertisement which had been broadcast in September 2006. They agreed that the advertisement had been misleading in two respects, both relating to the "Buy now, pay next year" credit terms. The ASA ruled that the advertisement should not be shown again.

In 2008 the company was criticized by consumer rights charity Which? for its use of questionable sales techniques.

In February 2011, Safestyle UK became the first company to be prosecuted under the Consumer Protection from Unfair Trading Regulations 2008. In an action brought by North Lincolnshire Council Trading Standards Department they were found guilty under paragraph 25 (ignoring a request not to return) and fined £4,000 with £18,000 costs for repeatedly calling on a consumer in Scunthorpe.

In 2018 Safestyle was fined £120,000 for "aggressive sales" by Sheffield Crown Court. Sheffield Crown Court was told that Safestyle UK employees used a variety of "unlawful business practices" to apply pressure to homeowners

In October 2023, Safestyle UK entered administration, leaving many customers in a difficult situation regarding the certification and warranty of their window installations. A customer from Leeds reported that their £6,000 installation, completed the day before administration, was not registered with Fensa or the warranty provider Installsure, resulting in an inability to address a damp issue caused by improper fitting. Since Safestyle was no longer a Fensa member, certification had to be obtained from the local council at an additional cost of nearly £700. While Anglian Home Improvements took over unfinished orders, customers whose installations were not registered before Safestyle ceased trading were left in a costly limbo, with potential recourse under Section 75 of the Consumer Credit Act for those who financed through Safestyle.

=== Jeff Brown ===
Jeff Brown is known for starring in Safestyle's window adverts from 1999 to 2006 and is also often the match announcer for Burnley FC. In 2013, Premier Range (the club's sponsor) challenged Brown by offering to sponsor him £10,000 to complete the new Jane Tomlinson Pennine Lancashire 10K. After the event, organisations in and around Burnley with charitable status were invited to make bids for a share of the cash pot to support one of their projects after the appeal decided to distribute the money to good causes.

In 2016, Brown pleaded guilty to six counts of tax evasion and was given a 20-month prison sentence suspended for two years. Timothy Brennand, defending, said Brown has 'now got his finances in order' by employing an accountant and a book keeper.
