= Bernard Manning =

English comedian (1930–2007)

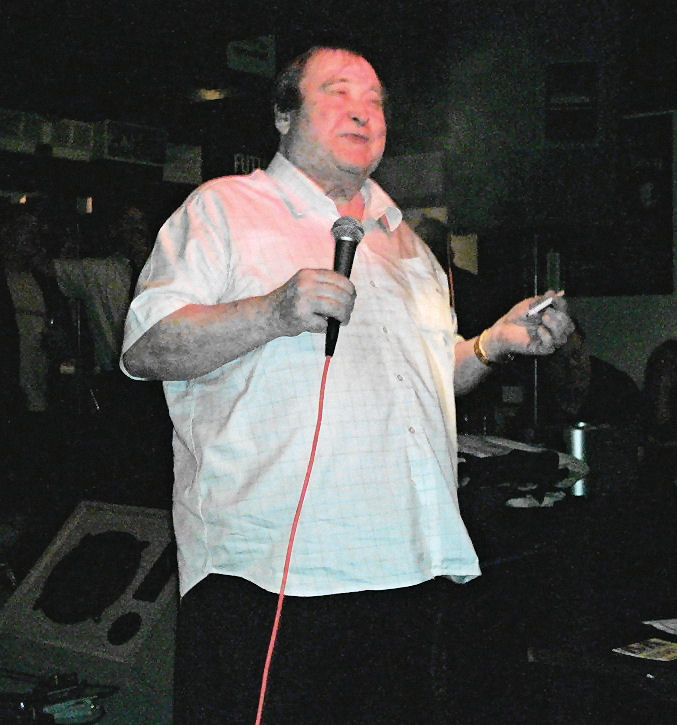
- Manning in 2005
- Born: Bernard John Manning; 13 August 1930; Ancoats, Manchester, England
- Died: 18 June 2007 (aged 76); Middleton, Manchester, England
- Notable work: The Wheeltappers and Shunters Social Club, The Comedians, The Embassy Club
- Spouse: Veronica Finneran (died 1986)
- Children: 1

Comedy career
- Years active: 1950s–2007
- Medium: Stand-up
- Genres: Blue comedy, insult comedy
- Subjects: Ethnicity, women, stereotypes, minority groups

Bernard John Manning (13 August 1930 – 18 June 2007) was an English comedian and nightclub owner. He gained a high profile on British television during the 1970s, appearing on shows such as The Comedians and The Wheeltappers and Shunters Social Club. His act became controversial as attitudes changed, with the result that Manning was rarely seen on television in the last few decades of his career. However, he continued to perform at live venues until his death.

== Early life ==
Manning was born in Harpurhey, Lancashire, and raised in Ancoats, both poor districts of Manchester. The second of three brothers and two sisters, he had Russian Jewish ancestry on his father's side, as well as roots in Ireland, and was brought up a "strict Catholic". In an interview with The Daily Telegraph's Allison Pearson, he stated that his paternal grandfather came from Sebastopol and changed the family name from Blomberg.

He left school aged 14, worked in a tobacco factory and joined his father's greengrocery business, before joining the British Army to do his National Service.

Manning had little thought of entertainment as a career, until posted to Germany, where, according to his self-written obituary (in which he claimed to have guarded Nazi war criminals Rudolf Hess and Albert Speer in Spandau Prison, Berlin, just after the Second World War), he began to sing popular songs to entertain his fellow soldiers and pass the time. This ability led him to put on free shows at the weekends. When he began to charge admission and audiences did not decrease, he realised there was a possibility of making money from showbusiness.

== Career ==
On returning to England, Manning continued to sing professionally, and also worked as a compère. He was an effective singer of popular ballads and fronted big bands in the 1950s, such as the Oscar Rabin Band, which included appearances at the Ritz Hotel. Over the years he began to introduce humour into his compering. This went down well, and Manning slowly moved from being a singer and compère to a comedian. In 1959, Manning borrowed £30,000 from his father and bought a dilapidated billiard hall on the A664 Rochdale Road, and turned it into the Embassy Club. Rather quickly Manning's income substantially increased. The club played host to many other acts, and Manning claimed that the Beatles performed there early in their career.

After much work in comedy clubs and northern working men's clubs in the 1950s and 1960s, he made his television debut in 1971 on the Granada comedy show The Comedians. He compèred The Wheeltappers and Shunters Social Club, which began in 1974. In this period, Manning's material was often accepted as being "harmless banter".

In 1972 he appeared as himself in the short film A Couple of Beauties.

He hosted the 1980 documentary short The Great British Striptease, filmed in Blackpool, and had a starring role in a comedy quiz show Under Manning, produced by Southern Television in 1981. The series was poorly received and short-lived, and by the 1980s Manning had fallen out of favour with television companies, either because of changing tastes or his failure to compromise with television companies. However his appearances on the northern Working Men's Club circuit continued, playing to packed audiences which he said sometimes included people from ethnic minorities.

In 1994, two black waitresses at a charity dinner at a hotel in Derbyshire took exception to Manning's act and appealed to an industrial tribunal against the management of the hotel for racial discrimination, claiming that the word "wog" had been used. Manning said in response that "wog" was "a horrible, insulting word I've never used in my life" but defended use of the words "nigger" and "coon" as historical terms with legitimate roots. The complainants initially lost, but the decision was overturned on appeal and they were awarded an undisclosed sum. On an appearance on The Mrs. Merton Show on 19 March 1998, Manning admitted that he was a racist, which surprised host Caroline Aherne and went down badly with the audience.

Manning never toned down his act, but he had a minor television career revival towards the end of his life, including Channel 4 taking him to Mumbai to perform. In October 2002, he participated in a Great Lives programme for Radio 4. He chose to honour the Roman Catholic nun Mother Teresa. In 2003, Manning was initially reported to have been booked to play a BNP rally. He denied this, telling the Daily Mirror: "It's a lot of bollocks. I don't know where I'm working. Speak to my agent. I don't know about any BNP nonsense. I would not do it anyway. Do you think I'm fucking barmy?" In 2006, he appeared at the 45th birthday party of chef Marco Pierre White.

From 1999 his son, Bernard Manning Jr, managed the Embassy Club, shortly after his father had a mini stroke and became deaf in one ear. He considered his father's act inappropriate for bookings and sought to turn the club into an alternative comedy venue.

== Comedic style ==
Race, sex, and religion were the core material for many of Manning's jokes. Manning's family and friends said that his controversial ways were all an act. He lived next door to an Indian physician's family, who have appeared in many newspaper articles over the years to defend Manning. Satya Rudravajhala, the widow of Visveswara Rao Rudravajhala, wrote a eulogy that was published in the local paper, the Middleton Guardian, conveying the family's sentiments.

In interviews with journalists, Manning would remind them of his appearance with Dean Martin in Las Vegas and meeting the Queen. He said he was a great believer in family values who never swore in front of his mother, stating: "I dragged myself up by my bootlaces. I don't drink or smoke, I don't take drugs. I have never been a womaniser. I was brought up right with good parents and I have never been in trouble or harmed no-one. And I love my family."

By the early 1980s Manning's style of comedy was being seen as increasingly out-dated and politically incorrect. Later detractors criticised his style of humour, with journalist and television presenter Esther Rantzen commenting in 1992 that, "for me, he's always been the villain of comedy".

== Personal life ==
Manning was married to Vera, who died of a heart attack in 1986.

Manning named his house in Alkrington "Shalom", the Hebrew word for "peace".

Manning was a lifelong Manchester City supporter. He was the subject of This Is Your Life on 27 November 1991. For many of his later years, he was a teetotaller and a diabetic.

Having been admitted two weeks earlier for a kidney complaint, Manning died in North Manchester General Hospital at 3:10 pm on 18 June 2007. He was 76. He had written his own eulogy, which appeared as an obituary in the Daily Mail two days later.

== Legacy ==
In March 2007, he was ranked 29th on the list of the 100 Greatest Stand Up comedians in a poll conducted by Channel 4. The writer and performer Barry Cryer said when Manning died: "The thing about Bernard was that he looked funny, he sounded funny and he had excellent timing. It was just what he actually said that could be worrying."

In 2010, BBC Four commissioned Alice Nutter to write a biographical drama based on Manning's life. The screenplay was completed but cuts to the channel's budget led to the piece never being filmed.
