= Tommy Cannon =

English comic and singer (born 1938)

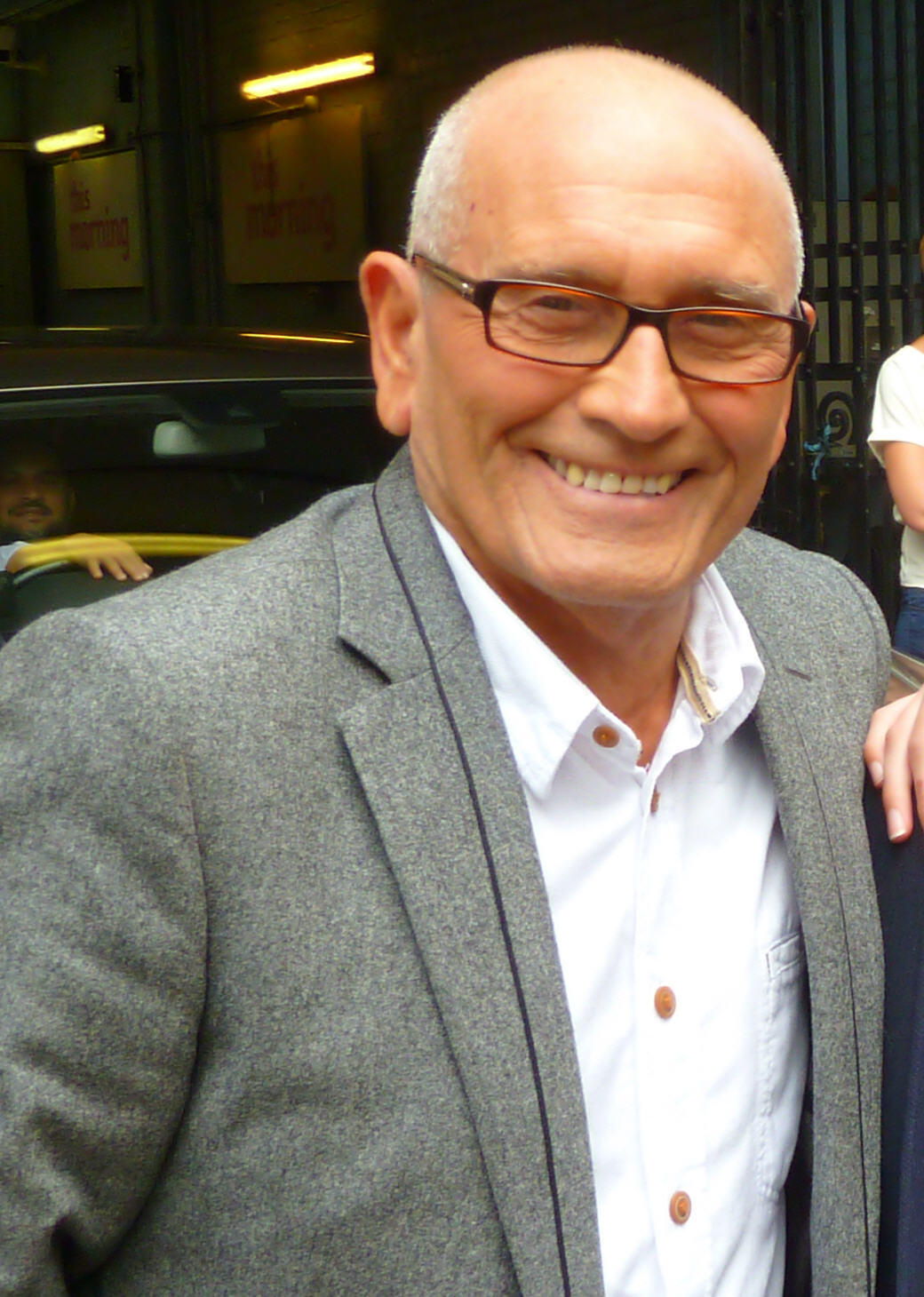
- Cannon in 2013
- Born: Thomas Derbyshire; 27 June 1938 (age 88); Oldham, Lancashire, England
- Occupations: Comic, actor, singer
- Years active: 1972–present
- Spouses: Margaret Leach (m. 1960; div. 1993); Hazel Derbyshire (m. 1994)
- Children: 5

Thomas Derbyshire (born 27 June 1938), known professionally as Tommy Cannon, is an English comic, actor and singer. He is best known as the straight man of the comic double act Cannon and Ball, until Bobby Ball's death in 2020, in TV programmes such as The Cannon and Ball Show.

== Cannon and Ball ==
Cannon was one half of comedy duo Cannon and Ball opposite his friend and colleague Bobby Ball (real name Robert Harper) before his death. They first appeared on television in 1968 on the talent show Opportunity Knocks. The duo's prime-time Saturday-night television series The Cannon and Ball Show was one of LWT's most successful series, with consistently high viewing ratings over 12 years. They starred in the film The Boys in Blue together in 1982 and guest-starred in the Eric Sykes slapstick film Mr H is Late in 1988. Other notable guest appearances were on The Kenny Everett Television Show in 1982 and Shooting Stars in 1996.

On 28 October 2020, Cannon's comedy partner Bobby Ball died at Blackpool Victoria Hospital after testing positive for COVID-19.

== Television ==
In late 2005, Cannon and Ball appeared in the fifth series of reality show I'm a Celebrity...Get Me Out of Here!.

In 2012, Cannon and Ball appeared in the third celebrity series of Coach Trip.

Cannon and Ball star in the Safestyle UK television advertisements. He made a one-off guest appearance in the 2014 Christmas special of Not Going Out on BBC One.

Cannon was cast in ITV soap opera Emmerdale as pensioner Derek in 2019. He appears in several episodes and features in a story that has "serious consequences" for regular characters. The character was killed off at the conclusion of Cannon's guest stint.

== Personal life ==
Cannon's first marriage was to Margaret Leach in 1960; they had two daughters, Janette (born 1961) and Julie (born 1964). They split up in 1989 but Margaret would not give Tommy a divorce. The couple later divorced in 1993. He lives in York with his second wife Hazel who is 20 years his junior, marrying her in Lytham on 23 September 1994. She had changed her surname from Winman to Derbyshire before marrying Tommy via deed poll. by whom he has three children.

Cannon was Chairman of Rochdale Association Football Club for a term until 1988.
