= The Comedians (1971 TV series) =

British television show (1971–1993)

- Genre: Comedy
- Directed by: Walter Butler; Dave Warwick
- Starring: Russ Abbot; Lennie Bennett; Stan Boardman; Jim Bowen; Frank Carson; Johnnie Casson; Les Dennis; Jimmy Jones; Bernard Manning; Tom O'Connor; Mike Reid; George Roper; Paul Shane; Roy Walker; Don Adams; Duggie Brown; Colin Crompton; Vince Earl; Stu Francis; Ken Goodwin; Jackie Hamilton; Bobby Knutt; Paul Melba; Mick Miller; Charlie Williams; Lee Wilson
- Composer: Derek Hilton
- Country of origin: United Kingdom
- Original language: English
- No. of series: 11
- No. of episodes: 81

Production
- Producers: Ian Hamilton; Johnnie Hamp
- Production locations: Granada Studios, Manchester
- Editors: D .L. Hayes; Ron Swayne
- Running time: 30 minutes (including adverts)
- Production company: Granada Television

Original release
- Network: ITV
- Release: 12 June 1971 – 28 December 1993

The Comedians is a British television show of the 1970s, later reprised in the mid-1980s, and early 1990s (1972–1993) produced by Johnnie Hamp of Granada Television. The show gave TV exposure to nightclub and working men's club comedians of the era, including Russ Abbot, Jim Bowen and Bernard Manning, many of whom went on to enjoy mainstream success in the 1980s. Filmed before a live audience in Manchester, comics each performed 20-minute sets, which were then edited together into half-hour shows featuring up to thirteen stand-up comics, and lasted a total of 81 episodes.

Working men's clubs were numerous in Britain, especially in the North of England and have been a useful training ground for artists, especially comedians. Most of these clubs are affiliated to the CIU (Working Men's Club and Institute Union) founded in 1862 by the Rev. Henry Solly. There are also political clubs, as well as Servicemen's Clubs affiliated to the Royal British Legion.

The Comedians began as an experiment for Granada TV on Saturday 12 June 1971 at 7pm on ITV1, and the last was a Christmas Special (60 mins) The Comedians Christmas Cracker shown on 28 December 1993, Tuesday at 10.45pm.

== Cast ==
Comedians appearing on the show included Russ Abbot (initially as Russ Roberts, later as Russ Abbott), Lennie Bennett, Stan Boardman, Jim Bowen, Jimmy Bright, Duggie Brown, Mike Burton, Dave Butler, Brian Carroll, Frank Carson, Johnnie Casson, Eddie Colinton, Mike Coyne, Colin Crompton, Bob Curtiss, Pauline Daniels, Charlie Daze, Les Dennis, Vince Earl, Steve Faye, Ray Fell, Eddie Flanagan, Stu Francis, Mike Goddard (known as Mike Goodwin in the early years of the show), Ken Goodwin, Jackie Hamilton, Jerry Harris, Jimmy Jones, Mike Kelly, George King, Bobby Knutt, Bernard Manning, Jimmy Marshall, Mike McCabe, Paul Melba, Mick Miller, Pat Mooney, Hal Nolan, Tom O'Connor, Tom Pepper, Bryn Phillips, Al Robbins, Don Reid, Mike Reid, George Roper, Harry Scott, Paul Shane, Pat Tansey, Sammy Thomas, Johnny Wager, Roy Walker, Jos White, Charlie Williams, Gerry Thomas, Lee Wilson and Lenny Windsor.

Also featured on the series were Shep's Banjo Boys, a seven-piece band comprising (for the first five series) Charlie Bentley (tenor banjo), John Drury (sousaphone), Andy Holdorf (trombone), John Orchard (piano), John Rollings (drums), Graham Shepherd (banjo) and Howard Shepherd (lead banjo). In 1973, the line-up was Mike Dexter (banjo), Tony "Tosh" Kennedy (sousaphone), Ged Martin (drums), Tony Pritchard (trombone), Graham Shepherd (banjo) and Howard "Shep" Shepherd (lead banjo).

== DVD releases ==
The first seven series including a DVD set (containing the first seven series broadcast 1971–74) have been released on DVD by Network.

== Transmissions ==
Series	Start date	End date	Episodes
1	12 June 1971	24 July 1971	7
2	18 September 1971	30 October 1971	7
3	18 February 1972	1 April 1972	7
4	14 July 1972	2 September 1972	7
5	17 November 1972	29 December 1972	7
6	7 April 1973	2 June 1973	8
7	26 January 1974	16 March 1974	7
8	22 July 1979	5 August 1979	13
8	23 November 1979	15 February 1980	13
9	2 June 1984	16 June 1984	3
10	1 June 1985	13 July 1985	7
11	9 July 1992	23 July 1992	5

=== Specials ===
Date	Entitle
24 December 1971	The Comedians' Christmas Party
22 December 1973	Christmas Comedians' Music Hall
28 December 1993	The Comedians' Christmas Cracker
