= Mick Miller (comedian) =

English stand-up comedian

- Born: Michael Lawton; 25 February 1950 (age 76); Liverpool, England
- Notable work: The Comedians

Comedy career
- Years active: 1970s–present
- Medium: Stand-up comedy

Michael Lawton (born 25 February 1950), known professionally as Mick Miller, is an English stand-up comedian who has had a long career on the live comedy circuit and has a trademark haircut of a bald head with long hair down the sides.

== Early days ==
Miller was born on 25 February 1950 in Liverpool. Miller's first ambition was to be a footballer. He played as a goalkeeper, and as a boy he signed for Port Vale when Stanley Matthews was the club's general manager and had a trial for the England youth team. However, at 5 ft 9 in (1.75 m) he was too small. He was given a free transfer to Sandbach Ramblers and later played for Winsford United ahead of Neville Southall. He worked as a crane driver during his time as a semi-professional footballer.

When he left football, he began performing at Pontins, where he became interested in stand-up comedy. After being chief comedian at various Pontins venues, he moved to the north of England and began a career in the clubs.

== Stand-up career ==
Having won his heat on the talent show New Faces, Miller was then signed to support Chuck Berry on tour.

Since then, he has been a regular at Blackpool, working men's clubs, cruises and after-dinner speeches. His shows have been released on DVD, and he has made many TV appearances.

Miller performed at the 2025 Royal Variety Performance.

== Television appearances ==
Miller was a regular on the 1970s stand-up show The Comedians, co-presented The Funny Side, regularly appeared on Today With Des and Mel and has been a guest on Blankety Blank, They Think It's All Over and Des O'Connor Tonight.

He acted in Alan Bleasdale's 1978 Play for Today Scully's New Year. In it, he played the part of a wannabe stand-up comedian.

In 1993, Miller guested for Chester City in the Granada football Go for Goal quiz show alongside Arthur Albiston and Joe Hinnigan. Chester City reached the final before losing to Preston North End.

In 2005, he took part in the reality TV show Kings Of Comedy alongside Stan Boardman, Janey Godley, Andrew Maxwell, Boothby Graffoe and David Copperfield.

In 2008 and 2009, he made several appearances on the BBC Three sitcom Ideal, as the father of Johnny Vegas's Moz.

In 2011, he appeared on the ITV show Comedy Rocks with Jason Manford and, in December, he appeared on the Royal Variety Performance.

In 2015, he appeared in the first series of Peter Kay's Car Share playing the character Tony in Episode 6, which was shown on BBC One.

As of April 2018, Miller was appearing in ITV's Last Laugh in Vegas.
