= Win, Lose or Draw (British game show) =

British television game show

- Created by: Burt Reynolds; Bert Convy
- Presented by: Danny Baker (1990–1993); Darren Day (Teen version); Shane Richie (1994); Bob Mills (1995–1998); Liza Tarbuck (2004, late night version)
- Country of origin: United Kingdom
- Original language: English
- No. of series: 9 (Main series); 1 (Teen series); 1 (Late series)
- No. of episodes: 381 (Main series); 8 (Teen series); 20 (Late series)

Production
- Running time: 30 mins (inc. adverts)
- Production companies: Scottish Television (STV Studios)

Original release
- Network: ITV
- Release: 30 January 1990 – 27 February 1998
- Release: 14 April – 22 October 2004

Related
- Win, Lose or Draw (US version); Draw It!

Win, Lose or Draw is a British television game show that aired for nine series in the ITV daytime schedule from 1990 to 1998, produced by Scottish Television. The game was based on the American television game show of the same name.

== Format ==
Win, Lose or Draw was essentially based on the board game Pictionary. There were two teams, each composed of two celebrities and one member of the public. Three women played against three men. The teams took turns guessing a phrase, title, or thing that one teammate was drawing on a large pad of paper with markers. There's no talking by the one who was drawing, nor inscription of letters, numbers, or symbols. However, if a team mentioned a word that was part of the answer, the player at the sketchpad could write it. By series 3, correct answer within the first 30 seconds won £50 which decreased to £30 after the first 30 seconds. If time expired, the other team took one guess for £20. In the first series, the value started at £25 and decreased to £20 after the first 30 seconds, with a steal by the other team earning £10. In the final round, one player from each team would do the drawing for two minutes and each team could pass twice. Each correct answer awarded £10 and after each team took a turn in that final round, the winner of the most cash earned a bonus of £100.

On the "Teen" series, two boys would be teamed with a male celebrity against a female celebrity teamed with two girls. In the first round, one team member would draw up to 10 clues to a puzzle within two minutes. Each drawing the team guessed correctly scored five points. After two minutes, if the team could guess who or what the clues referred to, the team scored 25 points. Failure to guess correctly allowed the other team to guess the same puzzle. After each team played the first round, the second round involved one drawer from each team drawing up to three two-word phrases, each worth 15 points. The third round involved each drawer drawing clues about a famous person. A correct guess scored 50 points after one clue, 30 after two clues, 20 after three clues, and finally 10 points after four clues. A wrong guess allowed the other team to steal the points. In the speed round, one player did the drawing for 90 seconds and each correct guess from the drawer's teammates scored 10 points. After both teams played the speed round, the team with the highest total score won a prize package.

A "late" edition of the show hosted by Liza Tarbuck was broadcast in 2004, with team captains Sue Perkins and Ed Hall. Guests usually had alcoholic drinks on hand throughout the recording, and due to its late night timeslot, there was little censorship of swearing and the game rules were frequently bent, if not broken. Score values started at five points and decreased to three points after the first 30 seconds. After one minute expired, a steal by the opposing team scored two points. Each correct guess in the speed round earned one point.

== Celebrity guests ==
=== Series 1 (1990) ===
- Week 1 – Annabel Croft, Ulrika Jonsson, Emlyn Hughes, David Jensen
- Week 2 – Michaela Strachan, Sandi Toksvig, Tommy Boyd, Peter Simon
- Week 3 – Kate Copstick, Gail McKenna, Nicky Campbell, Pat Sharp
- Week 4 – Andrea Boardman, Anthea Turner, Alistair Divall, Peter Simon
- Week 5 – Coleen Nolan, Maureen Nolan, Paul Coia, Paul Ross
- Week 6 – Kate Copstick, Debbie Rix, John Millar, Peter Simon
- Week 7 – Carol Smillie, Jane Tucker, Rod Burton, Timmy Mallett

=== Series 2 (1991) ===
- Week 1 – Peter Duncan, Peter Simon, Linda Robson, Pauline Quirke
- Week 2 – Cheryl Baker, Helen Brumby, John Eccleston, Gordon Inglis
- Week 3 – David Yip, James MacPherson, Hilary O'Neil, Ellis Ward
- Week 4 – Gaby Roslin, Andrew O'Connor, Jessica Martin, Derek Lord
- Week 5 – Debbie Greenwood, Liz Kershaw, John Jeffrey, Ross King
- Week 6 – Jakki Brambles, Kate Copstick, Adrian Walsh, David Wilkie
- Week 7 – Caroline Ashley, Carol Smillie, Andy Crane, Gareth Jones

=== Series 3 (1992) ===
- Week 1 – Dana, Susan Maughan, Jeff Stevenson, Allan Stewart
- Week 2 – Helen Atkinson-Wood, Bonnie Langford, Bernie Clifton, Duncan Goodhew
- Week 3 – Lorraine Chase, Blythe Duff, Simon Biagi, Mike Read
- Week 4 – Sarah Greene, Kate Robbins, Steve Jones, Mike Smith
- Week 5 – Faith Brown, Gordon MacArthur, Nula Conwell, Andrew Paul

=== Series 4 (1993) ===
- Week 1 – Linda Lusardi, Jan Ravens, Bob Mills, Nick Revell
- Week 2 – Sue Carpenter, Coleen Nolan, Garry Bushell, Paul Ross
- Week 3 – Emma Forbes, Barbara Windsor, Andy Gray, Peter Simon
- Week 4 – Janet Ellis, Caron Keating, Nick Hancock, Mark Kermode
- Week 5 – Pauline Quirke, Linda Robson, Tommy Boyd, Shane Richie

=== Series 5 (1994) ===
- Week 1 – Panther, Saracen, Dani Behr, Barry McGuigan
- Week 2 – Carol Smillie, Paul Coia, Mr Motivator, Annabel Croft
- Week 3 – Debbie Greenwood, Linda Lusardi, Peter Simon, Mike Sterling
- Week 4 – Gareth Jones, Steve Johnson, Penny Smith, Janet Ellis
- Week 5 – Paul Ross, Kate Robbins, Linzi Hateley, Joe Pasquale
- Week 6 – Gary Bushell, Richard Digance, Annabel Giles, Caron Keating
- Week 7 – Anna Walker, Mike Osman, DJ Normski, Andrea Boardman
- Week 8 – Judi Spiers, Jenny Powell, Ross Newton, Roger De Courcey
- Week 9 – Gary Martin, Richard Calkin, Debbie Gibson, Sally Ann Triplett
- Week 10 – Suzanne Dando, Gary Davies, Allan Stewart, Kathy Tayler
- Week 11 – Darren Day, Sally Meen, Tessa Sanderson, Geoff Stevenson
- Week 12 – Falcon, Trojan, Bob Mills, Liz Kershaw
- Week 13 – Coleen Nolan, Denise Nolan, Tommy Cannon, Bobby Ball

=== Series 6 (1995) ===
- Week 1 – Yvette Fielding, Anna Walker, Kriss Akabusi, Andy Crane
- Week 2 – Paul Zenon, Windsor Davies, Philippa Forrester, Kate Robbins
- Week 3 – Carol Smillie, Mickey Hutton, Faith Brown, Brendan O'Carroll
- Week 4 – Andrea Boardman, Kate Copstick, Nicholas Parsons, Ainsley Harriott
- Week 5 – Ally McCoist, Danny Baker, Malandra Burrows, Carol Sarler
- Week 6 – Vicki Michelle, Nina Myskow, Andrew O'Connor, Allan Stewart
- Week 7 – Paul Coia, Debbie Greenwood, Jilly Goolden, Johnny Vaughan
- Week 8 – Jo Brand, Dale Winton, Liza Tarbuck, Nick Hancock
- Week 9 – Syd Little, Eddie Large, Linda Lusardi, Nightshade
- Week 10 – Lionel Blair, Ian Krankie, Janet Krankie, Judi Spiers

=== Series 7 (1996) ===
- Week 1 – Yvette Fielding, Windsor Davies, Cheryl Baker, Kriss Akabusi
- Week 2 – Faith Brown, Saracen, Anna Walker, Joe Pasquale
- Week 3 – Ricky Tomlinson, Mickey Hutton, Linda Lusardi, Jenny Powell
- Week 4 – Philippa Forrester, Judi Spiers, Andrew Paul, Billy Pearce
- Week 5 – Ronni Ancona, Liza Tarbuck, Nick Hancock, Gordon Kennedy
- Week 6 – Linda Nolan, Janet Krankie, Ian Krankie, Nicholas Parsons
- Week 7 & 8 – Vanessa Feltz, Lorraine Kelly, Ainsley Harriott, Lee Hurst
- Week 9 – Bonnie Langford, Linda Nolan, Paul Ross, Robert Duncan
- Week 10 – Craig Doyle, Sian Lloyd, Debbie Greenwood, Paul Coia
- Week 11 – ?, ?, ?, ?
- Week 12 – C.P. Grogan, Kate Williams, Kevin Day, Christopher Cazenove
- Week 13 – Maria McErlane, Michaela Strachan, Jim Bowen, Tim Vincent
- Week 14 – Ann Bryson, Annabel Giles, Phill Jupitus, Norman Pace
- Week 15 – Susan Brookes, Sue Jenkins, Ross King, James MacPherson
- Week 16 – Andrea Boardman, Lesley Vickerage, Gareth Jones, Paul Zenon
- Week 17 – Carol Smillie, Blythe Duff, Andy Cameron, Ally McCoist

=== Series 8 (1997) ===
- Week 1 – Davina McCall, Johnny Vaughan, Elaine C. Smith, Roger Black
- Week 2 – Liza Tarbuck, Paul Ross, Clare Grogan, Colin McCredie
- Week 3 – Cheryl Baker, Sian Lloyd, Fred MacAulay, John Parrott
- Week 4 – Ann Bryson, Annabel Giles, Karl Howman, Tony Roper
- Week 5 – Tessa Sanderson, Allan Stewart, Roy Walker, Jet
- Week 6 – Simon Biagi, Frazer Hines, Zodiac, Michaela Strachan
- Week 7 – Phill Jupitus, Ken Morley, Kate Robbins, Judi Spiers

=== Series 9 (1998) ===
- Week 1 – Kelly Holmes, Syd Little, Eddie Large, Linda Nolan
- Week 2 – Carol Smillie, Ann Bryson, Andy Kane, Shaun Williamson
- Week 3 – Isla Fisher, John Regis, Maria McErlane, Glenn Hugill
- Week 4 – Ian Kelsey, Colin McCredie, Hilary O'Neil, Lisa Riley
- Week 5 – Kevin Woodford, Judi Spiers, Kevin Lloyd, Sophie Lawrence
- Week 6 – Jo Brand, Mickey Hutton, Liza Tarbuck, Tim Vincent
- Week 7 – Sally Gunnell, Joe Pasquale, Davina McCall, Nick Cochrane
- Week 8 – Julie Peasgood, John Parrott, Angela Griffin, Simeon Courtie

== Transmissions ==
=== Original series ===
Series	Start date	End date	Episodes
1	30 January 1990	23 March 1990	28
2	29 April 1991	14 June 1991	28
3	7 September 1992	9 October 1992	25
4	26 July 1993	27 August 1993	25
5	3 January 1994	1 April 1994	65
6	1 May 1995	7 July 1995	50
7	1 January 1996	26 April 1996	85
8	6 January 1997	28 February 1997	35
9	5 January 1998	27 February 1998	40

=== Teen series ===
Series	Start date	End date	Episodes
1	2 January 1993	20 February 1993	8

=== Late series ===
Series	Start date	End date	Episodes
1	14 April 2004	22 October 2004	20
