= You Bet! =

British television game show (1988–1997, 2024–2025)

- Genre: Game show
- Based on: Wetten, dass..? by Frank Elstner
- Presented by: Bruce Forsyth (1988–1990); Matthew Kelly (1991–1995); Darren Day (1996–1997); Holly Willoughby (2024); Stephen Mulhern (2024–2025)
- Starring: Ellis Ward (1988–1991); Diane Youdale (1996); Sarah Matravers (1997)
- Voices of: Bobby Bragg (1996–1997)
- Composer: Alan Lisk (1988); Jonathan Sorrell (1989–1996); Simon Webb (1997); Marc Sylvan (2024–2025)
- Country of origin: United Kingdom
- Original language: English
- No. of series: 10 (original); 2 (revival)
- No. of episodes: 103 (including 5 specials)

Production
- Producer: Richard Hearsey (1988)
- Production locations: Shepperton Studios (1988, 1990–1995); Limehouse Studios (1989); Pinewood Studios (1996); London Arena (1997); Shinfield Studios (2024); Various (2025)
- Running time: 60 minutes (1988–1997, 2025); 75 minutes (2024) (including adverts)
- Production companies: LWT (1988–1997); Rollercoaster Television (2024–2025)

Original release
- Network: ITV
- Release: 20 February 1988 – 12 April 1997
- Release: 7 December 2024 – 27 December 2025

Related
- Wetten, dass..? Wanna Bet?

You Bet! is a British game show, based on the German series Wetten, dass..?, that originally aired on ITV for ten series and a number of specials between 20 February 1988 and 12 April 1997, and was revived on 7 December 2024. It was initially hosted by Bruce Forsyth (1988–1990), then by Matthew Kelly (1991–1995) and finally Darren Day (1996–1997). In August 2024, ITV announced that the show would be returning for two special episodes later that year with Stephen Mulhern and Holly Willoughby as hosts.

== Format ==
A panel of celebrities would bet on the ability of members of the public to achieve unlikely challenges and stunts, which they had usually planned and rehearsed many times, within a limited amount of time. The studio audience would also place a bet on the outcomes. The panellists would receive points for each outcome they predicted correctly, based on the percentage of the studio audience that also placed a correct bet. The celebrity sponsoring the challenge always had to bet that their challenger would be successful. The accumulated total of points achieved by the celebrities would be added to the points totalled by the studio audience, increased several times over, converted into pounds and donated to a charity chosen by the celebrity panellist who had achieved the highest score.

== Timeline ==
=== 1988 ===
Each week, there would be four challenges, some in the studio and some on location presented by Ellis Ward. The panellists would each "sponsor" a challenge, and Bruce Forsyth would also sponsor one. If the challenge sponsored by the panellist or Bruce Forsyth was not achieved, that sponsor would have to do a forfeit. (e.g., being a golf caddie or air steward for the day). (In the case of Forsyth's challenge, the majority vote determined Forsyth's prediction; an incorrect prediction forced Forsyth to do his forfeit. His explanation for this part was usually, "You're now betting for the fate of Forsyth in the form of a forfeit. If you're right, I'm alright; but if you're wrong, I'm right in it!") It was either broadcast in the studio on the same show or broadcast on location on the following week's show. The show dropped the talk show aspects of Wetten, dass...? and concentrated on the challenges, thus reducing the running time from 2 to 3 hours to 1 hour. The original theme tune was composed by Alan Lisk, better known for penning the theme tune to Men Behaving Badly. The show's airing slot was originally on Saturday nights.

The show closed with Forsyth doing a rap, along with the audience shouting back every "You Bet!" line: "Do you wanna bet on it? You bet! Well you'd betta get on it? You bet! So don't fret, get set are you ready? You Bet! Goodnight, God bless, I'll see you next week, bye!"

=== 1989–1990 ===
A new theme tune composed by Jonathan Sorrell was introduced in the show's second series.

=== Spring 1991 ===
Series four saw some massive changes following the departure of Forsyth at the end of series three for concentration on hosting other shows like The Generation Game, Play Your Cards Right and The Price is Right. A new logo was introduced and Matthew Kelly took over as host. Also, the challenges increased from four to five, which meant that Ward got involved, with her sponsoring challenges as well. Another change from the Forsyth era was that the celebrity guests could no longer specify the nature of their forfeit should their challenge fail – instead, they had to choose from a list of pre-defined forfeits hidden under cryptic statements – for instance "Dinner Coming Up" meant that the forfeit was to try and eat whilst riding a roller-coaster. Kelly also got involved in doing the work on location challenges, as well as Ward. Finally, if Kelly's challenge ended in failure, he had to do his forfeit, regardless of the audience's prediction.

=== Autumn 1991 ===
Series five's airing slot was moved from Saturday to Friday nights and a reworked version of the theme tune was introduced.

=== 1992–1993 ===
The departure of Ward as co-host led to the number of celebrity guests being increased from three to four per show and Kelly doing all the work on location challenges.

=== 1994 ===
The show's airing slot was moved back to Saturday nights and the remaining episodes of the seventh series were sponsored by Daily Mirror.

=== 1995 ===
For the show's eighth series, it was decided there would be no more forfeits for both the celebrities and host Matthew Kelly when sponsoring their challenges until the forfeits were reinstated in for series nine in 1996 after Darren Day had taken over from Matthew Kelly as host. Instead, they introduced the celebrity challenge, where the lowest celebrity scorer would do only one forfeit challenge, which would be broadcast in the following week's show. The public then got to vote in at home to donate £1,000 to a charity of their choice if the celebrity succeeded or failed the challenge. The set was replaced by a new "arena" that allowed much more floor space for the challenges. It was during series eight when Matthew Kelly had announced his intention to leave the show after four years to concentrate on hosting Stars in Their Eyes. The viewers' phone vote for the celebrity challenge was dropped after series eight was shown.

=== 1996 ===
For series nine, actor Darren Day took over as host from Kelly who had left the show to concentrate hosting Stars in Their Eyes. The role of co-host that had been absent during series six–eight following the departure of Ward at the end of series five was reinstated for all the work in the location challenges. For this penultimate original series, Diane Youdale, who was better known as Jet from the UK series of Gladiators, would take over as the new co-host with the number of celebrity guests being from four to three. The forfeits, having been absent from the earlier series also returned to the show, but they were not chosen by the celebrity guests. They were automatically chosen by the crew at the end of each show for the celebrity who had lowest score in the show.

=== 1997 ===
The show introduced a new item for the celebrities, they could play their YOU BET! BONUS CARD, which meant their points would be doubled if they successfully guessed the outcome of a challenge (which can only be played once in the entire show). The celebrity challenge returned to the show, and the audience got to choose which challenge they would choose for the lowest scoring celebrity at the end of the show from two choices with cryptic clue titles (e.g., "Ooh! That's better!" or "Dangling Down"). Sarah Matravers, well known as a gong girl from Take Your Pick!, replaced Youdale as co-host for this final original series. A new theme tune was introduced, composed by Simon Webb.

=== 2024–2025 ===
After a 27-year-hiatus, Stephen Mulhern and Holly Willoughby became the new co-hosts for the revived series, which contained only two episodes; the first of these was aired on a Saturday night and the second on a Sunday night. The number of celebrity guests per show was again increased from three to four, with Rob Beckett appearing on both shows. A new theme was composed by Marc Sylvan.

In March 2025, Holly Willoughby declined the opportunity to host a new series.

In a series in autumn 2025, Stephen Mulhern brought the show on tour across England to landmarks like Goodwood Circuit, Thorpe Park, Queen Elizabeth Olympic Park, Boscombe Pier, The Leeds Studios, Harewood Speed Hillclimb, Liverpool City Centre and Kimbolton Castle. The show was aired on a permanent Saturday night slot. The number of celebrity guests per show was again reduced from four to three and the forfeit finale was no more plus the show was no longer presented from a traditional studio.

== Episodes ==
The coloured backgrounds denote the result of each of the shows:

– indicates the celebrity successfully backed their challenge and avoided their forfeit (Series 1–7).
– indicates the celebrity failed to back their challenge and received their forfeit (Series 1–7).
BOLD – indicates the celebrity scored the most points and received money for their chosen charity.
ITALIC – indicates the celebrity scored the fewest points and received a celebrity challenge/forfeit (Series 8–10, 2024 revival).

=== Series 1 (1988) ===
Episode	First broadcast	Celebrities		
1x01	20 February 1988	Richard Digance	Kate Robbins	**Dickie Davies**
1x01	20 February 1988	184	54	**238**
1x02	27 February 1988	**Kenny Sansom**	Cheryl Baker	Spike Milligan
1x02	27 February 1988	**196**	0	145
1x03	5 March 1988	Nerys Hughes	Derek Griffiths	**Kenny Lynch**
1x03	5 March 1988	173	113	**196**
1x04	12 March 1988	Windsor Davies	**Linford Christie**	Anneka Rice
1x04	12 March 1988	108	**222**	162
1x05	19 March 1988	**Ross Davidson**	Lynsey De Paul	Jimmy Hill
1x05	19 March 1988	**203**	143	143
1x06	26 March 1988	Gloria Hunniford	**John Fashanu**	Sandra Dickinson
1x06	26 March 1988	114	**139**	107

=== Series 2 (1989) ===
Episode	First broadcast	Celebrities		
2x01	28 January 1989	Adrian Moorhouse	Debbie Greenwood	Harvey Smith
2x01	28 January 1989	?	?	?
2x02	4 February 1989	Suzanne Dando	Brian Johnston	Eddie Kidd
2x02	4 February 1989	?	?	?
2x03	11 February 1989	Wendy Richard	Roy Castle	David Wilkie
2x03	11 February 1989	?	?	?
2x04	18 February 1989	**Henry Cooper**	Nino Firetto	Thora Hird
2x04	18 February 1989	**149**	122	71
2x05	25 February 1989	David Steel	Janice Long	Dave Beasant
2x05	25 February 1989	?	?	?
2x06	4 March 1989	Nicky Campbell	Jill Gascoine	Simon Williams
2x06	4 March 1989	?	?	?
2x07	11 March 1989	Claire Rayner	Melvyn Hayes	**Paul Gascoigne**
2x07	11 March 1989	96	110	**154**
2x08	18 March 1989	Bob Holness	**Suzi Quatro**	John McCririck
2x08	18 March 1989	158	**266**	63
2x09	25 March 1989	Mark Walker	Jayne Irving	Nicholas Parsons
2x09	25 March 1989	?	?	?
2x10	1 April 1989	Bruno Brookes	Helen Shapiro	Geoff Capes
2x10	1 April 1989	?	?	?

=== Series 3 (1990) ===
Episode	First broadcast	Celebrities		
3x01	17 February 1990	Duncan Goodhew	Sally James	Kriss Akabusi
3x01	17 February 1990	?	?	?
3x02	24 February 1990	Keith Chegwin	Lawrie McMenemy	Annabel Croft
3x02	24 February 1990	?	?	?
3x03	3 March 1990	Gary Stretch	Fern Britton	Sylvester McCoy
3x03	3 March 1990	?	?	?
3x04	10 March 1990	Sharron Davies	Jon Iles	Bob Carolgees
3x04	10 March 1990	?	?	?
3x05	17 March 1990	Bill Tidy	Graeme Garden	Floella Benjamin
3x05	17 March 1990	?	?	?
3x06	24 March 1990	Letitia Dean	Barry McGuigan	Bobby Davro
3x06	24 March 1990	?	?	?
3x07	31 March 1990	Alan Freeman	**Jan Leeming**	Bob Champion
3x07	31 March 1990	165	**200**	146
3x08	7 April 1990	Leslie Crowther	Tessa Sanderson	Chris Serle
3x08	7 April 1990	?	?	?
3x09	14 April 1990	Peter Alliss	Linda Lusardi	James Marcus
3x09	14 April 1990	?	?	?
3x10	21 April 1990	Carmen Silvera	Sean Kerly	Trevor Brooking
3x10	21 April 1990	?	?	?

=== Series 4 (Spring 1991) ===
Episode	First broadcast	Celebrities		
4x01	16 February 1991	**Nick Skelton**	Vicki Michelle	**Brian Glover**
4x01	16 February 1991	**224**	191	**224**
4x02	23 February 1991	Eric Bristow	Gemma Craven	**David Jensen**
4x02	23 February 1991	166	163	**235**
4x03	2 March 1991	**Annabel Giles**	Andrew O'Connor	Johnny Briggs
4x03	2 March 1991	**176**	136	136
4x04	9 March 1991	**Dame Hilda Bracket**	Cliff Thorburn	Michaela Strachan
4x04	9 March 1991	**210**	159	168
4x05	16 March 1991	Virginia Leng	**Roy Walker**	Frank Bruno
4x05	16 March 1991	125	**149**	81
4x06	23 March 1991	Liz Hobbs	**Roger Black**	Paul Shane
4x06	23 March 1991	102	**203**	122
4x07	30 March 1991	Brian Conley	Kim Goody	**Graham Cole**
4x07	30 March 1991	161	177	**183**
4x08	6 April 1991	Lynda Baron	Tracy Edwards	**Gareth Jones**
4x08	6 April 1991	144	140	**145**
4x09	13 April 1991	Geoffrey Durham	Trudie Goodwin	**Ian McCaskill**
4x09	13 April 1991	219	270	**290**
4x10	20 April 1991	**John Blashford-Snell**	Spike Milligan	Sheila Ferguson
4x10	20 April 1991	**226**	45	153

=== Series 5 (Autumn 1991) ===
Episode	First broadcast	Celebrities		
5x01	6 September 1991	Keith Chegwin	Judi Spiers	**Barry McGuigan**
5x01	6 September 1991	109	219	**263**
5x02	13 September 1991	**Tessa Sanderson**	John Virgo	Bob Carolgees
5x02	13 September 1991	**208**	150	190
5x03	20 September 1991	Ruth Madoc	**Bruno Brookes**	Evadne Hinge
5x03	20 September 1991	220	**225**	97
5x04	27 September 1991	**Willie Thorne**	Diane Keen	Timmy Mallett
5x04	27 September 1991	**244**	132	159
5x05	11 October 1991	**Fred Trueman**	Bobby Davro	Geoff Capes
5x05	11 October 1991	**241**	44	197
5x06	18 October 1991	Bella Emberg	**Trevor Brooking**	Lesley Joseph
5x06	18 October 1991	242	**355**	169
5x07	25 October 1991	Richard Noble	Anne Charleston	**Pat Sharp**
5x07	25 October 1991	62	148	**159**
5x08	1 November 1991	Roy Hudd	Michael Melia	**Nerys Hughes**
5x08	1 November 1991	164	167	**204**
5x09	8 November 1991	Rosie Barnes	Dora Bryan	**John Sachs**
5x09	8 November 1991	109	179	**182**
5x10	15 November 1991	Craig Charles	**Mark Wingett**	Kriss Akabusi
5x10	15 November 1991	193	**225**	0

=== Series 6 (1992) ===
Episode	First broadcast	Celebrities			
6x01	4 September 1992	Henry Cooper	Kim Hartman	David Lawrence	**Geoffrey Durham**
6x01	4 September 1992	139	206	120	**249**
6x02	11 September 1992	Derek Redmond	Sarah Kennedy	**Brian Johnston**	Sharron Davies
6x02	11 September 1992	102	104	**188**	182
6x03	18 September 1992	Jessica Martin	**Steve Ovett**	Jack Tinker	Annabel Giles
6x03	18 September 1992	77	**250**	69	179
6x04	25 September 1992	Jilly Curry	Melvyn Hayes	**Garry Herbert**	Sally James
6x04	25 September 1992	60	91	**172**	140
6x05	2 October 1992	**John Regis**	John Inman	Linda Lusardi	Gary Mason
6x05	2 October 1992	**197**	120	180	149
6x06	10 October 1992	**John Conteh**	Lizzie Webb	Kevin Lloyd	Floella Benjamin
6x06	10 October 1992	**311**	200	227	241
6x07	16 October 1992	**Dame Hilda Bracket**	Ulrika Jonsson	Peter Scudamore	Ken Morley
6x07	16 October 1992	**263**	169	153	233
6x08	23 October 1992	**Sandi Toksvig**	Andrew O'Connor	"Meryl Streep"*	Gareth Marriott
6x08	23 October 1992	**240**	141	209	233
6x09	30 October 1992	Brian Moore	**Cheryl Baker**	Tom O'Connor	Liz Kershaw
6x09	30 October 1992	237	**291**	174	150
6x10	6 November 1992	Andi Peters	**Graham Cole**	Sheila Ferguson	**Dennis Taylor**
6x10	6 November 1992	231	**272**	252	**272**

- Audience member Susan Elvy was asked to play the part of Meryl Streep throughout the show

=== Christmas Special (1992) ===
First broadcast	Celebrities			
26 December 1992	Kriss Akabusi	Judi Spiers	**Annabel Giles**	Andrew O'Connor
26 December 1992	226	304	**332**	78

=== Series 7 (1993–1994) ===
Episode	First broadcast	Celebrities			
7x01	10 September 1993	Keith Barron	Michael Carruth	Ross King	**Les Hill**
7x01	10 September 1993	154	205	192	**258**
7x02	17 September 1993	Wendy Richard	Ben Clarke	**Vinnie Jones**	DJ Normski
7x02	17 September 1993	150	150	**273**	190
7x03	24 September 1993	**Suzanne Dando**	Eamonn Holmes	Geoff Capes	Nicola Stapleton
7x03	24 September 1993	**269**	135	179	212
7x04	1 October 1993	Paul Ross	Bryan Murray	Andrew Sachs	**Ted Robbins**
7x04	1 October 1993	254	180	255	**322**
7x05	8 October 1993	Anne Charleston	Annabel Croft	**Barry McGuigan**	Sharon Duce
7x05	8 October 1993	148	235	**290**	203
7x06	15 October 1993	Gareth Hunt	**Ruth Madoc**	David Jensen	Fern Britton
7x06	15 October 1993	283	**294**	236	203
7x07	22 October 1993	Paula Hamilton	**Alan Titchmarsh**	Bobby Davro	James Whale
7x07	22 October 1993	246	**289**	279	112
7x08	12 March 1994	Adam Woodyatt	**Michaela Strachan**	David Yip	**Sally Gunnell**
7x08	12 March 1994	61	**232**	142	**232**
7x09	19 March 1994	Gary Mason	Carol Thatcher	**Jayne Irving**	David Hamilton
7x09	19 March 1994	220	180	**232**	164
7x10	26 March 1994	Lucinda Green	**Jeremy Guscott**	**Danniella Westbrook**	John Inman
7x10	26 March 1994	222	**309**	**309**	146
7x11	2 April 1994	Andrew Mackintosh	Gareth Chilcott	**Liz McColgan**	Gloria Hunniford
7x11	2 April 1994	171	179	**324**	153
7x12	9 April 1994	Victoria Wicks	Mark Blundell	**Valerie Singleton**	**Pat Sharp**
7x12	9 April 1994	268	214	**282**	**282**
7x13	16 April 1994	Bob Carolgees	**Anna Walker**	Melvyn Hayes	Louise Jameson
7x13	16 April 1994	181	**274**	220	173
7x14	23 April 1994	Tony Jarrett	**Mike Gatting**	Mo Moreland	Michael Fish
7x14	23 April 1994	174	**240**	195	230
7x15	30 April 1994	Annabel Giles	Chris Boardman	**Nanette Newman**	Gareth Hunt
7x15	30 April 1994	126	204	**217**	164

=== Celebrity Special (1994) ===
First broadcast	Celebrities			
5 March 1994	John Regis	**Bruno Brookes**	Emma Forbes	Linda Lusardi
5 March 1994	198	**294**	289	150

=== Series 8 (1995) ===
Episode	First broadcast	Celebrities			
8x01	25 February 1995	**Pat Sharp**	Jean Boht	Allan Lamb	Sharon Duce
8x01	25 February 1995	**303**	148	81	222
8x02	4 March 1995	Bob Carolgees	**Carol Smillie**	Mark Blundell	Sarah Greene
8x02	4 March 1995	162	**284**	271	191
8x03	11 March 1995	**Geoff Capes**	Alan Titchmarsh	Willie Thorne	Bobby Davro
8x03	11 March 1995	**191**	84	84	8
8x04	18 March 1995	Jim Bowen	**Gemma Craven**	Gordon Burns	**John Altman**
8x04	18 March 1995	0	**316**	291	**316**
8x05	25 March 1995	James Whale	**Michaela Strachan**	**Tony Jarrett**	David Yip
8x05	25 March 1995	147	**351**	**351**	170
8x06	1 April 1995	Bernard Cribbins	Mr Motivator	**Nick Gillingham**	Ross King
8x06	1 April 1995	293	159	**302**	143
8x07	8 April 1995	Jilly Goolden	**Gareth Chilcott**	Dale Winton	Elizabeth Dawn
8x07	8 April 1995	303	**357**	269	129
8x08	15 April 1995	**Bruno Brookes**	Kate Copstick	Oliver Skeete	Robert Llewellyn
8x08	15 April 1995	**199**	114	54	69
8x09	22 April 1995	John Regis	**Jessica Martin**	Bobby George	Billy Pearce
8x09	22 April 1995	154	**273**	216	168
8x10	29 April 1995	Richard Vranch	**Judi Spiers**	Tony Hawks	Annabel Giles
8x10	29 April 1995	201	**323**	241	204

=== Series 9 (1996) ===
Episode	First broadcast	Celebrities		
9x01	1 June 1996	Joe Pasquale	**Sonia Evans**	Sally Meen
9x01	1 June 1996	73	**206**	113
9x02	8 June 1996	Anthea Turner	**Vinnie Jones**	Caron Keating
9x02	8 June 1996	204	**280**	192
9x03	29 June 1996	Anthony McPartlin	Declan Donnelly	**Michelle Collins**
9x03	29 June 1996	168	169	**289**
9x04	6 July 1996	Ian St John	**Carol Smillie**	Kriss Akabusi
9x04	6 July 1996	135	**189**	79
9x05	13 July 1996	Terry Christian	Samantha Fox	**Tim Vincent**
9x05	13 July 1996	204	186	**264**
9x06	20 July 1996	**Garry Bushell**	Dale Winton	Wendy Richard
9x06	20 July 1996	**338**	96	305
9x07	27 July 1996	Lee Hurst	**Louise Nurding**	Paul Ross
9x07	27 July 1996	187	**240**	69
9x08	3 August 1996	**Billy Pearce**	Jenny Powell	Toby Anstis
9x08	3 August 1996	**214**	27	90
9x09	10 August 1996	**Johnny Herbert**	Vanessa Feltz	Pat Sharp
9x09	10 August 1996	**290**	34	284
9x10	17 August 1996	**Carol Vorderman**	Andrew O'Connor	Carolyn Marshall
9x10	17 August 1996	**268**	76	118

=== Series 10 (1997) ===
Episode	First broadcast	Celebrities		
10x01	8 February 1997	Jonathan Coleman	Jenny Powell	**Ian Wright**
10x01	8 February 1997	186	347	**348**
10x02	15 February 1997	Teddy Sheringham	**Wendy Richard**	Paul Zerdin
10x02	15 February 1997	135	**310**	85
10x03	22 February 1997	**Kevin Day**	Gaynor Faye	Tim Vincent
10x03	22 February 1997	**349**	168	166
10x04	1 March 1997	Garry Bushell	**Malandra Burrows**	Paul Ross
10x04	1 March 1997	292	**401**	295
10x05	8 March 1997	**Sonia Evans**	John Regis	Michelle Collins
10x05	8 March 1997	**318**	314	163
10x06	15 March 1997	John Parrott	**Carol Smillie**	Duncan Norvelle
10x06	15 March 1997	133	**157**	0
10x07	22 March 1997	**Anthony McPartlin**	Declan Donnelly	Davina McCall
10x07	22 March 1997	**288**	227	207
10x08	29 March 1997	Ainsley Harriott	**Kim Williams**	Trevor Brooking
10x08	29 March 1997	256	**380**	266
10x09	5 April 1997	Rowland Rivron	Dale Winton	**Clare Buckfield**
10x09	5 April 1997	119	188	**326**
10x10	12 April 1997	James Crossley	**Andrea Boardman**	Ian Walker
10x10	12 April 1997	279	**354**	352

=== Revival ===
==== Series 1 (2024) ====
Episode	First broadcast	Celebrities				Winner
01x01	7 December 2024	Rob Beckett	Alison Hammond	**Harry Redknapp**	Rosie Ramsey	Will
01x01	7 December 2024	395	232	**411**	339	Will
01x02	22 December 2024	Rob Beckett	Mary Earps	Judi Love	**Olly Murs**	Elliott
01x02	22 December 2024	240	255	329	**371**	Elliott

==== Series 2 (2025) ====
This series was broadcast as You Bet! on Tour and was presented solely by Stephen Mulhern.

Episode	First broadcast	Celebrities		
02x01	30 August 2025	Josh Widdicombe	**Alesha Dixon**	Josie Gibson
02x01	30 August 2025	236	**300**	203
02x02	6 September 2025	Rob Beckett	Zoe Ball	**Eddie Kadi**
02x02	6 September 2025	186	61	**199**
02x03	13 September 2025	Danny Jones	Greg Rutherford	**Oti Mabuse**
02x03	13 September 2025	330	272	**336**
02x04	20 September 2025	**Rylan Clark**	Holly Willoughby	Babatunde Aléshé
02x04	20 September 2025	**224**	188	95
02x05	27 September 2025	Will Best	**Judi Love**	Johnny Vegas
02x05	27 September 2025	135	**184**	149
02x06	4 October 2025	AJ Odudu	Adam & Ryan Thomas	**Alex Brooker**
02x06	4 October 2025	157	98	**221**

==== Christmas Special (2025) ====
First broadcast	Celebrities		
27 December 2025	Rob Beckett	Nick Mohammed	**Alison Hammond**
27 December 2025	184	227	**269**

== Transmissions ==
=== Original series ===
Series	Start date	End date	Episodes
1	20 February 1988	26 March 1988	6
2	28 January 1989	1 April 1989	10
3	17 February 1990	21 April 1990	10
4	16 February 1991	20 April 1991	10
5	6 September 1991	15 November 1991	10
6	4 September 1992	6 November 1992	10
7	10 September 1993	22 October 1993	15
7	12 March 1994	30 April 1994	15
8	25 February 1995	29 April 1995	10
9	1 June 1996	17 August 1996	10
10	8 February 1997	12 April 1997	10

=== Revived series ===
Series	Start date	End date	Episodes
1	7 December 2024	22 December 2024	2
2	30 August 2025	4 October 2025	6

=== Specials ===
Date	Entitle
30 August 1991	Series 4 Compilation
18 July 1992	ITV Telethon Special
26 December 1992	Christmas Special
5 March 1994	Celebrity Special
6 May 1995	5 Minute Recap
27 December 2025	Christmas Special
