= Allan Stewart (comedian) =

Scottish entertainer and pantomime artist (born 1950)

- Born: Allan Stewart; 30 July 1950 (age 75); Glasgow, Lanarkshire, Scotland
- Notable work: Hello, Good evening and welcome (1976–80); Chain Letters (1989)

Comedy career
- Medium: Comedian, actor
- Genres: Comedy, television, singer

Allan Stewart is a Scottish entertainer, known for his appearances in pantomime, who has performed at the Royal Variety Performance.

== Career ==
Stewart's career began in the 1960s when he performed as a cabaret pop singer and musician.

He got his break when he appeared in Hello, Good evening, and welcome, an all-round entertainment show in which a trio of entertainers present gags, impressions, sketches and music.

His next big show, his 1979 STV series, The Allan Stewart Tapes, were picked up by ITV network and broadcast during spring 1980. This resulted in Thames giving Stewart his own show in 1980, followed by a full series by Scottish Television.

In 1984 he appeared in Go For It alongside other impressionists, including Les Dennis and Bobby Davro, doing impressions of everyone from Esther Rantzen to Sergeant Bilko. He appeared with Davro again in 1985's Copy Cats, which featured an array of impressionists.

Stewart then appeared in Live From Her Majesty's, however the night, 15 April 1984, will always be remembered for Tommy Cooper's fatal onstage heart attack. Stewart hosted The Comedy Crowd in 1988, a one-off barrage of skits and impressions for Easter. In 1989 he became host of Chain Letters which was partly broadcast during peak time.

In 1990 Stewart hosted eight half-hours of comedy taped at the Stakis Tree Tops Hotel in Aberdeen. Patter Merchants was screened in the early hours of the morning and featured a host of unknown faces making their television debuts.

In the 1980s and early 1990s, Stewart presented some radio shows as a relief presenter on Clyde 1 and Clyde 2 from Radio Clyde in Glasgow.

Stewart has performed in two televised Royal Variety Shows. He appeared as the lead of a new version of Jolson & Co on a national tour from February to May 2009. Stewart had previously taken over from Brian Conley in the title role of Jolson: The Musical at the Victoria Palace Theatre in the West End for the summer of 1996 while Conley was on holiday.

He is known for his appearances in pantomime at the King's Theatre, Edinburgh alongside Grant Stott and Andy Gray, where he also writes the script. In 2019 he released a book, Dear Aunty May, based around his comedy character, Aunty May. He also presents an annual Big, Big, Variety Show! at the Kings, usually featuring his panto co-stars. The trio have also starred in a play, Canned Laughter. In 2021, he was supposed to be playing the role of Mother Superior in the musical Sister Act but it was postponed as a result of the COVID-19 pandemic.

In 2024, he is appearing in the UK tour and West End revival of Andrew Lloyd Webber's The Wizard of Oz as the Wizard and Professor Marvel.

== Personal life ==
His son, David Stewart is a songwriter known for his work with the band, BTS while his daughter Kate is a singer.

== Filmography ==
=== Television ===
- Sunday Night at the London Palladium (1974)
- Looks who talking (1974/1977/1978 3 episodes ITV Border )
- Hello, Good (Afternoon)/(evening) and welcome (1976–1980) Scottish Television)
- The Allan Stewart Tapes 5 episodes. December 1979 on Scottish Television. 29 April – 27 May 1980 on the ITV network.
- The Allan Stewart show (1980 Thames Television)
- The Allan Stewart show (1982 Scottish television)
- Live From Her Majesty's
- Go For It (1984 London Weekend Television)
- Copy Cats (1985 – 1987 London Weekend Television)
- Summer Time Special
- The Comedy Crowd (1988 Thames Television)
- Chain Letters (1989 Tyne Tees Television)
- Patter Merchants (1990 Grampian Television)
- Scottish Television Hogmanay show (1980's & 1990s)

Preceded by Andrew O'Connor	Host of Chain Letters; 1989–1990	Succeeded by Ted Robbins
