= The Alternative DJ =

BBC radio programme

- Original release: July 1995 – August 1995

The Alternative DJ is a radio programme that aired from July 1995 to August 1995. There were four half-hour episodes and it was broadcast on BBC Radio 2. It starred Peter Jeffrey, Judi Spiers, and Oliver Senton.
