= The Allan Stewart Tapes =

1979 Scottish television comedy series

The Allan Stewart Tapes is a television comedy series which aired on 1979 on Scottish Television. It starred Allan Stewart, alongside Jack Douglas who played his butler living in a penthouse flat overlooking Edinburgh Castle.

According to the Lost UK TV Shows website, the programme is missing, believed wiped, making it a very late example of wiping. In 2026 Kaleidoscope were able to return the first half of episode 1 to the STV archive. It was recovered from a personal recording of a repeat on Thames Television.

== Transmissions ==
Scottish Television broadcast the series over December 1979, at 19.30

- Episode 1–1 December
- Episode 2–8 December
- Episode 3–15 December
- Episode 4–22 December
- Episode 5–29 December

The rest of the ITV network broadcast the series every Tuesday at 3.45 from 29 April until 27 May 1980.
