= Who Do You Do? =

British TV comedy series (1972–1976)

- Also known as: Now Who Do You Do? (1976 series)
- Created by: Jon Scoffield
- Starring: Faith Brown; Peter Goodwright; Freddie Starr
- Country of origin: United Kingdom
- No. of series: 5
- No. of episodes: 52

Production
- Running time: 30 mins
- Production company: London Weekend Television

Original release
- Network: ITV
- Release: 8 January 1972 – 23 May 1976

Who Do You Do? is a British television comedy impressions sketch programme produced by London Weekend Television for ITV from 1972 to 1976. Many notable impressionists/comedians appeared on the show. The format was quickfire, with many items lasting only 30 seconds. It was revived in 1985 as Copy Cats. Writers of the show included Barry Cryer and Dick Vosburgh. The latter was also script editor.

== Featured performers ==
- Russ Abbot
- Debbie Arnold
- Tony Brandon
- Faith Brown
- Janet Brown
- Michael Barrymore
- David Copperfield
- Barry Cryer
- Les Dennis
- Dustin Gee
- Peter Goodwright
- Aiden J. Harvey
- Vince Hill
- Billy Howard
- David Jacobs
- Karen Kay
- Roger Kitter
- Eddie Large
- Syd Little
- Paul Melba
- Johnny More
- Arthur Mullard
- Lance Percival
- The Rockin' Berries
- Freddie Starr
- Joan Turner
