= Billy Howard (comedian) =

English comedian

- Born: 1942 (age 83–84); Edgware, London, England
- Occupations: Comedian, impersonator
- Instruments: Vocals, trumpet, guitar

Billy Howard (born 1942) is an English comedian and impressionist, who appeared on the ITV series Who Do You Do? in the early 1970s, alongside other impressionists such as Faith Brown.

== Career ==
In 1976, his single "King of the Cops", a comic version of the hit "King of the Road", reached No. 6 in the UK Singles Chart; it featured his impressions of TV cops including Kojak, Columbo, Steve McGarrett in Hawaii Five-O, McCloud, Ironside and Cannon. Several months later, a follow-up, "The Disco Cops", was also released, but did not chart. Another comic record by Howard, "Frantic Frog (Parts 1 and 2)", was released in 1977 and also failed to chart. In 1979, he started doing voice over work for television and radio commercials.

== Personal life ==
Howard was born in Edgware, London, England. He commenced his musical career as a jazz trumpeter and guitarist, playing in jazz combos in the early 1960s. He played in many jazz bands in the early 1960s such as Gerry Brown's Jazzmen, Alvin Roy Band.

In 1971 he met Scottish singer Eileen Cameron. They worked with each other and sang together in clubs, eventually getting married in 1975 and welcoming a daughter in 1980.

== Discography ==
=== Singles ===
- "King of the Cops" / "Bond Is A Four Letter Word" (released 12 September 1975, Penny Farthing Records)
- "The Disco Cops" / "I Call My Baby Buggsy" (released 23 April 1976, Penny Farthing Records)
- "Frantic Frog" / "Frantic Frog (Part 2)" (released 4 June 1977, Penny Farthing Records)
- "Truckin' With Santa" / "The "OO" Song" (released 1982, The Hat Factory)

=== King of the Cops chart performance ===
Chart (1976)	Peak position
Australian (Kent Music Report)	24
UK Singles (OCC)	6
