= Ellie Laine =

British comedian

- Occupation: Comedian
- Years active: 1980s-1990s
- Known for: Sexually explicit stand-up comedy in the 1980s; appearances on British panel shows
- Notable work: Blankety Blank, Celebrity Squares, A Question of Entertainment

Ellie Laine is a comedian best known for her sexually explicit stand-up comedy and her appearances on panel shows in the 1980s.

In the 1980s, Laine performed sexually explicit stand-up comedy in working men's clubs while wearing suggestive clothing, discussing sex in graphic and earthy detail.

== Filmography ==
- Blankety Blank (three episodes, 1987-1990)
- A Question of Entertainment (one episode, 1988)
- One Day (1989)
- The Word (one episode, 1991)
- There's Something About A Convent Girl (1991)
- Jumble (one episode, 1991)
- Celebrity Squares (two episodes, 1993)
