= Johnny More =

British impressionist and entertainer (1934–2015)

Johnny More (14 February 1934 – 8 December 2015) was an English comedy impressionist. He is perhaps best remembered as a star of the ITV impressions show Who Do You Do? and its 1980s successor Copy Cats on which he was known for his impressions of Frank Sinatra. More was a member of the Grand Order of Water Rats.

More was born in Hulme, Manchester and began his career in entertainment as a singer after winning talent contests. He also made appearances on Blankety Blank, Punchlines and The New Statesman (1987) in which he portrayed Labour Party leader Neil Kinnock. His impersonations also included film stars; Michael Caine, Sean Connery, Jack Nicholson, Arnold Schwarzenegger and Sylvester Stallone and he did impressions of Tony Blair and President George H. W. Bush. He died aged 81 in Salford Royal Hospital from Leukaemia.
