= Copy Cats (TV series) =

British TV comedy impressions show (1985–1987)

- Starring: Bobby Davro; Aiden J. Harvey; Jessica Martin; Johnny More; Andrew O'Connor; Allan Stewart; Gary Wilmot
- Country of origin: United Kingdom
- Original language: English
- No. of series: 3
- No. of episodes: 20

Production
- Running time: 30 mins
- Production company: LWT

Original release
- Network: ITV
- Release: 30 November 1985 – 5 December 1987

Copy Cats is a British television comedy impressions sketch programme produced by LWT for ITV from 30 November 1985 to 5 December 1987. It was a revival of the quickfire sketch format of 1970s show Who Do You Do? and featured Aiden J. Harvey and Johnny More who were stars of the earlier show.

The concept was first incarnated as "Go For It" in 1984, with the series being repackaged as Copy Cats in 1985.

== Featured performers ==
=== Go For It (1984) ===
- Les Dennis
- Dustin Gee
- Bobby Davro
- Johnny More
- Aiden J. Harvey (as A J Harvey)
- Allan Stewart
- Ann Byrne
- Russel Lane
- Alasdair MacMillan

=== Series 1 ===
- Bobby Davro
- Aiden J. Harvey (as A J Harvey)
- Jessica Martin
- Andrew O'Connor
- Dave Evans
- Allan Stewart
- Gary Wilmot
- Johnny More

=== Series 2 ===
- Hilary O'Neil
- Bobby Davro
- Aiden J. Harvey
- Cheryl Taylor
- Andrew O'Connor
- Mike Osman
- Allan Stewart

=== Series 3 ===
- Aiden J. Harvey
- Andrew O'Connor
- Mike Osman
- Allan Stewart
- Hilary O'Neil
- Pauline Hannah
- Mark Walker

== Series overview ==
- Go For It: 26 May - 30 June 1984: 6 episodes
- Series 1: 30 November 1985 - 18 January 1986: 8 episodes
- Series 2: 30 August - 4 October 1986 : 6 episodes
- Series 3: 31 October - 5 December 1987: 6 episodes
