= Kevin Woodford =

British celebrity chef and TV personality

- Born: 4 June 1950 (age 76); Douglas, Isle of Man
- Occupations: Television personality; Celebrity chef
- Years active: 1989–present

Kevin Woodford (born 4 June 1950) is a British celebrity chef and television personality.

== Career ==
He originally trained as a chef and then moved into education as a lecturer in professional cookery. After gaining a higher degree in the Management of Organisations, he returned to education as Head of Hotel and Catering Studies at a Granville College in Sheffield.

He was a Senior Examiner for City and Guilds Professional Cookery Examinations, judge at several International Cookery Competitions, and worked as a hotel and restaurant consultant for various national and some international organisations.

Kevin is currently working with Stena Line to develop menus for their 7 Irish Sea passenger ferries, he is also helping train their galley chefs and onboard service managers as part of a package developing sales and improving the customer experience.

== Television presenting and acting career ==
Woodford's TV career mainly consists of him cooking in a studio, or travelling around the world, sometimes cooking on those travel shows too.

His first TV appearance was on This Morning in 1989 for ITV, which was followed by him presenting The Reluctant Cook (1989–1991) for BBC2, and Surprise Chefs (1994–1996) for ITV. He made many more appearances on This Morning over the next 30+ years.

In 1990, he made his first guest appearance on Blankety Blank on the BBC.

In 1993, he appeared in a video with Colin Edwyn advertising the Panasonic System 4 microwave combination oven, titled Panasonic System 4 Make the Most of It. They prepared recipes which could be made in the microwave. It was produced by Rapport Television.

In October and November 1993, he starred in the first two episodes of the 13th series of Food and Drink, cooking a surprise meal for a family in each episode.

He then became a regular chef on the BBC cookery show, Ready Steady Cook from 28 October 1994 onwards, as well as presenting Can't Cook, Won't Cook for which he won a National Television Award for Best Daytime Presenter.

In August 1995, he started working as a co-presenter and reporter on Holiday (1995–2000), including the January 1999 special episode Holiday Down Under, and its various spin-offs. They include:

- The first series of Holidays Out by the BBC, which consisted of just 2 episodes.
- Summer Holiday (1996–1997)
- Holiday: Fasten Your Seatbelt (1996–2000)
- Holiday Snaps (1999–2001)

In October 2000, he appeared on Open House with Gloria Hunniford for Channel 5.

In June 2002, he appeared on the first episode of So You Think You're a Good Driver? on BBC One.

Between January and November 2004, he appeared on 3 episodes of the cooking series Reality Bites on ITV.

Starting in October 2004, he presented and co-produced a 104-part series titled Planet Cook, in which he played "Captain Cook." Roughly half of the episodes were broadcast by CBBC and BBC One between 2004 and 2005, with the rest broadcast on Channel 4 between 2008 and 2010. It was later shown in Australia.

In 2006, he starred in Celebrity Tudor Wedding, and The All Star Talent Show, both of which were by Channel 5.

He has also presented Songs of Praise and the live topical debate magazine show The Heaven and Earth Show.

He also had acting roles in Doctors (Robert Hale). For the BBC's Fasten your Seatbelt' series, he demonstrated his ability as a New York taxi driver, entertainer on board 'Oriana', deck hand on a tall ship, and concierge at the Mandarin Oriental Hotel in Hong Kong.

He presented Big Kevin, Little Kevin for the BBC, has written and published 7 cookery books and is the only chef in Europe to have had his own recipes used on a set of Isle of Man postage stamps and was the recipient of This is Your Life for BBC1. He has also appeared on Lily Savage's Blankety Blank.

Woodford began reporting on consumer show Watchdog in 2015.

Since March 2022, he has been appearing on GB News' Saturday Morning Show with Esther McVey and Philip Davies, and GB News' Breakfast with Stephen and Anne with Anne Diamond and Stephen Dixon on Sundays, where he talks about what's in the newspapers on both shows.

In addition, he also appeared occasionally on Steve Wright in the Afternoon on BBC Radio 2.

== Business ventures ==
Woodford owned a restaurant in Douglas, Isle of Man for several years.

During 2009, he developed a small boutique hotel called Birchfield House in Douglas.

Woodford is also an after-dinner speaker
