= Aiden J. Harvey =

British comedian (born 1952)

- Born: 5 March 1952 (age 74); Manchester, England, UK
- Occupation: comedian
- Years active: 1970s–present

Aiden J Harvey (born 5 March 1952 in Manchester, England) is an English northern comedian and impersonator who got his break on the mid-1970s ATV talent show New Faces. He was subsequently in demand on TV comedy and variety shows throughout the following decade.

He often appeared on the 1970s comedy programme Who Do You Do and its 1980s revival, Copy Cats. Both shows were produced by LWT, and centred on a group of impressionists doing impressions. He made a cameo appearance in a 1988 episode of The Sooty Show entitled 'Down Under'.

Harvey was a guest performer on televised variety shows including ''Live from the Piccadilly'.

In 2005, he was working as a comedian on the cabaret circuit in Mallorca, and also as a cruise ship entertainer.

In 2007, he appeared in the pantomime version of Snow White and the Seven Dwarfs at the Southport Theatre.

In recent years, Aiden has appeared in pantomime at the Princess Theatre, Torquay. In 2015, as Muddles in Snow White and the Seven Dwarfs and in 2016 as Buttons in Cinderella. He changed venue in 2017, still for Cinderella, at The Albert Halls, Bolton but returned to Torquay in 2018, appearing as King Eggbert The Oval in Sleeping Beauty.

== See also ==
- The Summer Show
