= Roz Hanby =

British flight attendant and TV presenter

Rosalind Anne Rosemary Hanby
- Born: 2 October 1951 (age 74)
- Occupations: flight attendant, model, television presenter, nurse
- Known for: face of British Airways in their "Fly the Flag"

Rosalind Anne Rosemary Hanby (born 2 October 1951) is an English former flight attendant notable for being the face of British Airways in their "Fly the Flag" advertising campaign over a seven-year period starting in the mid-1970s through the 1980s. She became a minor celebrity as a result, working as a television presenter before becoming a nurse.

== Early life ==
She was educated at the Lycée Français and became fluent in French and Spanish.

== Career ==
After modelling work, she joined BOAC in 1970 as a flight attendant on VC10 aircraft. In 1975, Hanby was featured in the "Fly the Flag" advertising campaign for British Airways designed by Foote Cone & Belding to showcase a working flight attendant. At the time, Hanby was signed to a 10-year contract with the airline and was not prepared for the fame that would ensue. Because she was constantly being asked for her autograph, BA moved her to Concorde flights, which she recalled as a relief: "[It] was great because everyone was more famous than me." "Fly the Flag" was discontinued in 1982, immediately following the switch from the American advertising agency Foote, Cone and Belding (which had held the account for 36 years) to the British Saatchi & Saatchi.

Following her appearances in British Airways commercials she worked as a television presenter for TVS, before going into nursing. In 2007, she was the school nurse at Leaden Hall School in Wiltshire.

== In popular culture ==
- After a fight, an ambulance attendant crashes through a British Airways billboard featuring Hanby's face with the strapline "We'll take more care of you" in the 1979 James Bond film Moonraker.
