= Safire (illusionists) =

Welsh illusion act

Safire is an illusion act based in North Wales. The act consists of Stuart and Libby Loughland who perform large scale magic and stage illusions mainly in theatres and larger venues in the UK.

Highlights of their career include receiving an invitation from illusionists Siegfried and Roy to appear in their World Magic Show at the Tropicana Hotel in Las Vegas, and also performing at the 20th Century Fox Plaza Hotel in Los Angeles. They have also performed in a Royal Variety Performance at The Prince of Wales Theatre in London's West End, entertained Prince Luitpold of Bavaria and appeared on many cruise ships and theatres.

Safire have appeared with BBC's Chuckle Brothers on 14 UK theatre tour, playing parts, performing a giant UV puppet act, "The Magic Light Puppets” and also presenting their illusions. They also built and constructed illusions, set, special effects and puppets for the later tours.

Safire's TV appearances have included CITV, Sooty, Talk of the Town and The Pyjama Party with Claudia Winkleman. They also have appeared on Granada TV's Christmas Special with Noddy Holder and the cast of Coronation Street, and on three Chuckle Brothers DVDs.
