= Andrew O'Connor (actor) =

British comedian, actor and magician (born 1963)

- Born: 23 March 1963 (age 63); Stevenage, Hertfordshire, England
- Occupations: Actor, comedian, magician, television presenter
- Years active: 1976–present
- Employer: Objective Media Group

Andrew Mark O'Connor (born 23 March 1963) is an English actor, comedian, magician, and television producer.

== Career ==
=== Television ===
Although O'Connor enjoyed a short stint as a child actor, appearing as Tom Brill in the BBC mini-series The Canal Children in 1976, he made his mark as a children's magician, and won the Magic Circle's Young Magician of the Year prize in 1981. After appearing in a number of variety shows on television, he was invited to join the cast of London Weekend Television's Copy Cats, a showcase featuring impressionists such as Bobby Davro and Gary Wilmot, in 1985. A second series, without Wilmot, followed in 1986. O'Connor received a writing credit for each series. His own children's show, Andrew O'Connor's Joke Machine, soon followed, in which he told jokes, and performed magic tricks and invited children to do the same.

In 1986, O'Connor began appearing in ITV's popular Saturday morning children's series No. 73. Shortly afterwards, he switched to the BBC to launch another Saturday morning children's series, On the Waterfront, alongside fellow ex-No. 73 host Kate Copstick. In 1991, O'Connor became the second actor to play The Head in CITV's arts and crafts show Art Attack presented by Neil Buchanan. O'Connor hosted the 30-minute quiz show Second Guess that aired on The Family Channel in 1995.

In 1988, O'Connor also appeared regularly in short comedy sketches co-written by himself for the Observation round in ITV game show The Krypton Factor. In the same year, he took over from Jeremy Beadle as the presenter of the daytime game show Chain Letters. He returned to acting to play the role of the computer in early 1990s children's sci-fi show Kappatoo but it was his career as a quiz-show host that took off, and he subsequently presented the UK version of Talk About, moved to Saturday night prime time in 1991 with One to Win, and returned to daytime television with The Alphabet Game.

In 1993, O'Connor presented The Big Breakfast for a week while Chris Evans was on holiday, but did not enjoy the experience of live television. The same year, he presented a BBC One game show called Happy Families, alongside Sarah Greene. He presented an ITV & Family Channel game show called Family Catchphrase, which was a spin-off from Catchphrase; there were 100 episodes from 1994. One episode featured a young Simon Amstell and another featured a guest appearance from the show's creator, Stephen Radosh. Also in 1994, O'Connor played the lead in the touring musical Me and My Girl.

O'Connor established Objective Productions with Michael Vine, where O'Connor holds the position of Chair. The company website states the company was founded in 1991 but a 2005 interview with O'Connor in The Independent lists 1996 as the year the company was formed. According to Companies House, Objective was incorporated on 9 April 1992. He has produced comedy and magic-related TV shows, including Peep Show, and most of Derren Brown's programmes.

O'Connor is an advocate of public service broadcasting, and in particular Channel 4, to which he attributes a large part of his success as a producer.

=== Film ===
O'Connor directed the film Magicians starring David Mitchell and Robert Webb released on 18 May 2007.

=== Theatre ===
In 1993, O'Connor played the title role in the musical BILLY at the Edinburgh Festival. He then went on to play the lead role of Bill Snibson in Me and My Girl in 1994 and the title role in the revival of Barnum in 1995 and 1996. He has also directed in theatre with productions of 42nd Street, Anything Goes and The Nerd on tour and The Odd Couple (female version) in the West End. In 2015, O'Connor directed Derren Brown: Miracle with Andy Nyman.

== Awards ==
O'Connor has won two BAFTA awards for The Quick Trick Show and Peep Show, and Magicians won best comedy film at the Miami film festival.

Preceded by Jeremy Beadle	Host of Chain Letters; 1988-1989	Succeeded by Allan Stewart
