= Peter Goodwright =

English comedian (1936–2020)

Peter Goodwright (12 May 1936 – 2 November 2020) was an English comedic impressionist. He appeared on the ITV impressions show Who Do You Do? in the 1970s. Goodwright was born in Haslington, Cheshire.

== Career ==
Goodwright has been referred to as "the godfather of impressionists". On radio in the 1950s, he appeared in The Clitheroe Kid and the last episode of Hancock's Half Hour; where he impersonated Tony Hancock as he specialised in impersonating radio performers. As well as Who Do You Do?, he made several television appearances, including on Jokers Wild. He was a panel member on the BBC Radio 2 comedy game The Impressionists and appeared on the Royal Variety Performance in 1987. He worked with Harry Enfield in the spoof documentary biopic Norbert Smith: A Life in 1989, and also appeared on stage in farces by Ray Cooney.

His death, aged 84, was reported in November 2020.
