= Normski =

British broadcaster, photographer, DJ and rapper (born 1966)

- Born: Norman Anderson; 1966 (age 59–60); Camden, London, England
- Occupations: Broadcaster, photographer, DJ
- Website: http://www.normskiphotography.com/

Norman Anderson (born 1966), better known as Normski, is a British broadcaster, photographer, and DJ.

== Early life ==
Anderson was born in Camden, London. He was given his first camera at the age of nine, and was inspired by photographer Horace Ové, whose son was a friend.

== Career ==
Anderson established himself within London's hip-hop scene in the 1980s, photographing the fashion associated with the scene for magazines including The Face and Vogue. He also became a fashion designer, using patterns associated with black African cultural heritage. Anderson has photographed the likes of Public Enemy, De La Soul, Ice Cube, and Queen Latifah.

Described as "larger than life and effusive", he came into wider public attention as Normski when he fronted BBC television's DEF II and Dance Energy, flagship "youth" shows on BBC2 in the late 1980s and early 1990s. Anderson has also appeared on various TV shows and documentaries.

His photography on the theme of the "Black British experience" has been exhibited at the Victoria and Albert Museum in London.

On the radio, he has appeared on BBC Radio 1, Kiss 100, and with regular shows on Push FM and Flex FM.

His fanzine Darker Shade of White captures images from the 1980s UK hip-hop culture.

In September 2023, he released the book Man With The Golden Shutter, a selection of his photography.

== Publications ==
- Man With The Golden Shutter. UK: ACC Art Books, 2023. ISBN 9781788842341.
