= Anna Walker (television presenter) =

British television presenter

Anna Walker (born 4 December 1962) is a British television presenter who has presented such programmes as Wish You Were Here...?, Big Strong Boys, Holidaymaker, Garden Challenge, Garden Invaders and Tomorrow's World.

== Early life and education ==
Walker was born in Sheffield, West Riding of Yorkshire. She attended the independent Mount School in York, followed by The British School in the Netherlands from 1979 to 1981. She studied zoology at the University of Bristol.

== Career ==
Walker hosted Good Morning Britain for TV-am for a short spell before joining Yorkshire Television. She co-presented Yorkshire Television's Calendar regional news magazine programme until 1989. Walker left Yorkshire Television to front sports output for British Satellite Broadcasting. When British Sky Broadcasting took over the company, many of its staff were made redundant and Walker undertook freelance sports reporting duties for BBC Television nationally, working on several events including the winter and summer Olympics of 1992. She soon moved to British Sky Broadcasting as a sports presenter.

In 2005, she appeared in the third series of the Channel 4 reality television show, The Games, where, as the oldest competitor, she finished 4th with particularly good performances in gymnastics and trampolining and good showings throughout, often just missing out on gold and silver placings by fractions.

== Personal life ==
She married the businessman (Hugh) Will Herrington in September 1995 in Haywards Heath. She has three children. Walker was the maid of honour at the wedding of Catherine Zeta-Jones and Michael Douglas.

Walker is a Sheffield United football fan, and has been a Blade since the age of 10. She was introduced to the team by her father who was a regular at Bramall Lane as were his son and two daughters.
