= Live from... =

- Also known as: Live from Her Majesty's (1983–5); Live from the Piccadilly (1986); Live from the Palladium (1987–8)
- Genre: Entertainment
- Directed by: Alasdair Macmillan, Ian Hamilton
- Presented by: Jimmy Tarbuck
- Country of origin: United Kingdom
- Original language: English
- No. of series: 7
- No. of episodes: 43

Production
- Producers: David Bell, Marcus Plantin, Ian Hamilton
- Production locations: Her Majesty's Theatre (1983–5); Piccadilly Theatre (1986); London Palladium (1987–8)
- Running time: 60 mins
- Production company: LWT

Original release
- Network: ITV
- Release: 16 January 1983 – 27 November 1988

Related
- Sunday Night at the Palladium

Live from Her Majesty's, Live from the Piccadilly and Live from the Palladium were Sunday night live entertainment variety television shows that aired on ITV from 16 January 1983 to 27 November 1988 and were hosted by Jimmy Tarbuck. Each was broadcast live from a theatre in London and followed in the tradition of earlier variety spectacles such as Sunday Night at the Palladium.

== Death of Tommy Cooper ==
During the second series of Live from Her Majesty's on 15 April 1984, comedian Tommy Cooper collapsed and died after suffering a massive heart attack. Cooper collapsed against the curtain, and most members of the audience were laughing, assuming that it was a joke Cooper was playing. It was not until compere Jimmy Tarbuck realised that the drop was not part of Cooper's routine, that the production crew suddenly realised what had occurred.

The show continued after an earlier than planned commercial break and after Tarbuck was reportedly informed Cooper was recovering. Backstage, while the show continued with Les Dennis & Dustin Gee's performance, paramedics frantically attempted to revive Cooper, but he was pronounced dead on arrival at Westminster Hospital. His death was not officially reported until the next morning, although the incident led the ITN News bulletin which followed the show.

== Transmissions ==
Series	Start date	End date	Episodes	Location
1	16 January 1983	27 February 1983	7	Her Majesty's Theatre
2	11 March 1984	29 April 1984	7	Her Majesty's Theatre
3	6 October 1985	10 November 1985	6	Her Majesty's Theatre
4	28 September 1986	2 November 1986	6	Piccadilly Theatre
5	5 April 1987	10 May 1987	6	London Palladium
6	11 October 1987	15 November 1987	6	London Palladium
7	9 October 1988	27 November 1988	5	London Palladium
