= Billy Pearce =

British comedian

- Born: 1 February 1951 (age 75)

Comedy career
- Years active: 1974–present
- Medium: Stand-up
- Genres: Rapid-fire gags and jokes
- Website: Official website

Billy Pearce (born 1 February 1951) is an English performer, comedian, actor and entertainer, who appeared regularly on UK television in the 1980s and 1990s, in which Pearce has been described as a "supreme entertainer". He particularly loves performing at the Alhambra Theatre in Bradford, where he consistently breaks box office records.

== Early life ==
Pearce was born in Leeds in 1951. His father was a pianist and his mother Jean was a respected dance teacher, notably teaching a young Malandra Burrows to perform. He took up ballet as a child, developing a penchant for performing after appearing in amateur productions for Leeds Thespians and operatic companies. Despite this, Pearce had aspirations to be an engineer originally. This changed after he had a serious motorbike accident, which altered his outlook on life. He has explained, "From then on I couldn't settle and I did lots of different jobs. I'd never been out of Leeds and the surgeon who operated on me let me stay at his place on an island in the Adriatic. I was the only British person on the island. All those things changed my life and I couldn't settle after that. I certainly couldn't go back to working in an engineering factory day after day [...] I didn't know what I wanted to do. I just drifted." He moved to Iceland for a period, worked on fish docks, was a dresser for Yorkshire Television and a stage hand at Leeds Grand. Pearce, who had always loved entertaining people, then found employment as a redcoat for the British holiday camp Butlins in 1970, with a friend who had attended his mother's dancing school; together they formed a musical double act, known as the Stewart Brothers. Stanley Joseph of Leeds City Varieties was impressed by the act and got them a booking playing alternate nights at a cabaret club in Barnsley and the Fiesta club in Sheffield. Pearce then went solo and set his sights on becoming a club-filler.

== Career in showbusiness ==
Pearce began his career in mainstream showbusiness as a "variety entertainer". He first rose to prominence when he appeared in the televised talent show New Faces in 1986, where he reached the final. Due to his success on the show, Pearce began to appear more regularly on stage and television throughout the 1980s and 1990s. He worked with Danny La Rue and was the compere for comedy double act Cannon and Ball. He has also starred in his own show entitled The Billy Pearce Laughter Show at Blackpool's Grand Theatre and at Bournemouth's BIC. In 1989, Pearce fronted his own BBC television series, You Gotta Be Joking, and he appeared regularly as a guest on numerous game shows, entertainment and chat shows. He appeared at the 1991 Royal Variety Performance and the 1993 Children's Royal Variety Performance which he played the role of Billy Jones, brother of famous archaeologist Indiana Jones. As of 2008, Pearce has performed in five children's Royal Variety shows and three Royal Variety shows in total. Successful in the variety entertainment genre, in 1994 he won the British Comedy Award for "Top Theatre Variety Performer", beating popular personalities of the time, such as Ken Dodd and Michael Barrymore. That same year, he also received the Sir James Carreras Award for "Outstanding New Talent". Prior to this, he was voted Club Mirror's solo comedian of the year by fellow professionals in 1988, and followed this with best television comedy newcomer at the London Palladium.

He has been a regular on stage, performing a summer season with acts such as Tommy Trinder at the Spa Pavilion, Felixstowe, and topping the bill at the Grand Theatre, Blackpool in 1993. He completed two summer seasons at the Grand Theatre Blackpool in 2000 and 2001, originally with John Inman and then with Joe Longthorne and Keith Harris, starred at the Pavilion Theatre, Weymouth in 1994, and at the Futurist Theatre, Scarborough, in 1995. He has also headlined in numerous pantomimes, topping the bill and breaking successive box office records at the Alhambra Theatre, Bradford in Aladdin (1994–1995), as Buttons in Cinderella (1997), alongside Amanda Barrie in Snow White (2002–2003), and in Jack and the Beanstalk at the Hull New Theatre (2001–2002). From 2003–2004, he appeared once again at Bradford Alhambra in the highest grossing pantomime in its history.

Pearce has acted on television in shows such as ITV's Heartbeat in 2001, and in 2004 he turned to musical theatre, appearing in Boogie Nights as Roddie O'Neil at Blackpool's Grand Theatre. At the time he commented, "A musical is something I've always wanted to do but people said: ‘No, you're a comic, that's what you do. They said the same thing when I was wanting to try pantomime: ‘You're a club comic.' I just want the opportunity to show people what I can do." He went on to star in the musical, the Rocky Horror Show in 2007 as the guest narrator.

2008 saw Billy performing at Bridlington Spa Theatre, Blackpool Tower and Skegness Embassy Theatre in 'Billy Pearce's Big Night Out' along with Neil Hurst, Linda Newport and Safire (illusionists).

In 2009, Billy toured theatres in the UK in Comedy Night Out Tour with Jimmy Cricket and Mick Miller and also starred in The Billy Pearce Laughter Show at the North Pier Blackpool which broke box office records and was voted the best show in Blackpool 2009.

In September 2010, appeared in Morley Amateur Operatic Society's production of "Return to the Forbidden Planet" as the newsreader.

2010 saw Billy return to the North Pier alongside Guy Barrett, son of well-known Norman Barrett, Neil Hurst and Leanne Fury.

In 2011, Billy moved his Laughter show from North Pier to the Grand Theatre, Blackpool bringing Neil Hurst with him and Emma Gilmour. During this season, Billy Pearce celebrated his 1000th performance on stage at the Grand Theatre, Blackpool.

In 2016, he appeared in Peter Pan at the Alhambra Theatre. It was his 18th pantomime in Bradford.

== Catchphrase ==
In many of Billy Pearce's Summer shows and pantomimes, he uses the catchphrase "Hiya kids" to much comic effect. He often uses a silly accent or voice to heighten this effect. He famously uses the word 'Chuffin' in tandem with 'Chafing'. On TV and his stand-up shows he often used 'I will tell you when!' (To imply the audience had started laughing too early to an extended joke).

== Charity work ==
On 25 February 2012, Pearce became the second patron of Yorkshire Children's Trust, a Yorkshire charity offering grants to families with sick or disabled children.

On 1 March 2014, Pearce attended the 3rd Birthday of Yorkshire Children's Trust. He talked with families the charities had helped, posed for photographs and cut the official charity birthday cake in front of the media. The charity will also be providing a disabled play area in Halifax which will include the Billy Pearce Community Room.

In April 2021, Pearce became the first Patron for local community charity, WF3 Kindness who work across the South Leeds and North Kirklees area. Pearce, who lives local to the charity supported the organisation since their incorporation in 2020 and said at the time “I feel incredibly proud to have been asked. "WF3 Kindness do wonderful things for so many in the local area and I'm excited to be involved and look forward to working with them in the future".
