= Suzanne Dando =

British former Olympic gymnast (born 1961)

Suzanne Jane Dando
- Born: 3 July 1961 (age 65) Balham, London

Gymnastics career
- Country represented: Great Britain
- Gym: Ladywell Gymnastics Club
- Retired: 1980

Suzanne Jane Dando, BEM (born 3 July 1961) is a British former Olympic gymnast who competed at the 1979 World Gymnastics Championship in Fort Worth, Dallas, and the 1980 Summer Olympics in Moscow. Since her retirement, she has worked as a television broadcaster for channels including BBC1, BBC2, Channel 4 and Sky Sports. She serves as a patron and trustee of a number of charities.

== Early life ==
Suzanne Dando was born in Balham, London, and spent her early years in Merstham, Surrey. Her parents later moved to Uckfield, Sussex, where she resided for the rest of her childhood. She studied at Uckfield Comprehensive and Catford Girls' School, London.

== British and Olympic gymnast ==
Her gymnastics talent was first recognised at age 11 by a school physical education teacher. She passed all the BAGA awards and climbed onto the uneven bars for the first time when she was 12. In 1975 she left her family home in Sussex and moved to London to further her gymnastics career. She first represented her country at international level in 1976, aged 15, when she competed for Britain against West Germany.

In 1977, after winning many national titles, she was awarded a Sir Winston Churchill Scholarship Churchill Fellowship, allowing her to spend time training in the US in 1978. She returned to the US in early 1979, returning home in time to compete in the British Championships. However, she sustained an injury and could not compete, which ruled her out of the squad for the 1979 European Championships. On recovery, she went on to represent her country in the 1979 World Championships at Fort Worth, Dallas, USA, gaining her F.I.G. Gold Pin.

In 1980, Dando won the Champion of Champions title at the Royal Albert Hall. In May she became the overall British National Champion.

=== Retirement ===
Dando retired after the Olympics, explaining that the direction the sport was taking concerned her, as serious injuries, like Yelena Mukhina's, were increasing. Dando later revealed to the UK press she had suffered anorexia whilst a gymnast.

== After gymnastics ==
Following her retirement, Dando coached under-fives in gymnastics at Lewisham Leisure Centre in South London. She wrote a book, Fun Ways to Looking Good, and produced and presented her own fitness video, Flexercise.

In 1983, Dando was gymnastics supervisor for the Bond film Octopussy. The following year her fitness album Shape Up and Dance with Suzanne Dando peaked at No. 87 in the UK Albums Chart.

Dando has worked as a TV presenter on a variety of shows for the BBC, ITV and Channel Four. She also worked as a model, actress and singer. In 1987, Dando was a guest on David Frost's TV panel show Through the Keyhole.

Her TV career started with the BBC, presenting the children's programme Stopwatch with Daley Thompson and Janice Long. Dando joined Sky Sports in 1993, mainly on live sports programmes, with occasional appearances on the BBC for national and international gymnastics events. She presented the BBC2 art programme Awash with Colour and BBC's The Pet Set. She co-presented Horse of the Year Show in 2009.

== Charitable activity ==
Dando has been an ambassador of The Prince's Trust since 1999 and a patron for Against Breast Cancer since the early 1990s. She has taken part in many of their fundraising events, such as launching the Oxford Bike Ride and more recently the charity's first Breast Walk Ever, a marathon walk throughout Oxfordshire.

A former Honorary Vice-President of The Children's Trust, she raised over £18,000 running the London Marathon in 2008 alongside her husband Adam Reynolds and the Children's Trust former patient, Alfie Russell. In 2011, she teamed up with Russell again when they successfully summited Mount Kilimanjaro, raising another £11,000 for charity.

A passionate supporter of Britain's Armed Forces, Dando coordinated The Remembrance Expedition in support of the Royal British Legion in 2010. Following an old wartime escape route, she led a team of women past and present from the Royal Navy, RAF and Army across the Pyrenees, raising £38,000 for the charities' proposed Battle Back Centres.

A former trustee of The Baton charity, founded by Alan Rowe, Dando ran the Baton Relay in 2013, a 110-mile team run from RAF Brize Norton through the night to the National Memorial Arboretum (NMA) in Staffordshire.

Dando is a lifelong animal lover and has rescued a number of dogs, cats and horses. She currently supports the Dogs Trust and Blue Cross (by sponsoring dogs), as well as her local branch of Riding for the Disabled Association and the World Horse Welfare.

In the 2015 New Year Honours, Dando was awarded a British Empire Medal (BEM) for services to charity.

== Personal life ==
In July 1987, Dando married Graham Maclean, a composer and songwriter, in Westminster. The couple later divorced. In September 1996, Dando married the Australian actor Bruce Roberts, whom she met when they both appeared in the pantomime Sleeping Beauty. Roberts returned to Australia alone in late 1998 having become homesick. Dando remained in the UK, but spent Christmas with Roberts. They confirmed their separation to a reporter for Hello!, but hoped their relationship could survive. It did not and the couple divorced in February 2000. Dando is married to businessman Adam Reynolds and lives in Oxfordshire.
