= Caron Keating =

British television presenter (1962–2004)

- Keating pictured around 1988
- Born: 5 October 1962; Fulham, London, England
- Died: 13 April 2004 (aged 41); Sevenoaks, Kent, England
- Occupation: Television presenter
- Known for: Blue Peter presenter
- Spouse: Russ Lindsay (m. 1991)
- Children: 2
- Mother: Gloria Hunniford
- Website: caronkeating.org

Caron Louisa Keating (5 October 1962 – 13 April 2004) was a British television presenter.

== Early life and education ==
Keating was born on 5 October 1962 in Fulham, south-west London, to an English father with Irish roots and a Northern Irish mother. When she was three months old her family relocated to Northern Ireland where she was raised. Her parents were the television presenter Gloria Hunniford and the BBC producer Donald Keating (d. 1997). Keating attended Harmony Hill Primary School, Lisburn and Methodist College, Belfast, where she gained 8 'O' levels and 3 'A' levels. She was accepted to study at the University of Bristol where she graduated three years later aged 21 with a BA Honours Degree in English and Drama.

== Broadcasting career ==
Keating's television career began in Northern Ireland where she presented The Video Picture Show, Channel One and the music programme Greenrock, but her big break came when she was selected to join the team of Blue Peter from 13 November 1986.

Keating appeared on the programme with Peter Duncan, Janet Ellis, Mark Curry, Yvette Fielding, and John Leslie. Her Blue Peter career included a trip to Moscow in 1987 during the perestroika period, swimming with sharks, abseiling down skyscrapers and standing strapped to the top of a light aircraft whilst it performed aerial acrobatics. She also interviewed serving prime minister Margaret Thatcher on the programme in 1988.

After four years, Keating left Blue Peter on 22 January 1990. Keating joined BBC Radio 5 where amongst other programmes she co-hosted an early 90s afternoon show with film critic Mark Kermode titled A Game of Two Halves. In his autobiography, Kermode described Keating as "The very dictionary definition of Lovely". She presented several other TV programmes including This Morning, before breast cancer was diagnosed in 1997. Keating was the face of Sainsbury's Reward Card from 1996 to 1997, before Edita Brychta took over towards the end of 1997, and also appeared in a TV commercial for So Good soya drink in 1999. In 1999 she co-presented the consumer affairs programme We Can Work It Out on ITV with Judy Finnigan and Jenni Falconer.

== Personal life, illness and death ==
Keating married Russ Lindsay in Tunbridge Wells, Kent in 1991. Their two sons were born in Hammersmith, London. The family settled in Fowey, Cornwall for a few years at the turn of the century.

Keating was diagnosed with breast cancer in 1997. After undergoing conventional and alternative treatments, and spending a period away from her family on the Gold Coast, Australia, and under hospice care in Switzerland, she died at the age of 41, on 13 April 2004, at her mother's house in Sevenoaks, Kent.

== The Caron Keating Foundation ==
Set up in Keating's memory, The Caron Keating Foundation is a fund-raising partnership set up to raise money to offer financial support to professional carers, complementary healing practitioners, and support groups dealing with cancer patients, as well as individuals and families who are affected by the disease. It will also financially help a number of cancer charities with their ongoing quest for prevention, early detection and hopefully an ultimate cure. It was set up by her mother, TV presenter Gloria Hunniford, and her two brothers Michael and Paul Keating.

== See also ==
- List of Blue Peter presenters
