= Judi Spiers =

British radio and television presenter (born 1953)

- Born: Judith Marilyn Spiers; 15 March 1953 (age 73); Plymouth, Devon, England, UK
- Education: Rose Bruford College
- Occupations: Television and radio presenter
- Years active: 1977–present
- Television: Pebble Mill
- Spouse: Richard Hacker
- Website: Official website

Judith Marilyn Spiers (born 15 March 1953) is a British radio and television presenter. She is currently a presenter on Boom Radio.

== Career ==
Spiers was born in Plymouth, Devon. Initially training to be an actress at the Rose Bruford College, Spiers began her broadcasting career at Westward Television in 1977, then the ITV station for south-west England. She later moved to the What's Ahead entertainment guide. Spiers hosted local beauty contests Mr TSW and Miss TSW for TSW, which had replaced Westward as the ITV contractor for the south-west.

At the start of the 1990s, Spiers moved to national television as a presenter on BBC One's daily magazine programme Pebble Mill from October 1991 to August 1994. In 1995 she co-hosted The Alternative DJ with Peter Jeffrey and Oliver Senton. She also hosted a Saturday show on BBC Radio 2 between 1994 and 1998.

Spiers presented the morning show on BBC Radio Devon from 2005 to 2015. Since August 2021 Spiers has been a presenter on Boom Radio. She currently presents shows on the station on Fridays and Saturdays from 2 pm to 4 pm.
