= Bobby Davro =

British comedian (born 1958)

- Born: Robert Christopher Nankeville; 13 September 1958 (age 68); Ashford, Middlesex, England
- Notable work: Comedian, actor, impressionist, host
- Spouse: Trudi Jameson (m. 1993; sep. 2003)
- Children: 3

Comedy career
- Years active: 1981–present
- Genre: Stand-up

Robert Christopher Nankeville, known professionally as Bobby Davro (born 13 September 1958), is an English actor, comedian and impressionist.

He made his television breakthrough on Live from Her Majesty's in 1983, after which he joined the cast of sketch comedy show Copy Cats then starred in his own sketch comedy shows from the mid 1980s to early 1990s: Bobby Davro on the Box (1985), Bobby Davro's TV Annual (1986), Bobby Davro's TV Weekly (1987), Bobby In Wonderland (1988), Davro's Sketch Pad (1989), and Davro (1990). He hosted 65 episodes of Winner Takes All in 1997.

He played Vinnie Monks in 68 episodes of EastEnders (2007–2008). He participated in Come Dine with Me (2009), Dancing on Ice (2010), Your Face Sounds Familiar (2013), and Celebrity Big Brother (2015).

== Career ==
Davro appeared on a variety of television shows, mostly with ITV, throughout the 1980s. He made his television breakthrough on Live from Her Majesty's in 1983. He appeared in the first two series of popular comedy impressions sketch show Copy Cats, as well as his own Saturday night shows, Bobby Davro on the Box (1985), Bobby Davro's TV Annual (1986), Bobby Davro's TV Weekly (1987), Bobby In Wonderland (1988), Davro's Sketch Pad (1989), and Davro (1990).

1992 saw Davro switching to BBC, hosted in Public Enemy Number One (1992), and suffered whiplash for several weeks after poor health and safety resulted in a pillory incident. in 1993, he used his usual comedy sketch-show format that had proved so successful for him in the 1980s in Bobby Davro: Rock with Laughter (1993), but was his last show for some time. He replaced John Eccleston as co-presenter on the game show Run the Risk with Peter Simon: this featured on the BBC's Saturday morning children's show Live & Kicking. Davro returned to UK TV screens in May 1997 as host for 65 episodes of Yorkshire Television's Winner Takes All.

In 2015 Davro appeared at the King's Head Theatre, Islington as ping-pong-playing London cab driver Eric in a revival of Simon Block's comedy Not a Game for Boys. The play was directed by Jason Lawson. The production was well-received, with Danny Coleman-Cooke of the British Theatre website with much praise for his performance.

In December 2015, Davro announced a 20-date UK tour for the following year, starting at the Epsom Playhouse on 17 May 2016. On 6 February 2015, he was a guest of Graham Norton on his weekly BBC Radio 2 show.

=== Live performances ===
- In 2005 and 2006, he performed on stage in Aladdin with Melinda Messenger and John Rhys Davies in Woking, Surrey.
- In 2011, he performed at the Derngate Theatre, Northampton, in Aladdin.
- In 2012, he returned to the Derngate Theatre in a production of Cinderella alongside Denise Welch.
- In February 2016, Davro appeared in a free gig at The Railway Inn, Billingshurst, as headline on their monthly Joke Club night.
- In 2017, he appeared at the Southend Cliffs Pavilion as Silly Billy in Jack and the Beanstalk.
- In 2018, he starred in Dick Whittington at the Mayflower Theatre, Southampton.
- In 2025, he toured the south of England with his new show Everything is Funny if You Can Laugh at it (2025).

=== EastEnders ===
In August 2007, Davro joined the cast of the BBC One soap opera EastEnders, playing Vinnie Monks, a love interest for Shirley Carter. The character first appeared on screen in October. He left in autumn 2008, later stating his character "wasn't very good and they didn't give me proper storylines".

=== Guest appearances ===
In 1987, Bobby Davro appeared in an episode of Rainbow titled "Guess Who I Am", in which he did impressions of Bungle, Zippy, George and Geoffrey.

On 20 September 2009, he appeared in a new series of the Channel 4 programme Come Dine with Me, appearing with EastEnders actress Laila Morse, DJ Dane Bowers and presenter Dani Behr; Davro attained second place.

=== Dancing on Ice ===
Davro took part in the ITV skating show Dancing on Ice in January 2010, and was paired with newcomer Molly Moenkhoff. He began the show as a 66/1 outsider to be the outright winner, and made his first and only competitive appearance along with the other male celebrities in week 2, but after a poor performance, was the first male celebrity to be eliminated, after a dance-off with actor Gary Lucy.

=== Your Face Sounds Familiar ===
In 2013, Davro along with other celebrities took part in the ITV entertainment series Your Face Sounds Familiar. He was eliminated in the fifth week. His chosen charity for the series was Kids 'n' Cancer.

Week	Portraying	Song	Judges' scores					Result
Week	Portraying	Song	Julian Clary	Emma Bunton	Guest Judge	Bonus points	Total	Result
1	Sir Tom Jones	"Sex Bomb"	8	7	9	0	24	Not in Top 3
2	Sir Mick Jagger	"(I Can't Get No) Satisfaction"	9	10	10	10	39	Runner-up
3	Ozzy Osbourne	"Paranoid"	9	9	9	0	27	Not in Top 3
4	Tammy Wynette	"Stand by Your Man"	7	6	7	5	25	Not in Top 3
5	Sir Paul McCartney	"I Want to Hold Your Hand"	8	8	7	5	28	Eliminated

=== Celebrity Big Brother ===
After dismissing reality shows including Big Brother, Britain's Got Talent and I'm a Celebrity and saying he would never appear on such series, in 2015 Davro entered the Celebrity Big Brother house to take part in the sixteenth series. On 24 September, he reached the final and was placed 4th.

== Personal life ==
=== Family and relationships ===
Davro was born, on 13 September 1958, in Ashford, Middlesex, England. His father, Bill Nankeville, was a runner; a British national mile and 1500m champion, world-record holder, and represented Great Britain in two Olympic Games. His brother was a professional golfer.

Trudi Jameson, the mother of Davro's three children, is from Sutton Coldfield. The couple parted in 2003.

Between 2007 and 2011 Davro dated Vicky Wright, daughter of Wolverhampton Wanderers and England footballer Billy Wright. They later reunited and were engaged to be married until Wright's death in May 2023.

Davro is a keen angler.

=== Health ===
In 1992, whilst appearing as host in the BBC's Public Enemy Number One (1992), he suffered whiplash for several weeks after being placed in a pillory, which had not been secured vertically, and toppled over projecting him face-first onto the studio's concrete floor. Reflecting on the incident, Davro said, "the doctors were amazed I hadn’t suffered more badly. I didn’t break my nose or any teeth, which was a minor miracle". This incident was not televised but was used in a BBC safety video, and Inside No.9's Halloween special of 2018, "Dead Line".

On January 18 2024, at age 65, Davro collapsed following a stint on stage, at the Comedy club in Coulsdon. He had suffered a minor stroke and had to cancel all future appearances for a short time.

=== Charity ===
Davro has been a supporter of the UK charity Kids 'n' Cancer.
