= Steal (game show) =

- Genre: Game show
- Created by: Ian Messiter; James Beaumont
- Presented by: Mark Walker
- Voices of: Stephen Rhodes
- Country of origin: United Kingdom
- Original language: English
- No. of series: 1
- No. of episodes: 12

Production
- Running time: 30 minutes (inc. adverts)
- Production company: Central

Original release
- Network: ITV
- Release: 17 February – 12 May 1990

Steal is a British game show that aired on ITV from 17 February to 12 May 1990. It is hosted by Mark Walker, son of Catchphrase presenter Roy Walker, with Stephen Rhodes as the voiceover.

Contestants competed to win cash and prizes by uncovering symbols on a gameboard in a test of their recall abilities. Its mascot was Jools, a computer-animated, thieving orange cat in a red cap and a black-and-white striped sweater.

== Gameplay ==
Two teams, each consisting of one man and one woman, competed through two rounds in the main game to win ("steal," in the show's parlance) cash and prizes by uncovering them on a 4-by-4 grid of squares. Various symbols were in the squares:

- Green cash square (6): Win between £0 and £25 by pressing the buzzer to stop a randomiser.
- Swag bag (4): Win a prize, which may be valuable (e.g. a pocket translator) or worthless (e.g. a "12-piece tea set" that was actually a shattered teacup and saucer).
- Burglar mask (1): Steal a prize from the opposing team.
- Jools (3): Play an arcade-style computer game for additional cash. These games often involved Jools' cat sidekick Scruff and/or his arch-enemy, Boxer the guard dog.
- Jail (2): Awarded nothing.

=== Round 1 ===
A toss-up question was asked, open to all contestants on the buzzer. A correct answer awarded initial control to that team, while a miss awarded it to the opponents. The board was displayed to the teams for 10 seconds, then covered up and rotated 90 degrees clockwise.

The team in control was asked to find a particular symbol (cash, swag, or Jools). If they succeeded, they won whatever was associated with that square. If they found the wrong type or a jail square, they won nothing for that turn. Finding the burglar mask allowed a team to steal one prize from their opponents at any time until the end of the round.

The teams alternated choosing squares, and the round ended when all the cash and swag had been uncovered.

=== Round 2 ===
Gameplay proceeded as in Round 1, with the following changes:

- There was no initial toss-up question; the team that did not play last in Round 1 had initial control.
- The board was displayed for only 5 seconds and then turned 180 degrees.
- Green cash squares were now worth between £0 and £50.
- Finding a jail square deducted £5 from a team's score.
- Three of the six cash squares now displayed a red background instead of green. If a team found one of these, they had to press their buzzer to stop a randomiser between £0 and £50, and they lost that much cash to their opponents. When teams were asked to find cash on the board, they needed to uncover only the green squares.

The team with the higher cash total at the end of this round won the game and advanced to the bonus round. Both teams kept whatever cash and prizes they had accumulated.

=== Bonus round ===
Only one member of the winning team played this round. Five special symbols were hidden on the board: a key, bank, alarm, vault, and safe. The contestant had 60 seconds and eight chances to find these symbols in any order. Also hidden on the board were six cash squares (two each of £5, £25, and £50), and five police helmets that each deducted 5 seconds from the clock if found.

The board was shown for 5 seconds before being covered up; the innermost four squares then rotated 180 degrees counterclockwise, while the outer ring of squares rotated clockwise by the same amount.

If all five symbols were found, the team won the jackpot, which started at £1,000 and increased by £500 for each game in which it went unclaimed. Otherwise, the team received the total value of all uncovered cash squares. The jackpot maximum was £3,000 (£5,000 in Series 3).

== Reception ==
Graham Young of the Birmingham Evening Mail wrote that although Steal is "tackier than The Price Is Right", "its main contribution to television game shows will be the detailed introduction of the life-like computerised games now common in arcades, which are controlled by the contestants using special handsets." The Stage and Television Today reviewer Bill McCoid stated, "This one is typical of the genre. The emphasis is on the lightest of light entertainment. ... Good to see that the threat to quality television has receded." Phil Penfold of the Evening Chronicle said, "There are also some fun arcade games where the lovable Jools and his tatty catty partner Scruff print money, launder lolly and go fishing."
