= Leonard Weir =

Australian lyric tenor (born 1928)

Leonard Weir (born 1928 in Preston, Melbourne, Victoria) is an Australian lyric tenor best known for his performances in stage musicals in the United Kingdom, particularly in the role of Freddy Eynsford-Hill in the original London production of My Fair Lady along with Julie Andrews and Rex Harrison. He replaced John Michael King who played Freddy in the original Broadway production of the play.

Weir made a cameo appearance in the 1959 Sid James comedy film, Make Mine a Million. He appeared on UK television on Jack Hylton's Monday Show in 1958. From 1969-1970 he made several appearances in Australian television on GTV-9's popular variety show, In Melbourne Tonight.

Weir was a finalist in the 1952 Sun Aria competition.

Weir married Beverley Clare on 23 April 1953 at Scots Church, Collins Street, Melbourne. The couple met when Weir was engaged to sing at her sister's wedding. In 1954 they went to London where he studied with the Italian tenor Dino Borgioli for four years while working as a clerk at Australia House. Beverly also studied with Borgioli and obtained singing engagements in England. Weir joined the Sadler's Wells Opera Company for its production of The Merry Widow (starring fellow Australian June Bronhill).

They returned to Australia in 1964.

Weir has two children. His son, Nick Weir, was the host of several game-shows, before becoming a cruise ship entertainment manager.
