= Family Catchphrase =

- Created by: Stephen Radosh
- Presented by: Andrew O'Connor
- Narrated by: Ted Robbins
- Composer: Ed Welch
- Country of origin: United Kingdom
- Original language: English
- No. of series: 1
- No. of episodes: 100

Production
- Running time: 30 minutes (including adverts)
- Production company: Action Time

Original release
- Network: The Family Channel
- Release: 25 December 1993 – 14 June 1994

Related
- Catchphrase

Family Catchphrase is a British family game show broadcast on The Family Channel. Presented by Andrew O'Connor, it was a spin-off of the prime-time game show Catchphrase.

== History ==
A one-off edition of Family Catchphrase was made by TVS in 1992 & broadcast on ITV on 1 January 1994, hosted by regular Catchphrase presenter Roy Walker, in which teams of family would play Catchphrase. In early 1994, The Family Channel (now Challenge) produced a spin-off series of Family Catchphrase, hosted by Andrew O'Connor. The game was played by teams of two related players (normally parent and child) and featured slightly different rules to the normal game. The teams played for points rather than pounds and the second round would feature the players taking alternative turns, rather than answering the phrases as a team.

As The Family Channel was an early satellite and cable channel, prizes were not as expensive due to a smaller budget although the M Square prize wasn't revealed unless it had been won. However, it wasn't uncommon to see prizes such as a Master System games console or a daytrip to Thorpe Park given away as prizes.

The graphics and music were taken from the normal version of the show.

== Main game ==
The main gameplay was the same as the normal Catchphrase, but each player played for points instead of money.

=== Round One ===
The team that won the coin toss before the show would select the point value of the catchphrases in that round (10 to 50). The computer would draw a catchphrase, a bell would ring and the team that guessed correctly would win the points.

=== Bonus Catchphrase ===
The team that guessed the catchphrase correctly would get a chance at solving the Bonus Catchphrase. The catchphrase value doubled each round (50, 100, 200 etc.). The point drop also increased in value by five each round (5, 10, 15 and so on).

=== Solo Shoot ===
The teams played as a one-on-one battle, with first the children playing and then the adults. Beforehand, one of the teams decided the point value (60 to 100). The rest of the rules were the same for that round.

=== Fast and Furious ===
Based on Roy Walker's Ready Money Round, O'Connor's version was renamed "Fast and Furious" because there was no money involved. Unlike Walker's round, the randomiser could select any amount on the screen from 110 to 150 points. There was no bell for this round.

== Super Catchphrase ==
The final round was the same as Walker's series except the M square's prize was "a mystery prize" according to O'Connor.

== Famous guests ==
One episode of Family Catchphrase featured a guest appearance from Steven Radosh, creator of Catchphrase. Another episode featured an appearance by the then unknown comedian Simon Amstell and his aunt as contestants. Amstell was only about 14 years old at the time.

== Transmissions ==
100 episodes were transmitted on The Family Channel in 1994, including a Christmas special broadcast on Christmas Day 1993 and New Year's Day 1994.

Some ITV regions showed some episodes (usually a small number) after their airing on The Family Channel.
