= Heather Mills =

English former model, media personality, businesswoman, and activist (born 1968)

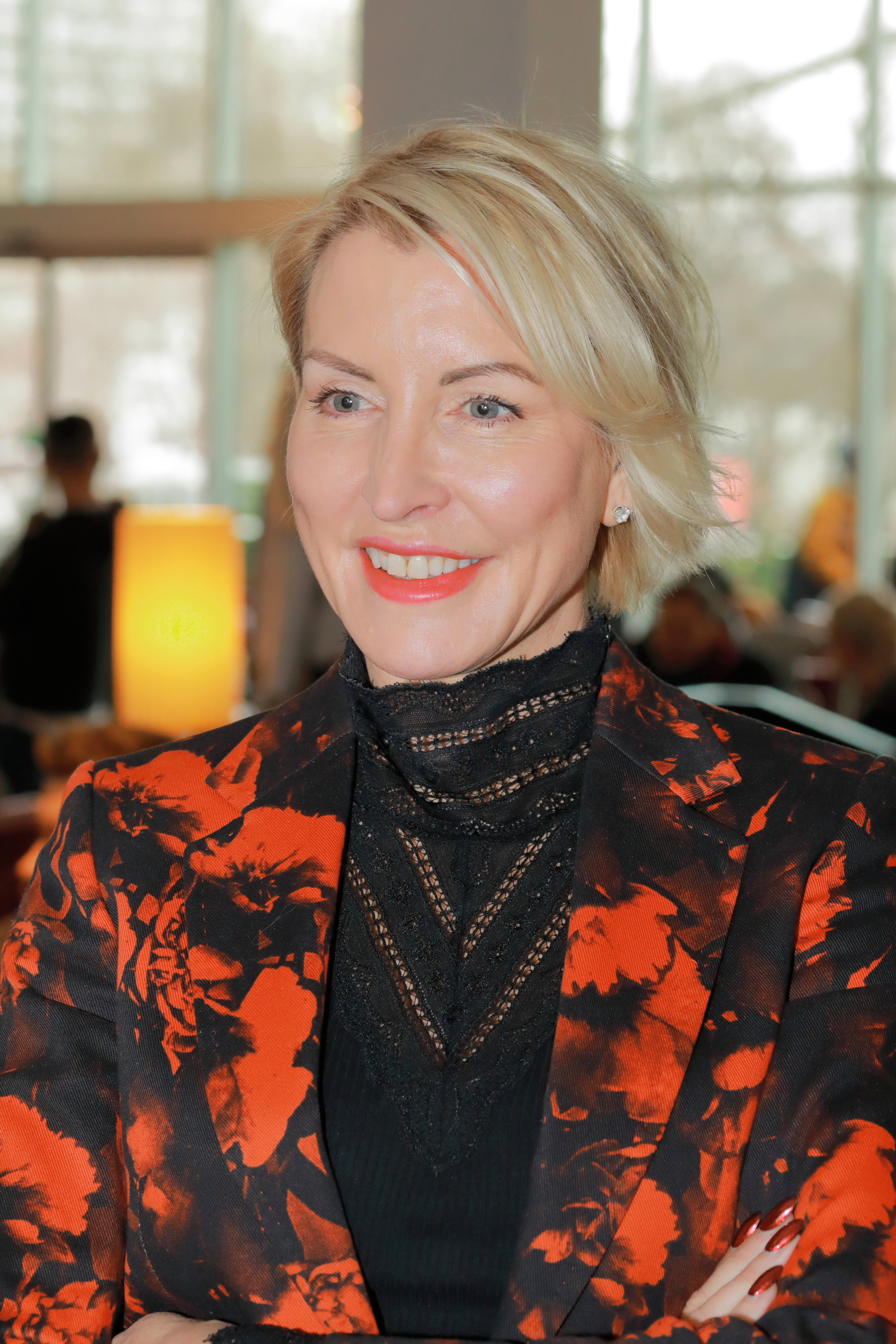
- Mills in 2019
- Born: Heather Anne Mills; 12 January 1968 (age 58); Aldershot, Hampshire, England
- Other name: Heather Mills McCartney
- Education: Usworth Grange Primary & Comprehensive School, Washington, Tyne and Wear; Hydeburn Comprehensive, London
- Occupations: Businesswoman; animal rights activist; model
- Spouses: Alfie Karmal (m. 1989; div. 1991) Paul McCartney (m. 2002; div. 2008)
- Children: 1
- Relatives: Charles Stapley (stepfather)
- Website: heathermills.org

Heather Anne Mills (born 12 January 1968) is an English former model, businesswoman and animal rights activist. She came to public attention in 1993 when she was a model and was run over by a police motorcycle in London. The accident resulted in the amputation of her left leg below the knee, but she continued to model using a prosthetic limb. She had begun a relationship with Paul McCartney by the end of 1999. They married in June 2002 and Mills gave birth to a daughter the following year. They separated in 2006, and finalised their divorce in 2008.

After her marriage to McCartney, Mills became involved in animal rights advocacy and as of 2024 was a patron of Viva! and Viva! Health. She is also vice-president of the Limbless Association.

== Early life and education ==
Heather Anne Mills was born on 12 January 1968 in Aldershot, Hampshire, to John 'Mark' Francis Mills, a former British paratrooper, and his wife, Beatrice Mary (née Finlay) Mills, who was the daughter of a colonel in the British Army. John was adopted at the age of seven and grew up in Brighton, where his adoptive parents had a grocery shop. His adoptive father also worked as a mechanic for a Grand Prix racing team. Beatrice was born in India during World War II, and was educated at English boarding schools. John and Beatrice met at Newcastle University, and were married against the wishes of her father, who did not attend the wedding and saw his daughter only once more before he died.

Beatrice spoke several languages and played the piano, while Mark played banjo and guitar, liked photography (winning an Evening Standard award) and took part in numerous sports. He was very fond of animals (working for the RSPCA for a time), and Heather remembered her family always having a dog and a cat, as well as once having a pet goose and a white nanny goat that was allowed to roam the house owned by Mark's parents in Libanus, near Brecon.

The Mills family spent their holidays in Libanus, and also lived there for a time. When Heather was six years old, the family moved north to Alnwick, in Northumberland, but relocated shortly afterwards to a block of flats in Washington, Tyne and Wear, and then on to Cockshott Farm, in Rothbury, Northumberland.

She later wrote that, when she was eight years old, she and her next-door neighbour were kidnapped and sexually assaulted by a swimming pool attendant. However her neighbour, Margaret Ambler, said that Mills was never a victim, and the pool attendant did not commit suicide, as she had written. Despite having received a letter from Mills offering £10,000 to stop a court case, Ambler complained that the story had caused her deep discomfort by bringing the incident to national attention, so she sued for breach of privacy, accepting an out-of-court settlement of £5,000 in compensation and £54,000 legal costs.

Beatrice left home when Heather was nine years old, to live with Crossroads actor Charles Stapley, which left her, her older brother Shane, and her younger sister Fiona, in the care of their father John. Heather once said that John threw Shane against a window for making a mess on the carpet with crayons; the window broke and Shane had to be taken to hospital, where John explained that the boy had fallen on some glass in the garden. Fiona said: "Our family were always short of money and our father demanded that we find food and clothes so we turned to shoplifting, learnt to hide from the bailiffs and became experts at domestic duties. I'm not ashamed to say that we were forced to steal because when you are a young child, you'd rather do that than face a beating from your father." John disputed his daughters' allegations that he was violent towards them, later releasing home movies of family holidays in Wales, showing Mills playing happily.

Mills attended Usworth Grange Primary school, and then Usworth Comprehensive School in Washington. She visited Usworth Comprehensive in 2003, as guest of honour at a prize-giving event, and to support the school against plans for its closure.

== London and modelling ==
When Heather's father was jailed for 18 months after being convicted of fraud, she left home with her sister Fiona to live with their mother and her partner in Clapham, south London. Shane went to Brighton to live with his paternal grandparents. Heather later wrote that at the age of 15, she ran away to join a funfair, and lived in a cardboard box under Waterloo station for four months, although Stapley denied this by saying that she occasionally left home at weekends to travel with a young man who worked for a funfair in London. During Heather's stated period of homelessness, her school records indicated that she and Fiona were both enrolled at Usworth comprehensive in Tyne and Wear until April 1983, and at Hydeburn Comprehensive, in Balham, on 6 June that year, where they both stayed until 2 July 1984. Heather remembered that a teacher at the Hydeburn once said, "there's no hope for her at all", and that she left school with no academic qualifications. In the same year, her father had another daughter, Claire Mills, with a new partner.

Mills worked for a croissant shop, but was sacked, and vowed "never to work for anyone else again". She wrote in her 1995 autobiography that the owner of a jewellery shop in Clapham gave her a job on Saturdays, but Jim Guy, the owner of Penrose Jewellers, later stated: "Everything she wrote about me was lies, I never gave her a job; she just hung around and made tea. She told me her father was dead. The only thing that was true was she nicked stuff from the shop," which Guy said was worth £20,000. Heather admitted that she had stolen some gold chains and sold them to buy a moped, and when Guy reported the theft, she was put on probation.

Alfie Karmal, the son of a Palestinian father and Greek mother, was ten years older than Mills when they met in 1986. Karmal bought her new clothes and Cartier jewellery, and paid for cosmetic surgery to her breasts. Karmal, who had moved into the computer industry, set up a model agency for her, ExSell Management, although it was unsuccessful. In 1987, Mills went to live in Paris, telling Karmal that a cosmetics company had given her a modelling contract, but instead she became the mistress of millionaire Lebanese businessman George Kazan for two years and took part in a nude photo session for a stills-only German sex education manual called Die Freuden der Liebe (The Joys of Love).

After returning to London, Mills asked Karmal to marry her. Karmal said yes, but on one condition: "I told her I couldn't marry her until she did something about her compulsive lying, and she agreed to see a psychiatrist for eight weeks. She admitted she had a problem and said it was because she'd been forced to lie as a child by her father." Although Mills proposed to Karmal, she later said that every man she has been out with "has asked me to marry him within a week". The couple married on 6 May 1989. While married to Karmal, she suffered two ectopic pregnancies, so in 1990, Karmal paid for her to go on holiday to Croatia with his children and ex-wife (with whom Mills had become friends), but Mills ended up living with her Slovenian ski instructor, Miloš Pogačar, shortly before the Croatian War began. Mills set up a refugee crisis centre in London, helping over 20 people to escape the war. She drove to deliver donations to Croatia, taking modelling assignments in Austria on the way to pay for the trip, later saying that she "worked on the front line in a war zone in the former Yugoslavia for two years where there were mines everywhere that weren't marked." Karmal and Mills were divorced in 1991, and Mills was engaged to Raffaele Mincione (a bond dealer for the Industrial Bank of Japan) in 1993.

== Accident and leg amputation ==
On 8 August 1993, Mills and Mincione walked to the corner of De Vere Gardens and Kensington Road, London, but while crossing Kensington Road, Mills was knocked down by a police motorcycle, the last in a convoy of three, which was responding to an emergency call. Mills suffered crushed ribs, a punctured lung, and the loss of her left leg 6 inches (15 cm) below the knee; a metal plate was later attached to her pelvis. In October 1993, she had another operation that further shortened her leg. Mills was awarded £200,000 by the police authority as recompense for her injuries, (equivalent to £430,410 in 2025) even though the police motorcyclist was later cleared by magistrates of driving without due care and attention. After the accident, Mills sold her story to the News of the World, and gave other interviews, saying she earned £180,000. She used the money to set up the Heather Mills Health Trust, which existed from 2000 to 2004 and delivered prosthetic limbs to people (particularly children) who had lost limbs after stepping on landmines. Mills often showed people her prosthetic leg, once taking it off during an interview on the American talk show Larry King Live, in 2002.

Mills booked herself into the Hippocrates Health Institute in Florida, which put her on a raw food vegan diet, using wheat grass and garlic poultices to heal her wound. After an operation, Mills discovered that she had been previously identified as having an O rhesus negative blood type, when in fact she was A rhesus negative, which had interfered with her attempts to follow the so-called blood type diet. As her prosthetic leg had to be replaced on a regular basis, and because the size of the amputated stump kept changing as it healed, she had the idea to collect thousands of discarded prosthetic limbs for amputees in Croatia. Mills persuaded the Brixton prison governor to get inmates to dismantle and pack the prosthetic limbs before being transported, which resulted in 22,000 amputees obtaining limbs in addition to the Croatian citizens who were already supplied with prosthetic limbs by the Croatian Institute for Health Insurance, which paid for the fitting of limbs and rehabilitation of patients. The first convoy of limbs arrived in Zagreb in October 1994, and Mills travelled with the convoy to film interviews with some of the recipients for the daytime television programme Good Morning with Anne and Nick. She received an award in 2001 from Croatia's prime minister, Ivica Račan for the money she raised to help clear that country of landmines.

With the help of ghostwriter Pamela Cockerill, Mills wrote a book about her experience, entitled Out on a Limb (1995), which was republished in the United States as A Single Step (2002). Extracts from Out on a Limb were serialised in the Daily Mail in March 2000. Mills handed all the proceeds from the book to Adopt-A-Minefield, and stated that it was one of 'the few charities where 100% of their donations goes to clear minefields and survivor assistance'. In 1995, Mills became engaged to British media executive Marcus Stapleton after being together for 16 days; she was then engaged to documentary filmmaker Chris Terrill in 1999, after 12 days in Cambodia, where they were making a film about landmines. Mills ended their relationship five days before their planned wedding day, later telling friends in the media that she had called the wedding off because Terrill was gay, an MI6 agent, and that his mission was to sabotage her anti-landmine work. Terrill had once told Mills that he had been interviewed by the intelligence services when he was thinking of a career with the Foreign Office, but later said: "I soon realised that Heather had a somewhat elastic relationship with the truth, which she was able to stretch impressively sometimes." Terrill also claims that although Mills said she was a vegetarian at the time, she often cooked her speciality dish, Lancashire hotpot (which contains lamb), for him; her former sister-in-law, Dianna Karmal, claims that Mills became a vegetarian after meeting McCartney.

In 2003, the Open University awarded Mills an honorary doctorate for her philanthropic work on behalf of amputees. She continues to campaign, in addition to promoting the distribution of prostheses around the world, and has been involved with the development of the Heather Mills McCartney Cosmesis, which gives amputees in America the chance to wear a Dorset Orthopaedic cosmesis without having to travel to the UK. Mills is also vice-president of the Limbless Association. In 2004, Mills received a "Children in Need" award from the annual International Charity Gala in Düsseldorf; in the same year, the University of California, Irvine gave her their 2004 Human Security Award and created the Heather Mills McCartney Fellowship in Human Security to support graduate students conducting research on pressing human security issues. She is a former Goodwill Ambassador for the United Nations Association Adopt-A-Minefield programme.

== Relationship with Paul McCartney ==
Mills met McCartney at the Dorchester Hotel during the Pride of Britain Awards event on 20 May 1999, which McCartney had attended to present an award to an animal rights activist. Mills presented the Outstanding Bravery Award to Helen Smith, also making an appeal on behalf of the Heather Mills Health Trust. McCartney also presented an award dedicated to his late wife, Linda McCartney, and later talked to Mills about donating to her charity, later giving her £150,000 (equivalent to £287,338 in 2025). In the autumn of 1999, Mills and her sister Fiona recorded "VO!CE", a song they wrote to raise funds for Mills's charity. After recording the song in Greece, where Fiona lived, running the independent label Coda Records, the sisters stayed overnight at McCartney's estate in Peasmarsh, Sussex, in early November, where McCartney added vocals to the song.

Having sparked the interest of the tabloids about his appearances with Mills at events, McCartney appeared publicly beside her at a party in January 2000 to celebrate her 32nd birthday. While on holiday in the Lake District, McCartney proposed to Mills on 23 July 2001, giving her a £15,000 diamond and sapphire ring he had purchased in Jaipur, India, while they were there on holiday.

=== Marriage ===
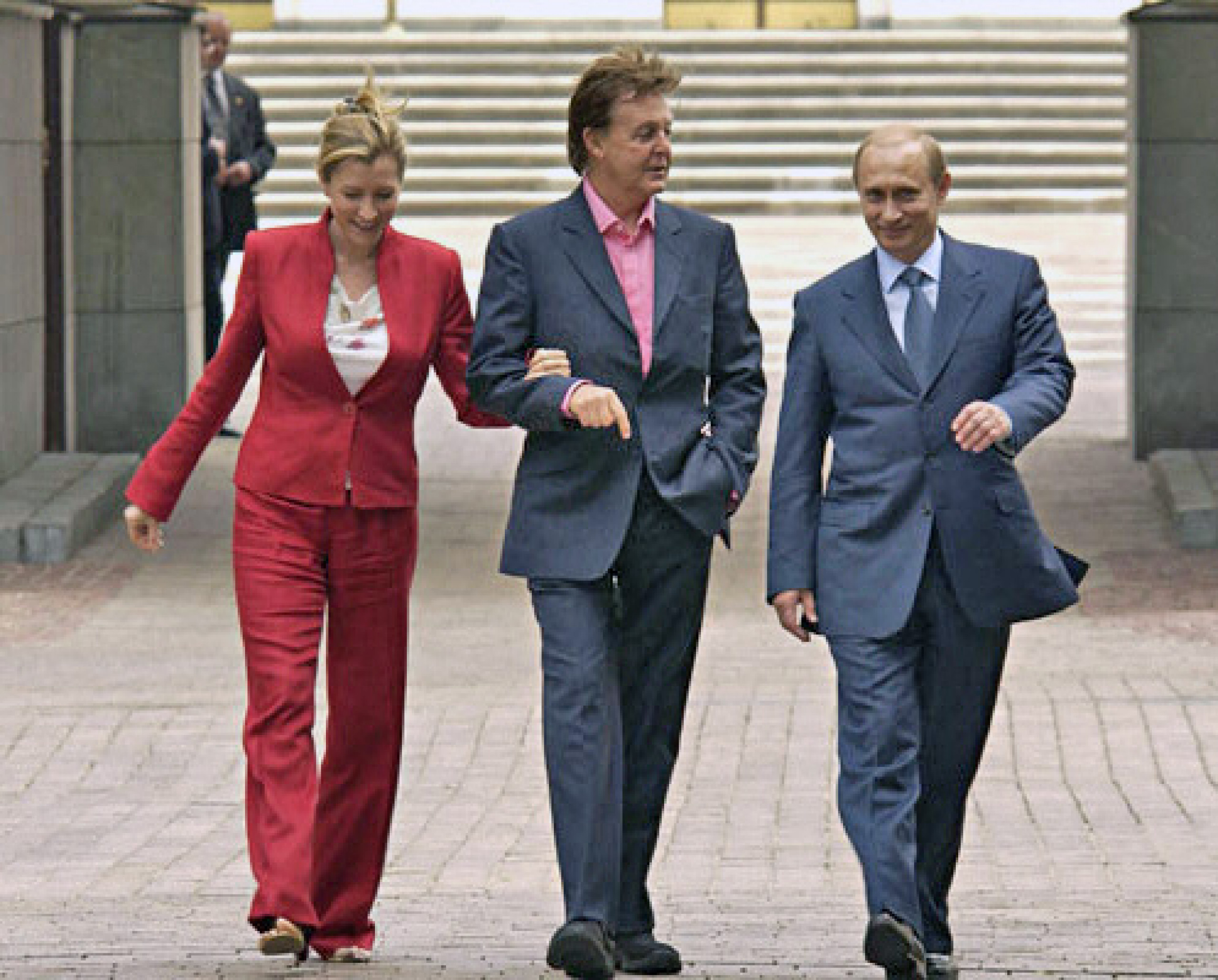
Mills, McCartney and Vladimir Putin during a tour of the Kremlin in 2003

Mills and McCartney were married on 11 June 2002, four years after his first wife Linda had died of breast cancer. The McCartney–Mills wedding was an elaborate ceremony at Castle Leslie, in the village of Glaslough in County Monaghan, Ireland. A song specially composed by McCartney, called "Heather", was played; this had been included on the 2001 album Driving Rain.

Mills said that she liked to cook traditional vegetarian Christmas dinners for McCartney and as many of his family as possible, and that McCartney had encouraged her to give up her self-confessed addiction to chocolate and Snickers bars. When asked by chat-show host Larry King in 2003 how life was with McCartney, Mills replied, "Great, really great", but also said that she was surprised at how tidy McCartney was: "He always cleans up before the cleaner comes. So I said for a while that's crazy, but what's good is if I cook the dinner, he'll clean everything up."

In 2003, McCartney played a concert in Red Square, Russia. Vladimir Putin gave the couple a tour of the Kremlin. McCartney later said that Mills's contribution was giving him an acrylic fingernail to protect a finger on his left hand that often bled after playing guitar. McCartney stated that he felt inspired by Mills, as "Being in love with her makes me want to write songs", such as "Too Much Rain" for the album Chaos and Creation in the Backyard (2005), and "See Your Sunshine" ('She makes me feel glad/I want her so bad') for his album Memory Almost Full (2007). Another composition inspired by Mills was used as the bridal march at their wedding.

=== Parenthood ===
During an appearance on the chat show Parkinson, on 22 February 2003, host Michael Parkinson asked if it was because of McCartney that Mills did not give any interviews, and she replied that she wanted to protect McCartney, his children, and their privacy. At the same time, she said that her previous ectopic pregnancies had damaged her fertility, and that her chances of getting pregnant were small, although the couple announced in May that they were expecting their first child. Mills gave birth to Beatrice Milly McCartney on 28 October 2003 at the Hospital of St John and St Elizabeth in St John's Wood; she was named after Mills's mother and McCartney's aunt. It was later revealed that Mills had suffered a miscarriage in the first year of their marriage.

Mills was invited by Larry King to interview Paul Newman, which was broadcast by CNN on 17 April 2004.

=== Separation ===
After some time apart, Mills and McCartney separated on 17 May 2006. In November 2007, Mills gave a number of interviews, saying that the breakdown of the marriage was caused by her husband's daughter, Stella, whom she described as "jealous" and "evil". Mills had previously talked with New York magazine, saying Stella had once issued a press release confirming how much she liked her new stepmother, although Stella's publicist denied that such a statement had ever been issued.

After dismissing Anthony Julius, a Mishcon de Reya lawyer, Mills stated she would represent herself in the upcoming divorce hearing, with help from her sister Fiona, David Rosen, a solicitor-advocate, and Michael Shilub, an American attorney. In leaked documents, Mills complained that McCartney was often drunk, smoked cannabis, stabbed her with a broken wine glass, pushed her over a table, and pushed her into a bathtub when she was pregnant. Referring to her part in the marriage, Mills said that she had been a full-time wife, mother, lover, confidante, business partner, and psychologist to McCartney.

McCartney's lawyers studied Mills's book: Life Balance: The Essential Keys to a Lifetime of Wellbeing (2006), as it contradicted many of her claims, such as when she praised McCartney for "Bringing me breakfast in bed every morning, no matter how he feels, and I do the dinner, so we've got that agreement. It's thoughtfulness." Mills's father reconciled with her, after meeting her and McCartney when they introduced him to his granddaughter, Beatrice. After their separation, he said that it "took guts to represent yourself at the High Court", and that he was proud of his daughter, even though he thought she would be "torn to shreds" by McCartney's lawyers.

=== Divorce ===
The case was heard in court 34 at the Royal Courts of Justice in London. At the start of the proceedings, Mills asked for £125 million, but McCartney offered £15.8 million. Before the court case, Mills had employed the accountancy firm Lee and Allen to examine McCartney's publishing company, business assets, and properties, claiming that she had a tape recording of McCartney admitting his true worth, but the presiding judge, Mr Justice Bennett, based his decision on a forensic valuation of McCartney's finances completed by accounting firm Ernst & Young.

The hearing took six days, finishing on 18 February 2008, and the judgement was made public on 17 March that year. Mills was eventually awarded a lump sum of £16.5 million, plus assets of £7.8 million, which included the properties she owned at the time. The total was £24.3 million (equivalent to £39,614,553 in 2025) plus payments of £35,000 per annum for a nanny and school costs for their child. In his judgement, Mr Justice Bennett stated:

The husband's evidence was, in my judgement, balanced. He expressed himself moderately though at times with justifiable irritation, if not anger. He was consistent, accurate and honest. But I regret to have to say I cannot say the same about the wife's evidence. Having watched and listened to her give evidence, having studied the documents, and having given in her favour every allowance for the enormous strain she must have been under (and in conducting her own case) I am driven to the conclusion that much of her evidence, both written and oral, was not just inconsistent and inaccurate but also less than candid. Overall, she was a less than impressive witness.

Mr Justice Bennett said in his ruling that there was no evidence of Mills's "charitable giving" in her tax returns, ridiculed her claim to have been McCartney's business partner as "make-belief" and said she was an "explosive and volatile" personality who could be her "own worst enemy". He also rejected her argument that she had rekindled McCartney's "professional flame" after he had lost his first wife, Linda, to cancer.

Regarding her career, the judge said:

I find that, far from the husband dictating to and restricting the wife's career and charitable activities, he did the exact opposite. He encouraged it and lent his support, name and reputation to her business and charitable activities. The facts as I find them do not in any way support her claim.

In anger at the judgement, Mills poured a jug of water on the head of Fiona Shackleton, McCartney's solicitor, in the courtroom.

The preliminary divorce was granted on 12 May, and the decree absolute became final a week later.

During their marriage, Mills was known as Heather Mills McCartney, but after her divorce, she reverted to Heather Mills, although as the former wife of a knight she is entitled to the title "Lady McCartney" unless she remarries. In 2012, she was called "Heather Mills" and "Ms Mills" in her testimony to the Leveson Inquiry and its subsequent report, though Lord Justice Leveson had referred to "Lady McCartney" earlier in the proceedings.

Following her divorce from Paul McCartney, Mills bought a house in Robertsbridge, East Sussex, in 2007.

== Media image ==
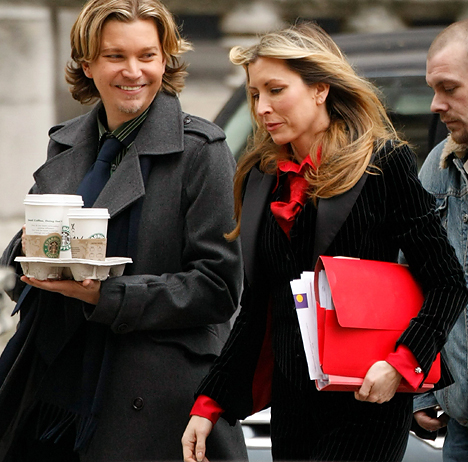
Heather Mills with Mark Payne attending court in London in 2010

Mills's relationship with McCartney triggered considerable media interest. After her divorce, the attitude of the British media was hostile. Mills frequently accused the press of misquoting her and of using material out of context to give a negative impression of her, telling the Evening Standard that the claims that she had married McCartney for his money were more hurtful than losing her leg.

A journalist with the same name, Heather Mills, at that time working for The Observer, accused Mills of impersonating her for over a year in the late 1990s, showing people cuttings of articles the journalist had written.

It was reported that she had been nominated for the 1996 Nobel Peace Prize because the Heather Mills Health Trust had donated thousands of prosthetic limbs to landmine victims, but the nomination cannot be confirmed because the identities of nominees remain secret for 50 years.

Mills's stepfather disputed her statement that her mother had nearly lost a leg in a car crash, after Mills said: "her leg was only hanging on by a tiny flap of skin and flesh...miraculously the surgeons managed to insert a metal plate and re-attach it". Stapley said that Mills's mother had suffered a leg injury after a car crash, but recovered and was "a keen tennis player" and that Mills "is simply a very confused woman for whom reality and fantasy have become blurred".

Mills said that she had once been asked to stand for parliament by the three main political parties, and had been offered a peerage in 2001 (to become Baroness Mills) by the then British Prime Minister, Tony Blair, and a certain 'Lord MacDonald'. An ITV documentary (McCartney vs McCartney: The Ex Files) interviewed three men named Lord MacDonald, but not one of them could remember ever meeting Mills. British journalist Jasper Gerard, to whom Mills made the claims, also says she told him that she had cancelled a meeting with US president Bill Clinton in case her endorsement affected a US election outcome. Mills stated that she was once awarded the title of Outstanding Young Person of the Year by the British Chambers of Commerce, but did not challenge newspapers after they discovered there was no such award.

In October 2006, Mills announced her intention to sue the Daily Mail, The Sun and the Evening Standard newspapers. All the newspapers said that their stories "were obtained by proper methods and in accordance with good journalistic practice". The Sun, which regularly refers to Mills as "Mucca" – a play on McCartney's nickname "Macca" – responded by asking her to "tick the boxes" on a series of allegations the newspaper had made, stating: "It is not clear what exactly she plans to sue us about". Underneath the questions, The Sun listed six allegations about her, with a blank box beside each of them. The words beside the boxes read: "Hooker, Liar, Porn Star, Fantasist, Trouble Maker, Shoplifter".

Later that year, Mills told the BBC that she had received death threats, and on 17 December, police stated that a "non-specific threat" had been made to her safety. This led to more criticism that she was calling out the emergency services too often. Three months later, Chief Superintendent Kevin Moore of Sussex Police, said that Mills was running "the risk of being treated as the little boy who cried wolf", and added, "We do have to respond to a disproportionate high volume of calls from Heather Mills McCartney because of the situations she finds herself in, and this is regrettable as it takes officers away from other policing matters." Mills responded that the police had told her to contact them whenever she was being harassed.

During a five-day trial in July 2007, it was revealed that Mills had been physically assaulted in Brighton by Jay Kaycappa, who had been trying to photograph Mills while on shifts for a national newspaper and a regional press agency. Kaycappa, who had 132 previous criminal convictions, was found guilty and sentenced to a 140-hour community order and ordered to pay Mills £100, plus £1,000 court costs. Kaycappa later won an appeal against the conviction after the Crown did not respond to the appeal because of difficulties in bringing witnesses to give evidence.

During several interviews in October that year, Mills accused the media of giving her "worse press than a paedophile or a murderer". She also criticised the media over the treatment of Diana, Princess of Wales – whom Mills described as having been "chased and killed" by paparazzi – and of Kate McCann. Immediately before her giving these interviews, Phil Hall (a former News of the World editor) quit as her PR adviser.

In 2008, a survey commissioned by Marketing magazine showed Mills as one of the top four most-hated celebrity women, along with Amy Winehouse, Victoria Beckham, and Kerry Katona. In December of that year, the Channel 4 television comedy Star Stories broadcast a satirical mockumentary of Mills's life story from her point of view. In 2009, after petitioning the Press Complaints Commission in the UK about being lied about in the press, five British tabloids (The Sun, Daily Express, News of the World, Sunday Mirror, and Daily Mirror) publicly apologised to Mills about printing false, hurtful, or defamatory stories about her. Another tabloid (Daily Mail), sent a private letter of apology. Mills complained in 2007 that over 4,400 abusive articles about her had been published.

=== Criticism of press coverage ===
In 2002, Mills accepted damages of £50,000 plus costs from the Sunday Mirror after a false report that the Charity Commission had investigated her about the money she raised for the Indian Earthquake Victims Appeal in 2001. The extent and nature of the British press coverage of Mills has been criticised, as in May 2003, when The Guardian columnist Matt Seaton wrote a piece declaring: "There is little that is edifying in the symbolic lynching of Heather. The poisonous judgmentalism that drives it, is in the worst tradition of small town gossip. It is prurient, spiteful, hypocritical, and we should cry 'shame' on it." Publicist Mark Borkowski wrote in The Independent on Sunday, on 23 March 2008: "Not since the cult of Myra Hindley have we encountered so much vitriol aimed at one woman." Feminist writer Natasha Walter compared the coverage to that of Britney Spears. Terence Blacker wrote that public figures who are young, female, pretty, and fair-haired, are often subjected to public bullying, which is explained as "intense media interest", such as Diana, Princess of Wales, Paula Yates, Ulrika Jonsson and Mills.

Kira Cochrane, in The Guardian, wrote of "every misogynist epithet available" being used against Mills. "She has somehow become the vessel through which it is acceptable for both pundits and the public to express their very worst feelings about women." Joan Smith, writing in The Independent, said that newspaper "bullies love a weakling", quoting the front-page headline of the British tabloid newspaper Daily Mirror which read "Lady Liar", and The Sun newspaper writing "Pornocchio" over Mills's face (in reference to Mills's past saucy photographs, and the nose of Pinocchio getting longer when he lied). Smith further said Mills had "dreamt of becoming the wife of a famous man, but did not realise that he had fantasies of his own, marrying an attractive younger woman when he hadn't got over the loss of his first wife. Mills behaved foolishly when the marriage failed, but she does not deserve the treatment she has had in the mass-market press. It is merciless bullying of an unstable, vulnerable woman." In 2009, Mills reported that a bogus charity had been set up to extract information about her marriage. News Corp, owned by Rupert Murdoch, is alleged to have set up the sting. The Daily Mirror ran the headline "Macca marriage to Heather was mistake of the decade", following an interview that McCartney gave to Q magazine. McCartney immediately moved to deny this statement, and then went on to publicly print the original transcript on his official website to prove that the article in the Daily Mirror was false.

Celia Larkin, writing on 12 February 2012 in the Irish Sunday Independent, wrote: "There was something very satisfying about Heather Mills finally having her voice heard above the roar of the Red Tops. If you actually take the time to listen to Mills, I mean listen, not just read what's written about her, you'll see she is a strong, sincere, independent woman. She didn't lie down under the weight of McCartney's fame and wealth, she continued to plough her own furrow, campaigning for her charities, maintaining a strong individuality. And that, it seems, is the greatest sin of all. Is it any wonder she was reduced to tears in the October 2007 GMTV interview? Did we feel sympathy for her then? No. 'Heather Mills has Melt Down' screamed the headlines, so now she had lost her marbles to boot. And if that wasn't enough, Carole Malone of the Sunday Mirror, one of the papers that was relentless in its attacks on Mills, accused her of staging an act on live television, in order to further her cause in the upcoming divorce hearing. How cruel can you get?"

=== Phone hacking and Leveson Inquiry ===
On 5 May 2011, The Guardian reported that Mills had met with officers from the London Metropolitan Police who showed her evidence, seized from private investigator Glenn Mulcaire, which could form the basis of a claim against the News of The World for breach of privacy over alleged phone-hacking. Mills's name and private mobile phone number were listed in Mulcaire's notes, along with those of her friends and associates. Mills later alleged that a journalist working for the Mirror Group had admitted to her in 2001 that he had hacked her phone.

Appearing as a witness at the Leveson Inquiry on 9 February 2012, Mills was asked under oath if she had ever made a recording of McCartney's phone calls or answerphone messages, and had ever played it to Piers Morgan or "anybody else"; she replied, "Never ever." Giving evidence in December 2011, Morgan – who bragged in a newspaper column for the Daily Mail in 2006 about hearing the message – refused to say who had played him the recorded message of the call, saying he was protecting a source. Mills told the inquiry that Morgan was "a man that has written nothing but awful things about me for years and would have relished telling the inquiry if I had played a personal voicemail message to him".

In the official findings of his Inquiry, Lord Justice Leveson said Morgan's testimony under oath on phone-hacking was "utterly unpersuasive. This was not, in any sense at all, a convincing answer", adding "what it does, however, clearly prove is that he was aware that it was taking place in the press as a whole and that he was sufficiently unembarrassed by what was criminal behaviour that he was prepared to joke about it".

=== TV game show appearances ===
Mills was one of the celebrity performers competing on the US television series Dancing with the Stars in 2007, with dancing partner Jonathan Roberts. On 21 December 2009, she was revealed as one of the contestants on the fifth series of Dancing on Ice, being paired with Matt Evers.

== Activism ==
In 2005, Mills became a patron of the British animal rights organisation Viva!, and the Vegetarian and Vegan Foundation (now Viva! Health), which are both run by Juliet Gellatley.

In March 2006, McCartney and Mills travelled to Canada to bring attention to the country's annual seal hunt. Sponsored by the Humane Society of the United States, they complained that the hunt was inhumane, and called on the Canadian government to put an end to it. Their arrival on the floes sparked much attention in Newfoundland and Labrador, where 90 per cent of the sealers live. McCartney and Mills protested against seals being clubbed to death, pierced with boat hooks and sometimes skinned alive. Newfoundland and Labrador's Premier, Danny Williams, debated the issue with them on Larry King Live, the issue being that seals are no longer hunted that way, and have not been for a while. Mills joined a Viva! film team at a pig farm in Somerset, in February 2007, to publicise the use of restrictive farrowing crates, which are used for sows who are suckling piglets. A video of the investigation was made available on the Internet.

Mills's relationship with PETA ended in 2007, when McCartney's daughter Mary was chosen in her place.

In 2008, an old video surfaced of Mills wearing a mink coat that she had owned in 1989, but she explained to reporters that she had bought it years before becoming involved in animal rights organisations or vegetarianism. Although she had separated from McCartney, Mills said: "It's only since I met Paul [McCartney] that I really got to understand how vegetarianism not only benefits your health massively but also makes a huge difference to the planet, to animals, and to feeding the world." In August 2008, she was honoured by the organisation Farm Animal Rights Movement (FARM), with the Celebrity Animal Activist Award, presented at the Animal Rights National Conference.

After her divorce, Mills pledged to give a 'large portion' of her £24.3 million divorce settlement to Adopt-A-Minefield, but as of September 2008, the charity had not received any of this money.

In June 2008, Mills was asked to talk at a New York party about the cruelty of puppy farms and to promote her book about animals, but was angry about the guests talking during her speech, saying: 'Listen up at the back. I haven't been up for 24 hours and flown here from London to be ignored.' Mills's publicist of four years, Michele Elyzabeth, stopped representing her on 25 July that year.

Mills was an executive producer for the 2024 British documentary film I Could Never Go Vegan.

== Commercial interests ==
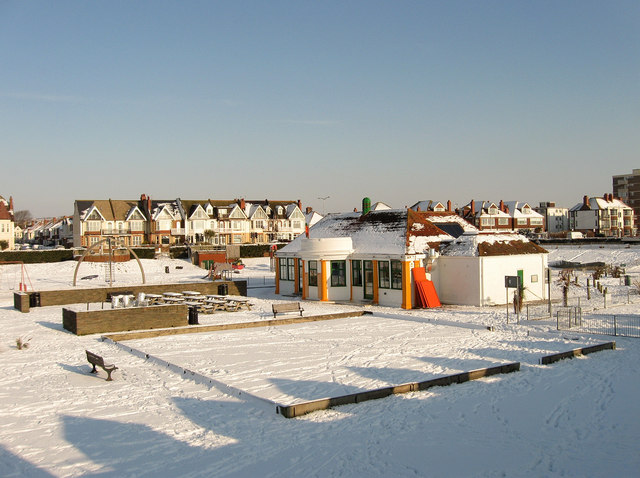
VBites Cafe

On 4 July 2009, Mills opened a vegan restaurant called VBites at Hove Lagoon, East Sussex. Mills was quoted as saying that she intended it to be the first in a worldwide chain of vegan restaurants. While promoting the restaurant, Mills gave an interview to the BBC, stating that she had been very proactive in the building stages and that now it was open, would give as much time to it as she could, working it around her charity work. In May 2013, she sold the restaurant premises to local musician Norman Cook (better-known as Fatboy Slim); the restaurant is now Big Beach Cafe at Hove Lagoon on Hove Seafront. In 2013, Mills opened a new, enlarged VBites in East Street in Brighton which closed in September 2017.

Also in 2009, Mills bought a vegan food manufacturer, The Redwood Wholefood Company, which she renamed VBites Foods. The company in Corby, Northamptonshire, sold 50 meat-free products under the brand names Cheatin', VegiDeli and Cheezly. In 2014, two products sold under the brand 'Wot no Dairy' were recalled, because it was revealed that they contained traces of dairy products and consequently could possibly cause adverse effects for those with dairy product intolerance.

In May 2018, Mills bought the 180,000 sq ft former Walkers Crisps factory in Peterlee, County Durham, which had closed in 2017.

In 2019 Mills bought the 55-acre (22 ha) site of a former Coty factory in Seaton Delaval (10 miles (16 km) north of Newcastle-upon-Tyne), which closed in 2018. Mills said that it would offer vegan businesses manufacturing, storage and office space. According to The Guardian, "Mills said it would make the region a 'world centre for the creation of planet-rescuing ideas' and the 'northern powerhouse for the brightest vegan minds'."

In July 2023, Mills bought the Boston, Lincolnshire, factory and equipment of vegan food manufacturer Plant & Bean for £2.9 million, after the company went into administration at the end of May 2023.

Mills' company VBites went into administration on 11 December 2023. At the time it was operating two factories: one in Corby, and one in Peterlee.

== See also ==
- List of animal rights advocates

== General references ==
- Beard, Lanford (2005). E! true Hollywood story : the real stories behind the glitter. Chamberlain Brothers. ISBN 978-1-59609-091-0.
- Mills, Heather; Cockerill, Pamela (1995). Out on a Limb. Little, Brown. ISBN 978-0-316-91398-0.
- Mills, Heather; Cockerill, Pamela (2002). A Single Step. Warner Books. ISBN 978-0-446-53165-8. 2nd edition of Out on a Limb
- Mills, Heather; Noakes, Ben (2006). Life Balance: The Essential Keys to a Lifetime of Well Being. Michael Joseph Ltd. ISBN 978-0-7181-4667-2.
- Simpson, Neil (2007). The Unsinkable Heather Mills: The Unauthorized Biography of the Great Pretender. Phoenix Books. ISBN 978-1-59777-557-1.
- Sounes, Howard (2010). Fab: An Intimate Life of Paul McCartney. HarperCollins. ISBN 978-0-00-723706-7.
