= Chestnut Grove School =

Chestnut Grove School may refer to:

in England

- Chestnut Grove Academy, formerly Chestnut Grove School, a school in London

in the United States

- Chestnut Grove Elementary School, a school in Decatur, Alabama
- Chestnut Grove School (Athens, Georgia), listed on the NRHP in Georgia
