= Nick Weir =

British television host

- Born: Nicholas David Weir; 20 November 1964 (age 61); Hatfield, Hertfordshire, England
- Occupations: Former entertainment executive Former entertainer and presenter
- Years active: 1997–2004 (TV); 1994–present
- Television: Waffle (1998), Grudge Match (1999–2000), Catchphrase (2000–2004)
- Parent(s): Leonard Weir (father), Beverly Weir (mother)
- Relatives: Simon Weir (brother)

Nicholas David Weir (born 20 November 1964) is an English entertainer and presenter. He was the second presenter of Catchphrase and was, until May 13, 2024, the Senior Vice President of Entertainment for Royal Caribbean International. He presented four game shows for ITV productions including Catchphrase.

== Early life ==
Nick Weir was raised by his parents Leonard and Beverly Weir along with brother Simon in Sydney, New South Wales, Australia. Both of his parents had formerly worked in cruise ship entertainment. His father was a stage actor and singer as well as a cruise director and his mother was a singer who entertained on cruises.

== Entertainment career ==
Weir began his entertainment career on cruise ships, as a singer and comedian before moving to television. In 1997, he presented the regional sports game show On the Ball in the Granada ITV region. In 1998 he presented the nationally broadcast ITV daytime game show Waffle and also co-hosted Grudge Match with Lisa Rogers from 1999 to 2000.

In 2000, Weir replaced Roy Walker as the host of the TV game show Catchphrase. During his first series, he broke his foot (filmed on 17 April 1999) during a recording from 17 April 1999 of the show by falling down the stairs as he made his entrance to the studio floor.

Between December 2001 and January 2002, he appeared in the play Aladdin as the character of the same name in the Hexagon in Reading, Berkshire.

Weir presented three series of Catchphrase until 2002, following which, the show moved to daytime and former Blue Peter presenter Mark Curry took over the show for a final 2002 series. Although his third series was filmed in 2001, this was shown on the ITV network between late 2002 and early 2004, usually on a Sunday evening or Bank Holiday Monday.

Weir also appeared as a contestant or guest on several other game shows. He was a contestant in a December 1997 episode of Give Us a Clue and appeared in Blankety Blank in 2001. Archive footage of Weir featured on ITV's 2014 series Come on Down! The Game Show Story.

== Cruise and entertainment consulting ==
Following Catchphrase, Weir served as entertainment consultant on board the Celebrity Eclipse as well as other Solstice Class ships, Celebrity Cruises' newest line of vessels.

=== Vice President of Entertainment at Royal Caribbean ===
Weir was appointed Vice President of Entertainment by Royal Caribbean on 18 September 2013, following the departure of Peter Compton. Royal Caribbean wanted Weir's combination of stage and managerial experience to push larger Vegas-style productions aboard its ships. Since becoming the vice president, Weir has overseen the launch of the Two70° theatre in the back end of the ship in the Quantum class. He has also overseen two new stage shows, Mamma Mia! and Sonic Odyssey.

== List of game shows ==
- On the Ball (1997)
- Waffle (1998)
- Grudge Match (1999–2000)
- Catchphrase (2000–2004)
- Lily Savage's Blankety Blank (2001 and 2002, as guest)

Preceded by Roy Walker	Host of Catchphrase; 2000–2004	Succeeded by Mark Curry
