= VBites =

British manufacturer of plant-based food

VBites Foods
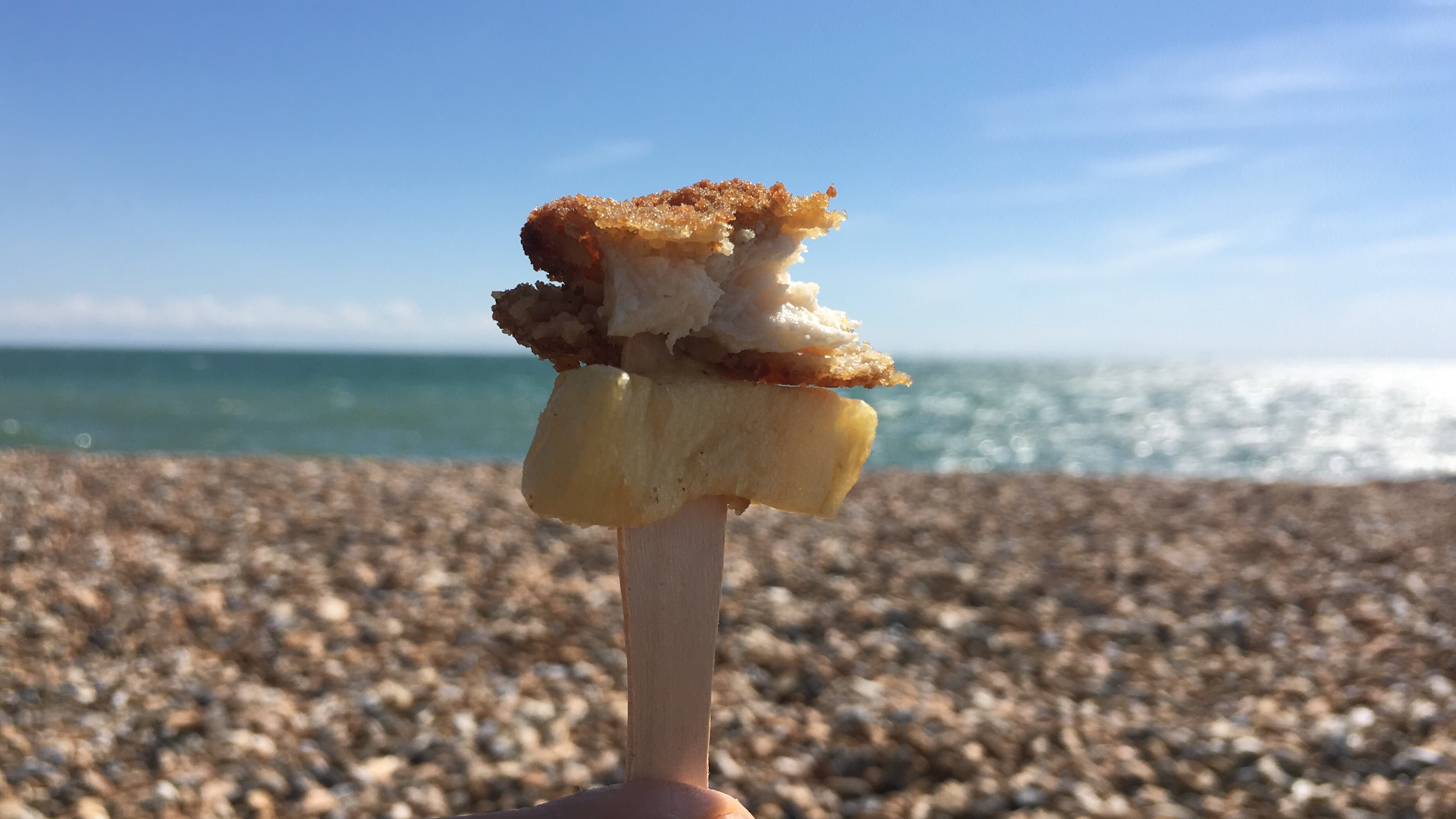
- Fish and chips made with VBites Fish Steak.
- Industry: Food
- Founded: 1993
- Headquarters: United Kingdom
- Website: vbites.com

VBites is a plant-based food manufacturer and brand (mainly meat alternatives and vegan cheeses) that develops 140 products and retails in 24 countries worldwide. All its foods are manufactured in the UK at VBites' factory in Corby.

The company was bought by Heather Mills in 2009.

The manufacturing company was founded in 1993 and mainly traded as the Redwood Wholefood Company before its name was changed to VBites in 2013 to match the restaurant Mills owned.

Brands include Cheezly - a selection of Cheese equivalents. Since 2017 Domino's Pizza have been using it for their vegan options.

In December 2023, the company collapsed into administration. It was subsequently purchased from the administrators by Heather Mills in January 2024.

== See also ==
- List of vegetarian and vegan restaurants
