= Nan Winton =

British broadcaster (1925–2019)

- Born: Nancy Wigginton; 6 November 1925; Southsea, Portsmouth, Hampshire, England
- Died: 11 May 2019 (aged 93); Dorchester, Dorset, England
- Education: Royal Academy of Dramatic Arts
- Occupations: Broadcaster and TV newsreader
- Employer: BBC
- Spouse: Charles Stapley (m. 1948; div. 1962)
- Children: 2

Nancy Wigginton (6 November 1925 – 11 May 2019), known professionally as Nan Winton, was a British broadcaster, best known for being the first female newsreader to read the national news on BBC television.

== Career ==
Winton (born Nancy Wigginton) was born on 6 November 1925 in Southsea in Portsmouth, Hampshire, the youngest of the four children of the surveyor Frank Guy Wigginton and the homemaker Evelyn Caroline Frances (née Nurse). She left school at 15, to run the household; her mother having died. Before the end of the war, she joined the Women's Land Army, becoming a drill sergeant.

In the years after the Second World War, Winton toured Italy with a theatre company to entertain the troops and gained a place at the Royal Academy of Dramatic Art. The BBC spotted her at the Ideal Home Exhibition where she was working in a live presenting role to supplement her acting. From the mid-1950s, she co-presented Information Desk, a programme to which viewers send questions, and Mainly for Women, a daytime television magazine show.

Winton was a BBC TV continuity announcer from 1958 to 1961 and also an experienced journalist, who had worked on Panorama and Town and Around. She was given the job of reading the 6pm news and weekend bulletins on Sunday evenings, in response to rivals ITN, who had a female newscaster, Barbara Mandell, from its launch in 1955. Winton worked alongside contemporaries, including Kenneth Kendall and Michael Aspel, on the national news. She was not the first woman to read the news on the BBC Television service: Armine Sandford broadcast on the BBC's West Region in Bristol from 1957.

Winton began on 20 June 1960, and her role was intended as an experiment. BBC executives believed that Winton was serious enough to counteract the prejudice that women were "too frivolous to be the bearers of grave news". Stuart Hood, a BBC manager at the time whose idea it was to appoint Winton, once confirmed that this was much the opinion of his colleagues at time as well. Winton herself recalled that she had problems with BBC editorial staff rather than the public. However, audience research concluded that viewers thought a woman reading the late news was "not acceptable". The press at the time were dismissive of Winton reading the news. She was removed from the role in March 1961. Michael Peacock was the BBC executive who sacked her. "He didn't say why", Winton recalled in 1997 "and I was furious." Winton told an interviewer for the Daily Mail in 1964: "I believe there is certainly discrimination against women in this country. There were times when I was doing the announcing when I wanted to shout aloud like Shylock 'hath not woman eyes, ears, senses? In Italy and Spain they have women newsreaders who are beautiful and sexy too. We're afraid of that here."

Winton remained the only woman to have read the national news on BBC television until 1975, when Angela Rippon became the first female BBC newsreader to be appointed permanently.

After stepping down from reading the news, Winton moved to ITV in 1961, and remained a TV and radio news reporter and interviewer. She was also a regular panellist on the radio panel game Treble Chance.

== Personal life ==
On 23 October 1948 Winton married the actor and The Rank Organisation sales representative Charles Stapley, who later appeared as Ted Hope in Crossroads. Their daughter and son were born in 1951 and 1953. Winton and Stapley divorced in 1962. She did not remarry.

She died on 11 May 2019, aged 93, three days after a fall at her house in Bridport, Dorset. The cause of her death was given as congestive heart failure, hypertension, and frailty of old age.
