= Act Your Age (radio series) =

- Genre: Panel game
- Running time: 30 minutes
- Country of origin: United Kingdom
- Language: English
- Home station: BBC Radio 4
- Starring: Simon Mayo; Jon Richardson; Lucy Porter; Roy Walker (Series 1); Adrian Walsh (Series 2)
- Created by: Ashley Blaker; Bill Matthews
- Produced by: Ashley Blaker; Bill Matthews
- Recording studio: BBC Radio Theatre
- Original release: 27 November 2008 – 23 February 2010
- No. of series: 3
- No. of episodes: 18
- Website: Official website

Act Your Age is a panel game on BBC Radio 4 hosted by Simon Mayo. The series, created by Ashley Blaker (the original radio producer of Little Britain) and Bill Matthews (co-deviser of They Think It's All Over), was first broadcast on 27 November 2008. The show features three teams of stand-up comedians from different generations: "The Up-And-Comers", featuring younger comedians, captained by Jon Richardson; "The Current Crop", featuring comedians popular at the moment, captained by Lucy Porter; and "The Old Guard", featuring older, veteran comics, captained by Roy Walker, (although in the second series, Adrian Walsh and Johnnie Casson took over for two shows each when Walker was unavailable). Most critics disliked the show. The readers of the British Comedy Guide went as far as voting it the "Worst British Radio Panel Show / Satire 2008".

== Format ==
Each episode begins with each of the contestants telling a joke as a warm-up before the first round. The rounds vary between each episode, but the main rounds consist of the panel on buzzers trying to give the best jokes, with Mayo giving points to whoever he feels gave the best material. Between each of the rounds are a selection of "Head-to-Head" rounds, with two members of different teams trying to tell as many jokes within the shortest time. The winner is the person who talks the least. The final round of the show consists of Mayo giving rapid-fire topics for the panel to make jokes on the spot.

== Reception ==
The first series of Act Your Age was disliked by most critics. Chris Campling in The Times wrote of the show that: "Mayo spent more time describing the categories than each comedian had in which to be funny. Luckily the studio audience was in the mood to laugh at everything so proceedings proceeded hastily enough, if confusingly. Away from the studio, though, and stone-cold sober, I can remember laughing only once, and even that was spitefully. It was when Stephen K. Amos said: "If we don't win I'm going to play the race card," and someone else said: "As usual."

Nick Smurthwaite wrote in The Stage that: "It wouldn't have mattered that chairman Simon Mayo's scoring was fashionably arbitrary if he'd made a wittier contribution, or helped the contestants out when they were floundering. Any panel game that is reduced to knock-knock jokes in its first outing is going to struggle to find an audience."

Readers of the British Comedy Guide voted Act Your Age the "Worst British Radio Panel Show / Satire 2008" in the Comedy.co.uk Awards (known at the times as the British Comedy Guide Awards). The BCG said: "Of those that voted in this category, almost 100% of people selected this as their least favourite 2008 radio panel show. It is perhaps not surprising as it was clear from very early on that Act Your Age was going to struggle - on the first show, one of the panellists delivered the Dr Who knock-knock joke in a desperate attempt to get a laugh!"

UKGameshows.com did criticise the show saying: "Giving the host the vote for the scoring is never a particularly strong idea (how hard would it have been to have 9 members of the studio audience hold up voting panels or something?), as if you disagree with the host's verdict you end up hating him. The scoring is not accurate enough to be fair, nor silly enough to be entertaining. And like any joke show, many patches are not as funny as the comedians would like to think." However, they did express some positive thoughts saying, "some sections are genuinely impressive and hilarious, and how the regulars keep coming up with more and more material is awe-inspiring."
