= Waffle (game show) =

- Genre: Game show
- Presented by: Nick Weir
- Announcer: Stuart Hall
- Theme music composer: Andy Blythe and Marten Joustra
- Opening theme: "Waffle Theme"
- Ending theme: "Waffle Theme"
- Composer: Andy Blythe and Marten Joustra
- Country of origin: United Kingdom
- Original language: English
- No. of series: 1
- No. of episodes: 37

Production
- Running time: 30 minutes (inc. adverts)
- Production company: Granada

Original release
- Network: ITV
- Release: 24 March – 24 June 1998

Waffle is a British game show that aired on ITV from 24 March to 24 June 1998. It was hosted by Nick Weir, in his first nationally broadcast game show.

The guests in the first episode were Lisa Riley, then-host of fellow Granada-produced show You've Been Framed!, and Jonathan Kerrigan from Casualty. Other contestants over the run of the series included Claudia Winkleman, Michael Willson (A.K.A. Cobra) from Gladiators and actor Kevin Lloyd from The Bill who died in 1998 whilst both shows were still running. He was a contestant in several episodes. Cheryl Andrews, comedian John Martin and television presenter Lionel Blair also appeared as contestants.

== Format ==
The concept behind the game is that contestants identify individual words through rebuses, rather than well-known phrases in Catchphrase. It's based on the board game Hudson's Rebus.

The prizes on the show are comically cheap and humorous, with the winning prize being a waffle toaster and the consolation prize being waffles themselves. The set features a large rotating "W" in the background, this being the "W" from the Waffle logo. The audience are seated at either end of the desk that the first round is played on, although it has been noted that with this set up, some the audience appear to have not been able to see the game very clearly. Weir introduces the show as "the show that celebrates the great British art of waffle".
