= Roy Walker (comedian) =

Northern Irish comedian (born 1940)

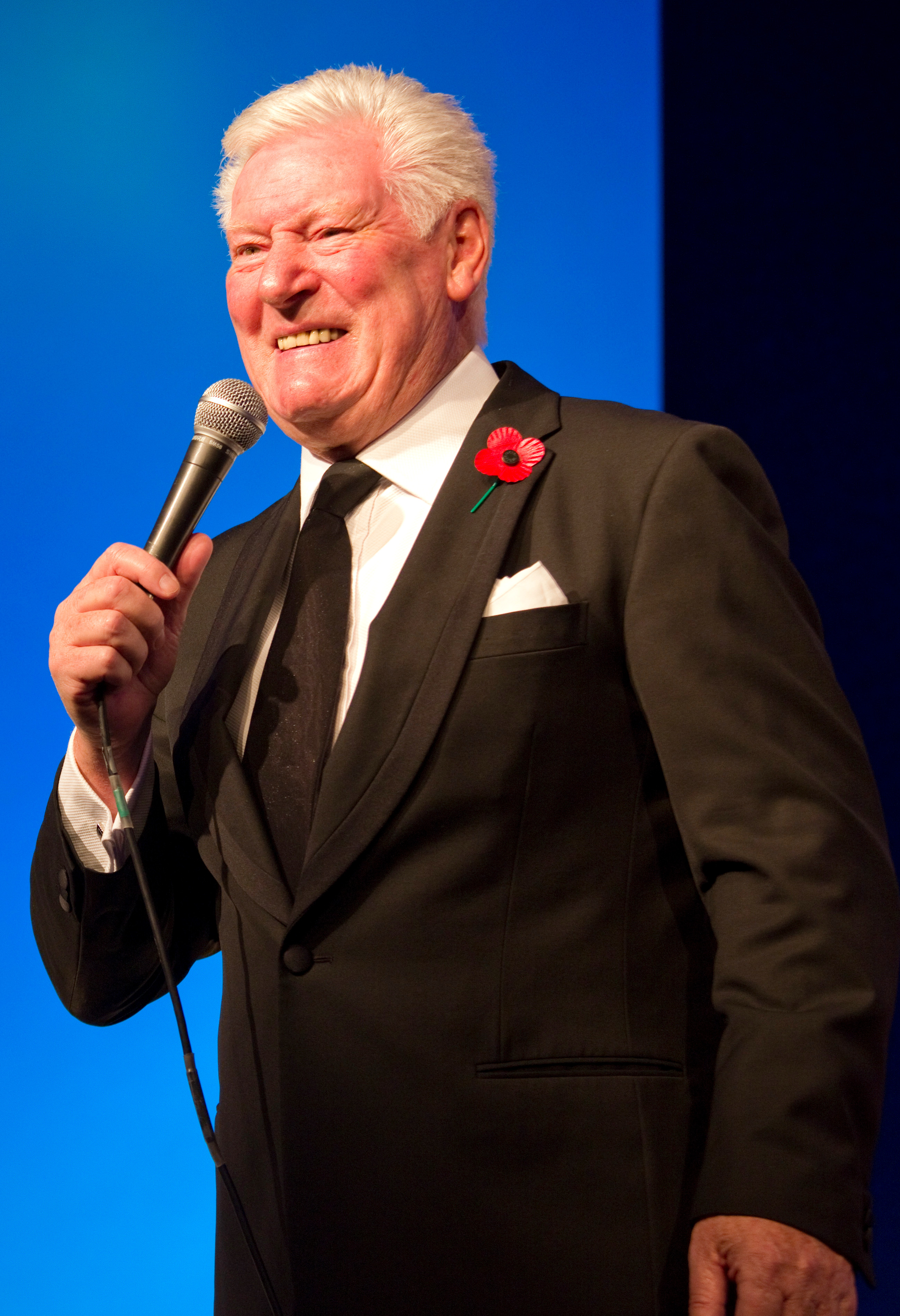
- Walker in 2012
- Born: Robert Walker; 31 July 1940 (age 86); Belfast, Northern Ireland
- Notable work: Catchphrase; The Comedians
- Spouse: Jean Walker (m. 1962; died 1989)
- Children: 3, including Josie

Comedy career
- Years active: 1977–present
- Medium: Stand-up, presenter
- Genre: Observational comedy
- Website: www.roywalker.co.uk

Robert "Roy" Walker (born 31 July 1940) is a television personality and comedian from Northern Ireland, who worked for many years as both a television presenter and comedy actor. He is best known as the original host of the game show Catchphrase between 1986 and 1999, and as one of the stars of the comedy showcase The Comedians.

== Early life ==
Born in Belfast, as a teenager Walker performed in the Francis Longford Choir, then worked as a riveter in the Harland and Wolff shipyard. He was the Ireland champion hammer thrower for three years, and represented Ireland internationally. He served in the British Army for seven years.

Walker first started work aged 12. By the end of the 1960s, he was running a pawn shop whilst working in the evenings as the compère at the Talk of the Town club in Belfast. By the late 1960s the political conflict known as The Troubles had reignited in Northern Ireland, and especially in Belfast. Though Walker was a Protestant and a Unionist, he was confronted by two men, who claimed his wife was a Catholic. They threatened him at gunpoint and gave him 24 hours' notice to close the shop. Walker complied, and the shop was destroyed. He decided to leave Northern Ireland and work in England, touring as a professional comedian, in working men's clubs and cabaret.

I'd been "Mr Belfast" but in Sunderland I had to wait by the phone at nine o'clock hoping that some other poor comic had been paid off after his first act. That seven quid got me my digs.

— Walker talking about his move to England

== Career ==
In 1977, Walker won the ITV talent show New Faces, receiving the highest mark ever given to a comedian. He was also a regular on the 1970s ITV stand-up comedy show The Comedians. He appeared on the BBC show Seaside Special on 15 July 1978. Also in 1978 he appeared in two episodes of Blackpool Bonanza. In 1984 he appeared in an episode of the comedy series The Main Attraction.

A well-dressed gent with thick greying hair and a polite air, Walker's soft Irish voice, his lack of aggression, the composed expression hiding a gentle smile, his amazing pauses which defied interruption, somehow overawing and silencing hecklers…

— Bob Monkhouse summing up Walker's comedy

Walker hosted the game show Catchphrase from 1986 to 1999. Walker coined his own catchphrases for the show: "Say what you see", and "It's good, but it's not right". On 12 June 1994, he appeared on Surprise Surprise. Other television appearances in the 1990s included You Bet!, Gagtag, Light Lunch, Wipeout (celebrity special) and TV Nightmares.

Walker appeared as himself in the first episode of Phoenix Nights on 14 January 2001. In 2002, he took part in the comedy game show It's Only TV...but I Like It and also appeared on Harry Hill's TV Burp.

In 2004, he appeared in the third series of the reality television series I'm Famous and Frightened! on Living. In 2005, Walker appeared as Monsignor in the romantic drama film The Jealous God, which was released on 9 September. On 4 March 2006, he was the Northern Ireland Regional Presenter in the UK's Eurovision Song Contest selection show Making Your Mind Up. On 12 August 2006, he appeared in an episode entitled The Comics of the documentary The Story of Light Entertainment.

In 2008, Walker was a guest on The Alan Titchmarsh Show. He presented a six-part comedy series for BBC Radio Ulster, The Way We Tell 'Em, as well as appearing on Ready Steady Cook on 5 June 2008. On 10 June, Walker appeared on Big Brother's Big Mouth as a secret special guest. Walker is an after-dinner speaker and in June 2008 spoke and presented awards at the Association of Interior Specialists (AIS) President's Lunch at the Dorchester hotel in London. In 2008, he performed at the Edinburgh Comedy Festival in his own one-hour show entitled Goodbye Mr Chips debuting on 31 July, his 68th birthday. He was also team captain on the first series of the BBC Radio 4 panel game Act Your Age.

Walker starred in Churchill Insurance adverts, alongside model Megan Hall, seen at an Indian restaurant with the Churchill Dog in 2009. On 26 May 2009, he appeared on the Britain's Got Talent show Britain's Got More Talent. Also in 2009, he appeared in a celebrity edition of the reality cookery show Come Dine with Me, which aired on 1 November—in which he came first. The other contestants were Yvette Fielding, Natasha Hamilton and Bruce Jones.

On 27 May 2013, Walker appeared on the BBC Radio 4 panel show Just a Minute, and on 6 January 2015 he was Marcus Brigstocke's guest on the same station's I've Never Seen Star Wars.

In January and February 2016, Walker appeared in the three-part BBC series The Real Marigold Hotel, which followed a group of celebrity senior citizens including Miriam Margolyes and Wayne Sleep on a journey to India.

On 27 February 2018, Walker appeared on the television show 100 Years Younger In 21 Days.

In 2022, Walker starred in the music video for David Ford's When We Were Young.

== Personal life ==
Walker lives in the Lancashire seaside resort of Lytham St Annes, which he mentioned once on Catchphrase. He has three children with his late wife Jean, who died of cancer in 1989. He was admitted to Clifton Hospital in early October 2011, following a suspected mini-stroke, and was discharged in good health the following day.

His son, Mark Walker, was the host of ITV game show Steal for 1 series in 1990.

His daughter, Josie Walker, is an Olivier Award-nominated theatre actress.

== In popular culture ==
A track on Belle & Sebastian's 2003 album Dear Catastrophe Waitress is named after Walker.

Preceded by None	Host of Catchphrase; 1986–1999	Succeeded by Nick Weir
