= John Michael King =

American actor

- Born: May 13, 1926; New York City, U.S.
- Died: August 17, 2008 (aged 82)
- Spouse: Beverly Sorg King
- Father: Dennis King

John Michael King (May 13, 1926 – August 17, 2008) was an American actor most often associated with his roles in musical theatre.

== Biography ==
The son of actor Dennis King, John Michael King was born in New York City. He made his Broadway debut in a revival of The Red Mill in 1945. He won the Theatre World Award for his portrayal of Freddy Eynsford-Hill in the original production of My Fair Lady (1956), notable for his rendition of "On The Street Where You Live".

Additional credits include Of Thee I Sing (1952), Me and Juliet (1953), Anya (1965), The King and I (1977), and Carmelina (1979). He also toured as 'Edward Moncrieff,' dropping the John from his name, in the revised version of Lerner and Lane's On a Clear Day You Can See Forever, starring Van Johnson and Linda Lavin. He later appeared with Harrison. Claudette Colbert, George Rose and Lynn Redgrave, in "Aren't We All?" on Broadway in the 80s.
