= Charles Stapley =

English actor (1925-2011)

- Born: Charles Henry Stapley; 23 July 1925; Ilford, Essex, England
- Died: 8 January 2011 (aged 85)
- Occupation: Actor
- Known for: Ted Hope in Crossroads
- Spouses: Nan Winton (m. 1948; div. 1962); 3 marriages dissolved
- Partner(s): Beatrice Mills (1978-1989)
- Children: 4
- Relatives: Heather Mills (stepdaughter)

Charles Henry Stapley (23 July 1925 – 8 January 2011) was an English actor, best known for playing Ted Hope in the television soap opera Crossroads. He also appeared in various theatrical roles, in The Benny Hill Show, and in a television version of The Adventures of Robin Hood in which he took 26 different roles.

== Early life ==
Charles Stapley was born in Ilford, Essex, the son of a business executive father who worked for the Blue Circle cement company in London. He was educated at Ilford County High School and Brighton and Hove Grammar School after the family moved to Portslade, East Sussex.

== Career ==
Stapley served in the Royal Air Force at the end of the Second World War. He then worked in the film distribution division of the Rank Organisation.

He subsequently acted in the theatre before moving into television, including playing 26 different roles in Associated Television's series The Adventures of Robin Hood in 1955–56. He appeared in The Benny Hill Show, but was best known for playing Ted Hope in the television soap opera Crossroads.

== Personal life ==
Stapley's first wife was Nan Winton, BBC television's first female newsreader. They were divorced in 1962. He had two further marriages, both of which ended in divorce. He had a son and a daughter from each of his first two marriages.

In November 1978, whilst married to his third wife, he met Beatrice Mills and they soon started an affair. She eventually left her husband Mark Mills, and moved to London to be with Stapley. Six years later, her three children joined them after Mark Mills was jailed for fraud, and Stapley became their stepfather. The eldest, then 15, was Heather Mills, who would later call him "evil" and a "snooty actor". Stapley commented that "Heather is simply a very confused woman for whom reality and fantasy have become blurred". They "repeatedly clashed in print".
