= Catchphrase (British game show) =

- Genre: Game show
- Based on: Catch Phrase by Steven Radosh
- Presented by: Roy Walker; Nick Weir; Mark Curry; Stephen Mulhern
- Theme music composer: Ed Welch (1986–92); Simon Etchell (1994–2004); Marc Sylvan (2013–); Richard Jacques (2013–)
- Country of origin: United Kingdom
- Original language: English
- No. of series: 17 (Original); 13 (Revival)
- No. of episodes: 348 (Original); 121 (Revival)

Production
- Production locations: The Maidstone Studios (1986–87, 1989–92, 2014–15, 2018–21, 2022–); TVS Television Theatre (1988–89); Television House (1994–2004); The London Studios (2012–13, 2016–17); dock10 studios (2022)
- Running time: 30 minutes (1986–2004); 45–60 minutes (2013–)
- Production companies: TVS (1986–94) (Note: Co-produced by Meridian (1993–94)); Action Time and Carlton (1994–2004); STV Studios Entertainment (2013–) (Note: Known as STV Productions from 2013–2020; In association with Digital Rights Group/NENT Studios UK (2013–2022) and All3Media International (2022–))

Original release
- Network: ITV
- Release: 12 January 1986 – 23 April 2004
- Release: 7 April 2013 – present

Related
- Family Catchphrase

Catchphrase is a British game show based on the short-lived American game show of the same name. It originally aired in the United Kingdom between 12 January 1986 and 23 April 2004. A revival premiered on ITV1 on 7 April 2013 and is still running as of 2026. Steve Radosh created the American series from which the British programme is derived.

In the game, two or three contestants have to identify a familiar phrase represented by a piece of animation. The show's mascot, a golden robot called "Mr. Chips", appears in many of the animations. The contestants then earn money based on the amount of phrases they guess correctly.

Catchphrase was presented by Northern Irish comedian Roy Walker from its 1986 premiere until 1999. Nick Weir took over hosting the programme in 2000 and hosted it until the end of series 16 on 23 April 2004. Mark Curry replaced Weir for the final series, which moved to a daytime slot and ran from 24 June to 19 December 2002. In 2012, the series was revived with new host Stephen Mulhern and later commissioned for a full series broadcast in 2013. The original format remains, although there are now three contestants instead of two, and the show has also been updated with new 3D graphics and a new concluding game.

== Format ==
Note: The description in this section primarily refers to the game played in most recent series of Catchphrase. The format has considerably changed and evolved throughout the show's forty years on air.

=== Main game ===
In the main game, at the start of each standard round, one contestant stopped a randomiser consisting of money amounts by hitting their button. The value landed on would be the amount earnt for correctly guessing the catchphrases in that round. The potential prizes increase over the rounds.

For the first round, the large screen in front of the contestants would slowly draw a visual representation of the catchphrase answer accompanied by background music (primarily using CGI). When most of the catchphrase has been revealed, contestants can then buzz in and try to guess the answer. If the player that buzzed in guessed incorrectly, the other player would be offered the chance to guess. If a player guessed correctly, they would win the predetermined amount and then have a chance to solve the bonus catchphrase.

=== Bonus Catchphrase ===
A correct answer won the contestant the predetermined money amount, plus a chance to solve the bonus catchphrase, which was hidden behind nine squares. The contestant chose a square by hitting their buzzer to randomly select one of them. That square was then removed, and the contestant had five seconds to come up with an answer. If they were right, they won the amount of money in the bonus bank, a sum of money accumulated over the contestants answering the regular catchphrases. If they were wrong, then they would have another catchphrase to guess, and the rounds cycle.

=== Quickfire round ===
Following a set amount of standard rounds, a penultimate "quickfire round" takes place. This round followed a similar structure to a standard round, except that all catchphrases were worth a fixed amount of money (originally £50) and there was no bell, so the contestants could buzz in and answer them whenever they wished and as many times until the puzzle is solved or time runs out.

The player with the most money following this round won the game and then plays the Super Catchphrase. Other contestants who do not have the most money keep their winnings, but do not move forward in the game.

=== Super Catchphrase ===
For this round, the screen displays 15 numbered squares in the form of a pyramid (with 15 at the top) with each row, starting at the bottom, being worth a higher amount of money increasing exponentially, the largest being £50,000. Number 11 in the middle is starred and correctly answering it awards a bonus prize. (In the celebrity specials, correctly answering this catchphrase doubles the amount of money won by the other two celebrities for their chosen charities.) Starting from the bottom level, the winning player has 60 seconds to reach the highest level possible. Each square still contains a catchphrase; answering a catchphrase in a level correctly clears that level and allows the player to move to the next level. At the end of the round, the player receives the prize money of the level they have last cleared, plus the bonus prize (if Square 11 is cleared), along with their main game winnings.

== Transmissions ==
=== Original ===
Series	Start date	End date	Episodes
1	12 January 1986	18 May 1986	18
2	4 January 1987	17 May 1987	20
3	9 January 1988	14 May 1988	19
4	31 December 1988	13 May 1989	19
5	2 September 1989	10 February 1990	22
6	1 September 1990	2 March 1991	25
7	19 October 1991	14 December 1991	9
8	27 June 1992	24 October 1992	15
9	30 October 1993	29 January 1994	18
9	30 September 1994	28 October 1994	18
10	4 November 1994	27 January 1995	17
10	2 March 1996	23 March 1996	17
11	30 March 1996	27 April 1996	19
11	27 September 1996	27 December 1996	19
12	3 January 1998	9 May 1998	16
12	1 November 1998		16
13	21 November 1998	27 February 1999	16
13	3 October 1999	13 November 1999	16
14	7 January 2000	18 August 2000	26
15	13 January 2001	12 May 2001	16
16 (Note: Series 16 was recorded before Mark Curry's series, but it went unaired until the episodes were scattered on random days within the ITV schedule following the conclusion of it.)	24 November 2002		21
16	5 May 2003	7 September 2003	21
16	5 April 2004	23 April 2004	21
17	24 June 2002	30 August 2002	52
17	17 December 2002	19 December 2002	52

=== Revival ===
==== Regular ====
Series	Start date	End date	Episodes	Recorded
1	7 April 2013	2 June 2013	9	2012
2	29 December 2013		13	2013
2	16 March 2014	22 June 2014	13	2013
3	14 December 2014		13	2014
3	14 June 2015	19 July 2015	13	2014
3	7 November 2015	12 December 2015	13	2014
4	2 July 2016	20 August 2016	8	2015
5	24 June 2017	19 August 2017	10	2016
5	6 January 2018		10	2016
6	18 March 2018	25 March 2018	10	2017
6	8 June 2019	27 July 2019	10	2017

==== Celebrity ====
Series	Start date	End date	Episodes	Recorded
1	17 June 2018	12 January 2019	6	2018
2	19 January 2019	26 January 2019	4	2018
2	24 November 2019		4	2018
2	3 October 2020		4	2018
3	31 August 2019	10 November 2019	7	2019
3	8 December 2019		7	2019
3	26 September 2020		7	2019
4	22 December 2019	19 September 2020	8	2019
4	10 October 2020		8	2019
5	24 December 2020	29 May 2021	10	2020
6	4 September 2021	26 December 2021	13	2021
6	4 March 2023		13	2021
7	1 January 2022	2 April 2022	10	2021
8	12 June 2022		10	2022
8	1 January 2023	25 February 2023	10	2022
8	31 August 2024		10	2022
9	24 December 2022		10	2022
9	22 October 2023		10	2022
9	6 January 2024		10	2022
9	7 September 2024	19 October 2024	10	2022
10	10 June 2023		12	2023
10	30 December 2023		12	2023
10	23 March 2025	1 June 2025	12	2023
11	7 December 2025		10	2025
11	3 January 2026		10	2025
11	21 March 2026	TBD 2026	10	2025

== Notable moments ==
=== "Snake Charmer" (1994) ===
One of the most famous moments in the show's history included a Bonus Catchphrase where the puzzle was uncovered in a way which made Mr. Chips and a snake appear to be performing a sexual act. The audience, the contestants and host Roy Walker laughed uncontrollably as the puzzle was revealed. Originally broadcast on 30 December 1994 as the ninth episode of series ten, this was edited in the original ITV broadcast, but it did appear uncensored two years later on the out-take show It'll Be Alright on the Night.

=== "Dicing With Death" (2014) ===
On the 2014 Mother's Day celebrity special, one of the Bonus Catchphrases caused a very similar incident to 1994's "Snake Charmer" puzzle. The first piece revealed was of a hand moving up and down in a rapid motion near the person's waist, making it look like the person may have been masturbating. Like the aforementioned "Snake Charmer" incident, this caused the entire studio to break out in laughter as the picture was revealed in a similar manner.

=== "The Tail Wagging The Dog" (2019) ===
On another celebrity edition featuring the Bonus Catchphrase, which was originally broadcast on 12 January 2019 on ITV, the first selected square revealed an animation of a dog's head shaking very vigorously with a large grin on its face and hanging in the air. This caused the same reaction for the audience of this episode while the contestants and host Stephen Mulhern grimaced at this picture as it was revealed in a very humorous looking sort of way.

== Theme music ==
Catchphrase's original theme tune and incidental music were composed by television composer Ed Welch, whose original version of the theme was used for the TVS incarnation of the show, until 28 October 1994. It was also used on Family Catchphrase in 1994.

The show returned on 4 November 1994 with a brand new look and now being produced by Action Time for Carlton Television. The show's theme and incidental music was re-tuned, and was composed by Simon Etchell whose version was used from 1994 to 1999, with some slight alterations made in late 1998.

From 2000 to 2002, a third version of the Catchphrase theme music was used. It was a re-mixed and "jazzed-up" version of the previous theme, composed by Simon Etchell and rearranged by Tim Laws and was used alongside a revamped title sequence followed by a new studio set with animations designed by Sam Bailey with storyboards beginning with John Perkins, art directing by Loraine Marshall and question writing beginning with Mark Holloway and Laura Beaumont.

From 2013 onward, a fourth version was introduced, based on Ed Welch's original theme and composed by Marc Sylvan and Richard Jacques. A new title sequence, logo and studio set was also created for the series.

== Mr Chips & other mascots ==
The series' original mascot is a golden robot called "Mr Chips". The figure often appeared in the animations for the catchphrases. He was repurposed from the original US version of the programme where he was known as "Herbie".

As the animation styles used in the show changed throughout the year, the design of Mr Chips changed as well; eventually transitioning from a taller figure to becoming much smaller. Variations of the mascot sometimes appeared in the animations, such as Mr Chips with a lemon for a head (for the catchphrase "lemonheads").

After Nick Weir took over as presenter and the change of graphics, Mr Chips was semi-retired and replaced with the "Catchphrase Family", consisting of a father, mother, son and two other men. These characters were also featured in the opening sequence which showed the family trying to catch the letters of the word "Phrase" (essentially serving as a catchphrase for "Catchphrase" itself) ending with the family themselves becoming the letters of "Catch" above "Phrase". The family was not as popular as Mr Chips, but despite this, the family appeared until the series finished in 2002.

Mr Chips returned to appearing in the Catchphrases again throughout the series hosted by Mark Curry in 2002, as well as for the revival version hosted by Stephen Mulhern in 2013 where he is animated in 3D computer animation, as with the catchphrases themselves.

== See also ==
- Waffle (1998 game show hosted by Weir before his stint on Catchphrase that has been compared to Catchphrase)
