= Stephen Rhodes (radio presenter) =

Irish radio presenter Stephen Rhodes

- Born: Thomas Keenan; 1951; Dublin, Ireland
- Died: 20 February 2017 (aged 66); Eaton Bray, Bedfordshire, England
- Occupations: Radio personality, television host, independent candidate, voice-over
- Years active: 1970s–2017
- Children: 4

Stephen Rhodes (1951 – 20 February 2017) was a voice-over artist and weekday daytime presenter on BBC Three Counties Radio and BBC Radio Northampton. He originally hosted the Consumer Programme from 10 am until 1:30 pm, but moved to the breakfast show broadcast from 6 am to 9 am. However, after his breakfast show on Tuesday 16 March 2010, he handed his resignation in to the radio station and left with immediate effect, as he prepared to stand as an independent candidate at the 2010 general election.

Rhodes was born in Dublin as Thomas "Tommy" Keenan, the son of a dentist, but later moved to England. He changed his name to Stephen Rhodes when he started working on Dublin pirate radio stations. He died of motor neurone disease on 20 February 2017, aged 66, at home in Eaton Bray. He was survived by his wife and four children.

== Broadcasting career ==
He also wrote a column for the Luton News (newspaper).

=== Radio ===
Rhodes started his broadcasting career on Dublin pirate radio stations "ARD Radio" (Alternative Radio Dublin) and "Big D Radio" at the end of the 1970s, moving over to the UK and Birmingham radio station BRMB in 1980, before moving to Beacon Radio in Wolverhampton and then WABC (later called Classic Gold WABC) in the early 1990s. Rhodes then joined BBC Radio Shropshire as Breakfast Show host where he won the first of many Sony Radio Academy Awards. In early 1994, Rhodes took over the weekday mid-morning show on the station. He remained on the slot until mid 1995, when Rhodes turned up at BBC Three Counties Radio, presenting a consumer programme five days a week. In the course of his time on the consumer programme he became well known for his undercover work which won him a number of National Radio Academy Awards.

=== Television ===
Rhodes' television credits include presenting Central Weekend live on a number of occasions as well as presenting This Morning for Granada Television as relief presenter for Richard Madeley from 1994 to 1997. He was a presenter of the Politics Programme for the Eastern Region, BBC for four years. He has also presented occasional documentaries/reports for both BBC East and BBC London Television. He was the voice of Family Fortunes from 1987 to 1999.

== Sony Awards ==
- 1993 Speech based Breakfast Show – Bronze
- 1998 The Stephen Rhodes Show, Daytime Talk – Silver
- 1999 The Stephen Rhodes Consumer programme, Daytime Talk/News – Bronze
- 2001 Interactive – Gold
- 2001 Short Form Award – Bronze
- 2003 Speech Broadcaster of the year – Nominee
- 2005 Speech Broadcaster of the Year – Bronze

== Political career ==
Stephen Rhodes announced to the press on the afternoon of Tuesday 16 March 2010 that he had quit his radio presenter job to become an independent candidate for the Luton South parliamentary constituency in the general election, following the expenses controversies of the constituency's former MP Margaret Moran. He received 463 votes, 1.1% of those cast.
