= Mark Curry (British TV presenter) =

English actor and television and radio presenter

- Born: Mark Preston Curry; 27 August 1961 (age 65); Stafford, Staffordshire, England
- Occupations: Television presenter, actor
- Years active: 1969–present
- Television: Blue Peter (1986–1989), Catchphrase (2002)
- Spouse: Jeremy Sandle (m. 2008)
- Website: https://www.markpcurry.co.uk/

Mark Preston Curry (born 27 August 1961) is an English television presenter, actor and broadcaster. He is best known for his career on the British television children's show Blue Peter (1986–1989) as a presenter, as well as hosting ITV game show Catchphrase in 2002.

== Early years ==
Born in Stafford, Curry grew up in the mining village of Allerton Bywater near Castleford in the West Riding of Yorkshire. His father, Arthur, a physical training instructor and prison officer, died when Curry was five. His mother, Lily, was a maternity nurse.

== Career ==
Curry's entertainment career began at the age of seven, when he auditioned for Jess Yates, the executive producer of Yorkshire Television's Junior Showtime. Curry was a regular performer on the show from 1969 to 1974, and attended the Jean Pearce School of Dancing in Leeds throughout the early 1970s. He became a co-presenter of Junior Showtime alongside Kathryn Apanowicz. He was also a main character in a six-part comedy drama series about brass bands, Sounding Brass, for ATV.

In 1976, Curry appeared in the Alan Parker film Bugsy Malone, playing Oscar. He also performed in pantomimes and variety shows during this period. Curry did not enjoy school, and he found it to be an "annoying distraction" from performing.

Curry has appeared in many pantomimes throughout the UK. His first was a television pantomime in 1972, Babes in the Wood, starring Little and Large and Susan Maughan, in which Curry and Bonnie Langford were the two babes.

=== 1980–1989 ===
Curry joined the Harrogate Theatre Company and appeared in several plays over three years in the early 1980s. In 1981, he co-hosted the series Get Set For Summer on BBC1 with main hosts Peter Powell and Lucie Skeaping. The series returned the following year as Get Set, but eventually became The Saturday Picture Show with Curry as the main host, running until 1986. Curry's co-hosts over the years included Maggie Philbin and Cheryl Baker.

In 1984, Curry was the question master for the final series of the BBC children's quiz show Screen Test.

=== Blue Peter: 1986–1989 ===
On 23 June 1986, Curry moved to London to join the children's television programme Blue Peter replacing Simon Groom. Curry's co-hosts during his time with the programme were Janet Ellis, Peter Duncan, Caron Keating, Yvette Fielding and John Leslie.

=== 1990–1999 ===
Curry played the role of a TV host in a 1990 episode of the ITV drama London's Burning. He played one of the two leading roles in the London West End production of The Woman in Black in 1994, and starred in the centenary production of Charley's Aunt. Curry has also appeared in a UK tour of Noises Off and in the stage musical version of Singin' in the Rain. In addition, he has appeared at the Theatre Royal, Windsor in several Alan Ayckbourn plays.

Curry joined the BBC Radio 5 commentary team for their coverage of Wimbledon in the early 1990s. He is the regular Master of Ceremonies for the AEGON Classic, a pre-Wimbledon women's tennis tournament at the Priory Club, Edgbaston. He also presented BBC Radio 5's weekend breakfast programme Morning Edition from August 1992 until the network ended broadcasting on 27 March 1994.

=== 2000–2009 ===
==== Catchphrase (2002) ====
In 2002, Curry presented the final series of the original run of the television quiz show Catchphrase. The show was cancelled after this series, but revived in 2013 with Stephen Mulhern presenting the show.

=== 2010–present ===
From 9 January 2012, until the late summer of that year, Curry presented the breakfast radio show, Curry For Breakfast on Talk Radio Europe, an English language talk/variety network in southern Spain, where he has a home. He played a leading role in Wife Begins at Forty, for Ray Cooney at the Yvonne Arnaud Theatre, Guildford and the Mill, at Sonning in 2011 and 2012 and returned to Sonning in 2013 in the comedy, Who's Under Where?.

He has presented and performed in several BBC Children in Need television shows, once playing Cliff Richard in a Eurovision Song Contest tribute, singing "Congratulations" and "Power To All Our Friends".

Curry has also contributed to ITV's Piers Morgan's Life Stories, discussing his friendship with actress Beverley Callard.

He featured on the BBC One quiz show Pointless in December 2012 alongside Peter Duncan as contestants. He has also appeared as a guest on a celebrity edition of Antiques Roadshow, and won the BBC Children In Need Strictly Come Dancing special. From May to August 2014, Curry played Siegfried Farnon in the stage adaptation and UK tour of All Creatures Great and Small.

In 2016, Curry played the role of the Wizard in the West End musical Wicked.

== Personal life ==
Curry is a tennis player and a qualified tennis coach.

In September 2008, Curry formed a civil partnership with his long-term partner, Jeremy Sandle, a chartered surveyor. Curry was not openly gay while presenting Blue Peter in the 1980s as he feared that publicly revealing his sexuality would damage his career.
