= Chestnut Grove Academy =

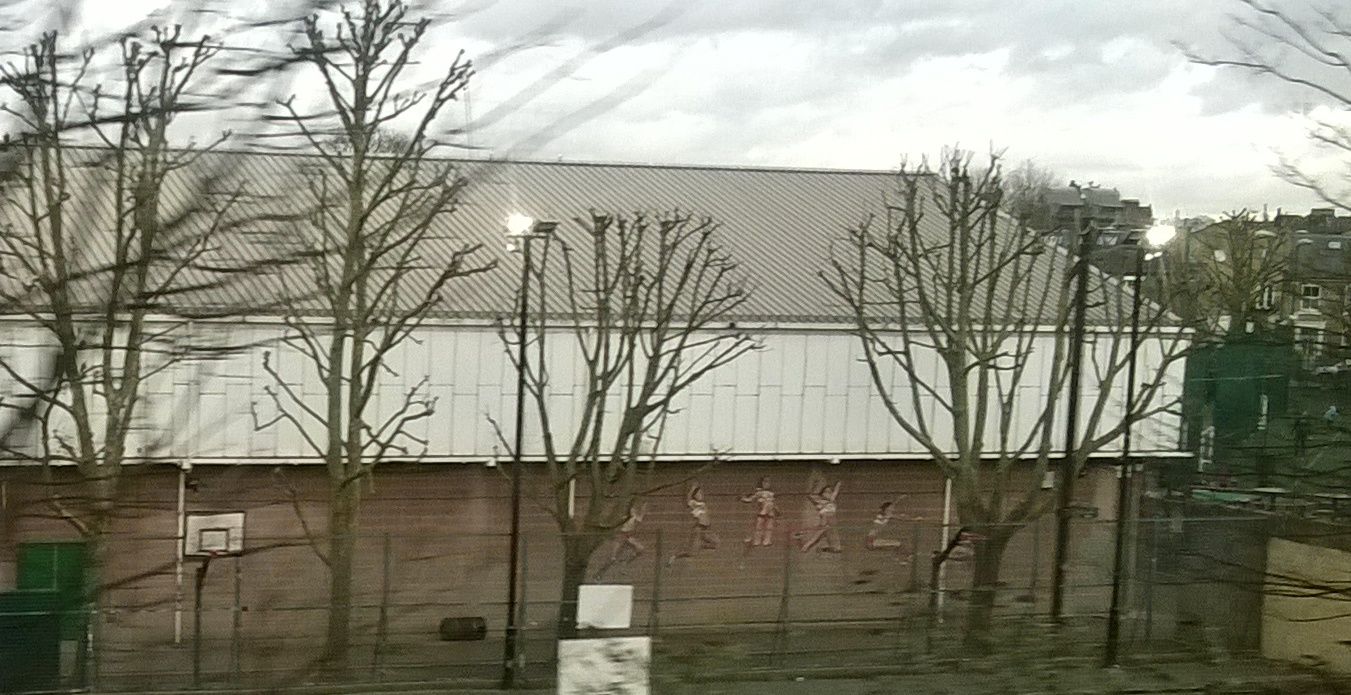
- A mural celebrating alumnus Jade Johnson

Location
- 45 Chestnut Grove, Balham; London, SW12 8JZ; England; 51°26′40″N 0°09′19″W

Information
- Former name: Chestnut Grove School
- Type: Academy
- Established: September 1986; 40 years ago
- Local authority: Wandsworth
- Trust: Wandle Learning Trust
- Specialist: Arts (visual arts)
- Department for Education URN: 136883 Tables
- Ofsted: Reports
- Head teacher: Christian Kingsley
- Gender: Mixed
- Age range: 11–19
- Enrolment: 1,327
- Capacity: 1,240
- Houses: Blake; Da Vinci; Hepworth; Kahlo; Kapoor; Turner; Kusama
- Website: www.chestnutgrove.wandsworth.sch.uk

Chestnut Grove Academy (often abbreviated as CGA) is an 11–19 mixed partially selective secondary school with academy and Visual Arts College status in Balham, London, England. In January 2019, Chestnut Grove was assessed in an OFSTED inspection report as good, whilst the Sixth Form was assessed as outstanding.

== History ==
Chestnut Grove Academy was formed as Chestnut Grove School in September 1986 by the amalgamation of Henry Thornton School (named for Henry Thornton) and Hydeburn School before achieving academy status in July 2011.

It selects 40% of its pupils for places based on aptitude in art and design or language. It was the first Arts College in the United Kingdom.

== Tutor Groups ==
Chestnut Grove's house system consists of 7 tutor groups: Blake, Da Vinci, Hepworth, Kahlo, Kapoor, Kusama, and Turner. Every year group is separated into these 7 tutor groups, each of which contains 30 students. Each tutor group has its own corresponding coloured tie:

- Blake - Green
- Da Vinci - Yellow
- Hepworth - Cobalt Blue
- Kahlo - Red
- Kapoor - Maroon
- Kusama - Violet
- Turner - Light Blue

The Kusama tutor group was introduced in September 2020 in order to meet the large numbers of new Year 7s. KS3 students were given the choice to vote on the name and corresponding tie colour of the tutor group.

== Sixth Form ==
Chestnut Grove's sixth form offers a range of subjects to study at A-level. It is open for application to both internal students (students that studied at Chestnut Grove), and external candidates (students that received their secondary education elsewhere). In January 2019, the Sixth Form was assessed as outstanding by OFSTED. An ungraded OFSTED inspection on 12 and 13 March 2024 left the school's overall judgement of "good".

The sixth form offers subjects that were not available to take at GCSE level, such as Film Studies, Government & Politics, Sociology, and Psychology. Students can also retake GCSEs during their sixth form course. The sixth form has minimum entry requirements of grade 6s at GCSE level for subjects that students want to further study at A-Level. For a student to graduate from year 12 to year 13, they must have attained minimum grades of two Es at AS level.

== High-Level Staff ==
- Mr C. Kingsley - Executive Headteacher / Co-CEO Wandle Learning Trust
- Ms V. Fabiani - Head of School
- Mr P. Hepworth - Deputy Headteacher
- Ms C. Robinson - Deputy Headteacher
- Ms L. Vanstone - Deputy Headteacher
- Mr J. Wildman - Assistant Headteacher - Designated Safeguarding Lead

== Famous student alumni ==
- Adele, singer and songwriter
- Cadet, rapper
- Jade Johnson, retired track and field athlete
- Mark Osei-tutu (Neutrino) of Oxide & Neutrino
