= Westminster cemeteries scandal =

1987 British political scandal

The Westminster cemeteries scandal was a British political scandal which began in January 1987 when Westminster City Council (WCC) sold three cemeteries, three lodges, one flat, a crematorium and over 12 acres (4.9 ha) of prime development land in London for a total of 85 pence. The three cemeteries – Hanwell Cemetery (formerly City of Westminster Cemetery), East Finchley Cemetery (formerly St. Marylebone Cemetery) and Mill Hill Cemetery (formerly Paddington New Cemetery) – were sold for 5 pence each. Shortly before the sale was finalised, one building had been withdrawn from the lot – because the council had failed to secure the eviction of a cemetery keeper – so WCC also paid the purchaser £70,000 compensation.

== Order of the sale ==
The sale was ordered by Shirley Porter, the Conservative leader of WCC at the time, in order to save the annual maintenance costs of £422,000, with the upkeep of the cemeteries passing to the new owner. However, the deal had been handled with such incompetence by WCC that the maintenance agreement only applied to the immediate purchaser of the cemeteries and not to any subsequent owners; the cemeteries were re-sold by the purchaser for £1.25 million on the same day that he had acquired them. Without maintenance, the cemeteries soon became overgrown, headstones were vandalised, and they were frequented by drug addicts. The Cemeteries were restored and looked after by Cemetery Management Limited, a company founded by Barry Evans, a Chartered Surveyor, who brokered the eventual deal for WCC to buy back the cemeteries.

== Declaration that the sale was unlawful ==
In 1988, following a public outcry, the Local Government Ombudsman ruled that WCC had to buy back the graves, and in February 1990 the District Auditor ruled that the sale was unlawful. WCC bought back the graves in June 1992 at a cost of £4.25 million. They were unable to repurchase any of the unused land – which had been "sold on by property developers for housing at an enormous profit" – or the buildings, including the crematorium. When the cemeteries were eventually reacquired by WCC, part of the deal required them to award an annual maintenance contract back to a company with connections to the seller.

Peter Bradley, the deputy Leader of the Labour Group at Westminster Council, said:

Shirley Porter will go down in history as the woman who sold three council cemeteries for five pence each and David Weeks will go down in history as the man who bought them back for £4.25 million.

== See also ==
- Homes for votes scandal
- Shirleymander
