= Gregory Evans (dramatist) =

Gregory Evans is a British television scriptwriter, playwright and radio dramatist. He has also written short stories, features and reviews for journals such as Harpers & Queen, Woman's Journal, The Observer and The Guardian online, and worked as a film critic for Harper's. He has published a book for young children, Owl in the House. His stage adaptation of H. E. Bates's novel Fair Stood the Wind for France was produced at the Royal Theatre (Northampton). His tragi-comedy Shirleymander, inspired by Andrew Hosken's book Nothing Like a Dame, was staged at the newly opened Playground Theatre in West London in May and June 2018. It was directed by Anthony Biggs and starred Jessica Martin and Jack Klaff.

For BBC Radio 4 he has written original plays (such as The Polish Soldier, Ghosting, Shirleymander, Art & Gadg) and a returning drama series based on his own family history titled Blood and Milk. He has also written radio dramatisations of novels by authors as diverse as Joseph Roth (The Radetzky March) and Graham Greene, Edgar Allan Poe (The Gold Bug) and Stephen King (including Pet Sematary and Salem's Lot), Jules Verne and Ray Bradbury (Fahrenheit 451).

His television drama includes scripts for The Bill, Casualty, Murder in Mind and Bugs; also the BBC docu-drama The Sewer King for the BBC History series Seven Wonders of the Industrial World and Window of Vulnerability in the BBC-2 series Debut on Two.

Gregory Evans was born in Bath, Somerset, and studied English and Philosophy at the University of Sheffield.
