= Ken: The Ups and Downs of Ken Livingstone =

Biographical publication

- Author: Andrew Hosken
- Language: English
- Subject: Ken Livingstone
- Genre: Non-fiction, Biography
- Publisher: Arcadia Books
- Publication date: 8 April 2008
- Publication place: United Kingdom
- Media type: Print (hardcover & paperback)
- Pages: x, 435 (first edition)
- ISBN: 9781905147724
- OCLC: 254236065
- Preceded by: Nothing Like a Dame

Ken: The Ups and Downs of Ken Livingstone is a 2008 biography of Ken Livingstone by British journalist and author Andrew Hosken. First published on 8 April 2008, the book's provisional title had been Ken: The Fall and Rise of Ken Livingstone.

The unauthorised biography, based on 30 hours of interviews with Livingstone, revealed that he had five children by three different women, previously unknown by the general public. The story was broken by the BBC just prior to publication of the book. Livingstone responded: "I don't think anybody in this city is shocked about what consenting adults do. As long as you don't involve children, animals and vegetables, they leave you to get on and live their own life in their own way. What happens in my private life is a matter solely for me and the people that share my private life."

Following the leak of the book's "major scoop" Arcadia Books was forced to bring forward publication (originally planned for 22 April 2008) and ordered an immediate reprint in expectation of "saturation press coverage" in the run up to the 1 May 2008 mayoral election in which Livingstone was standing against Boris Johnson and Brian Paddick. Livingstone nevertheless attended the book's launch party at Foyles bookshop in Charing Cross Road, London, and said: "I gave Andrew Hosken 30 hours of time for interviews because I felt it was part of the accountability process. I think it was a fair account given Andrew's political stance."

The book additionally discussed Livingstone's links to Gerry Healy, an extreme Left-winger and leader of the Workers Revolutionary Party, and published documents alleging that Healy had received funding from Libyan dictator Muammar Gaddafi and Saddam Hussein. Healy was responsible for printing the Labour Herald, edited by Livingstone and former Lambeth Borough Council leader Ted Knight in the 1980s. Livingstone told Hosken he "could not remember whether he ever asked [Healy] if he had taken money from regimes such as Libya but stressed he had not been aware of such links and had never personally accepted such funds."

Hosken also noted that David Miliband, then Secretary of State for Foreign and Commonwealth Affairs, had "airbrushed" his association with Livingstone from his CV. Miliband had worked as a Greater London Council (GLC) management trainee under Livingstone's leadership but no longer mentions this in his official CV or his Who's Who entry, "despite the (seemingly) less important entries showing his support for Arsenal and South Shields FC."

== Reception ==
The book received mixed reviews. Ed Howker, for The Daily Telegraph, characterised Livingstone's political career as "a riddle" but said Hosken's "exhaustive" work "performed the admirable task of explaining how [Livingstone's] seemingly incongruous behaviour is designed to satisfy a singular objective: holding on to political power." The book "unmasked" Livingstone, he said, "as one of the very best career politicians of our times: a popular celebrity, a great orator and a ruthless strategist." Howker observed that "in order to tell his tale, [Hosken] is obliged to take his unfortunate readers through a history of Britain's far Left. In short: there are lots of Trots... It is testament to Hosken's skills that he is able to guide his reader through the often absurd underbelly of the Left and still create a ripping yarn."

Simon Jenkins, for The Sunday Times, was not impressed by the book, in which, he said, Hosken "appears alternately mesmerised and appalled by his subject, honouring Neil Kinnock's maxim that the only people who like Livingstone are those who don't know him." Jenkins felt the biography did not offer "a sophisticated analysis of Livingstone as mayor... It vaguely classifies the mayor's deeds as successes and failures, betraying its bias in regarding as successes anything involving reckless extravagance... There is not much new in this book. The details of his left-wing allies, partners and children were known – and I think he is entitled to privacy over the last."

Andrew Gilligan, for the London Evening Standard, called the book "generally very good" but observed that for contemporary readers it focused too much on Livingstone's career at the GLC and not enough on his time as Mayor of London. Gilligan said that it was:

fascinating, for an anorak like me, to relive the GLC years, with their radical "wimmin" (they really did wear boiler suits and boots, Hosken confirms) and their bad poetry on the rates ("Today, two million pricks/Are riding, meek as lapdogs/The motorways One to Six".) It is illuminating to realise how far many practices of the new-model Livingstone – the abuse of public money to manipulate client groups, the gesture politics to conceal a lack of substantial real powers – are directly inherited from the GLC... But there is too much GLC in the book, and not enough mayoralty.

Despite this shortcoming, Gilligan said: "After his superb exposé of Shirley Porter, the gerrymanderer of Westminster City council, Hosken has again managed to turn unpromising territory into a corking read. He is the John Grisham of local government."

John Carvel, for The Guardian, "[admired] the painstaking research that Hosken has undertaken. His 340 pages are referenced by 1,749 footnotes, and the content provides plenty of evidence that his investigations were not confined to the cuttings library." He considered Livingstone a problematic subject for a biography, saying: "[Livingstone] is a well-worked journalistic seam and there may not have been many nuggets left to find" but commended Hosken for uncovering the details of the previously unknown children. Gilligan was also impressed by Hosken's writing about "Livingstone's political promiscuity – notably a series of relationships with Trotskyist sects... which provided him with footsoldiers in a series of grassroots political struggles" and his "unearthing" of "a shedload of documents from Socialist Action, whose tiny band of supporters included five highly placed mayoral advisers."

Leo McKinstry, for The Spectator, wrote:

BBC reporter Andrew Hosken has certainly done a thorough job, conducting over 200 interviews for the book and mastering the alphabet soup of hard-Left-wing sectarian politics in London. His labours have unearthed some intriguing material, including the revelation that Livingstone has fathered five children by three different women... More disturbing is the account of Livingstone's long-term involvement with the loathsome Workers Revolutionary Party, whose leader Gerry Healy was a vile demagogue, bully, liar, rapist, drunk and fraudster. Through diligent research, Hosken provides damning evidence that Livingstone's radical newsletter of the early Eighties, Labour Herald, was printed by the WRP when the group was bankrolled by the Libyan regime of Colonel Gadaffi... But such revelations cannot disguise the somewhat pedestrian tone of the book.

McKinstry was critical that while Hosken "dutifully covers all the important episodes of Livingstone's story" it did so "without much verve or vibrancy". He noted that: "For a biography of a character as explosive as Livingstone, there are surprisingly few juicy anecdotes, hardly anything, for instance, about his renowned fondness for the bedroom or the drinks cabinet. Throughout the text, there is a sense of punches being pulled, perhaps because the author felt inhibited by the fulsome co-operation that Livingstone gave him. At times, Hosken seems far too generous. He frequently describes Livingstone as 'sensitive', though what he really means is that Livingstone is prickly and egocentric". He concluded that: "Hosken once wrote a magnificent book about one of Ken Livingstone's political rivals, Dame Shirley Porter, the former leader of Westminster City Council. Sadly, this effort is only a pale successor".

Martin Bright, for The Observer, called the book a "monumental work" and said:

The Livingstone portrayed in this impressively detailed and well-researched biography is a sometimes heroic figure: taking on the Thatcher government to fight the abolition of the Greater London Council, or standing up to the might of the Labour spin machine to win the 2000 mayoral election as an independent. But more often he cuts a rather lonely profile: shuffling around friendless in the House of Commons after he was elected in 1987, for example... Hosken, a senior reporter on the Today programme, is scrupulously fair to his subject, for whom he clearly has considerable respect. There is a sadness that permeates Hosken's Livingstone, from the weedy, newt-fancying schoolboy who lost his father too early to a heart attack, through to the tired and washed-up Mayor of latter days surrounded by a group of increasingly dysfunctional courtiers. Even the cover photo of an ageing Livingstone evokes pity rather than awe.
