= Westminster City Council v Duke of Westminster =

- Court: High Court of Justice of England and Wales, Chancery Division
- Full case name: Westminster City Council v Duke of Westminster and Others
- Decided: 26 November 1990
- Citation: [1991] 4 All ER 136

Case history
- Prior action: Ruling of Lands Tribunal (unreported)
- Appealed to: Court of Appeal of England and Wales
- Subsequent action: [1992] 24 HLR 572 CA (Civ Div) reversal in part on another ground

Case opinions
- Decision by: Mr Justice Harman

Keywords
- positive covenants; restrictive covenants; obsolescence; rule against perpetuities; Whether consideration for headleases past

Westminster City Council v Duke of Westminster was a case between Westminster City Council and the 6th Duke of Westminster (and fellow family trust co-trustees) heard in November 1990. The dispute concerned 532 flats in Page Street, Vincent Street and Regency Street, Pimlico, London. These had been designed by architect Sir Edwin Lutyens and erected between 1928 and 1930 for the 2nd Duke and the other family trustees. In 1937, the trustees leased them (for a peppercorn rent of 1 shilling) to the council on a 999-year lease containing the stipulation that they be used only as "dwellings for the working classes... and no other purpose."

In 1990, the Council argued that the term "working class" was now meaningless and that the stipulation should be overturned, allowing them to sell the leaseholds of the flats to anyone, against the Duke's wishes. The Duke maintained that the properties should remain available as low-rent accommodation for those who could not afford to purchase long leaseholds. His freehold interest means the Duke can charge for extensions and structural alterations. If a majority of a block becomes privately owned that majority can pay for and cease his future such rights: via collective enfranchisement. The case was dubbed Westminster v Westminster by the media. The High Court of Justice of England and Wales ruled in favour of the Duke.

== Background ==
=== 'Building Stable Communities' policy ===
Local Conservatives formed a reduced majority of 4 on Westminster City Council in the 1986 local council elections. The area split roughly into thirds by ward result: strong Labour, strong Tory and marginal-majority two- or three- councillor wards. Following this and fearing her fellow members would lose control unless there was a radical change in the social composition of the borough, council leader Shirley Porter instituted a secret policy known as 'Building Stable Communities' (BSC), focusing on eight marginal wards where the Conservatives wished to gain votes at the 1990 local council elections. An important part of this policy was the slow renovation and designation of much of Westminster's council housing for open market sale, rather than re-letting whenever a short term tenancy became vacant. The designated housing was concentrated in those wards most likely to change hands to Labour in the elections and the policy was intended to force people on low incomes - perceived to be likely Labour supporters - out of the area by disposing of social housing. The council expected that this would result in more owner-occupiers, rather than renters, "a pattern of tenure which is more likely to translate into Conservative votes."

=== Grosvenor Estate ===
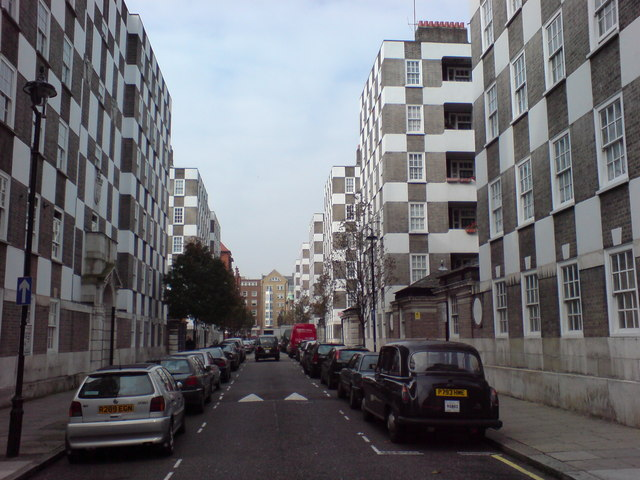
Page Street, Pimlico. The flats designed by Lutyens featured a distinctive 'checkerboard' façade.

The properties, collectively known as the Grosvenor Estate, had been built in Pimlico on the instructions of the 2nd Duke of Westminster, who owned the land. Demolished housing on the site had been "dilapidated", prone to flooding and the "densely populated slum" was demolished in 1928 after being condemned by the Westminster Medical Officer of Health. Lutyens, who has been described as "arguably the greatest architect the country has produced", was at the time working as a consultant architect for the nearby Grosvenor House and was asked by the Duke to design new housing for workers on Page Street, Vincent Street and Regency Street.

In 1937, the duke and his family trustees granted leases of the 532 flats to Westminster council for 999 years (retaining the freehold) containing the condition that the flats be used as "dwellings for the working classes... and no other purpose."

As part of Porter's policy (later found illegal), the flats, being in swing wards, were selected for Designated Sales. Since 1988 this had enabled anyone working in the City of Westminster to purchase such council homes, generally leasehold, when vacant, at 30% of their true market value. A Home Ownership Centre (operated by estate agents Ellis & Co.) had been opened by the council in Victoria, London to facilitate the sales, described by BBC journalist Hosken as "the council's great machine of social engineering...that would sell thousands of council [homes] to prospective Tory voters." That is, at an unusually generous discount to any local person who could afford them. The council claimed that this would enable first-time buyers and middle-income families to settle in Westminster. The new leases it granted contained a very brief recouping mechanism on resale prices thus "the council's housing stock was wide open to property speculators looking for a quick profit by buying up a council flat at a huge discount and then selling a few years later at full market value." Challenged at the time by Labour councillors, who were just beginning to unravel the conspiracy behind BSC, the council flatly denied that the designated sales were intended "to change the balance of the electorate in marginal wards, or indeed that purchasers were anything other than 'working class'."

== Hearing ==
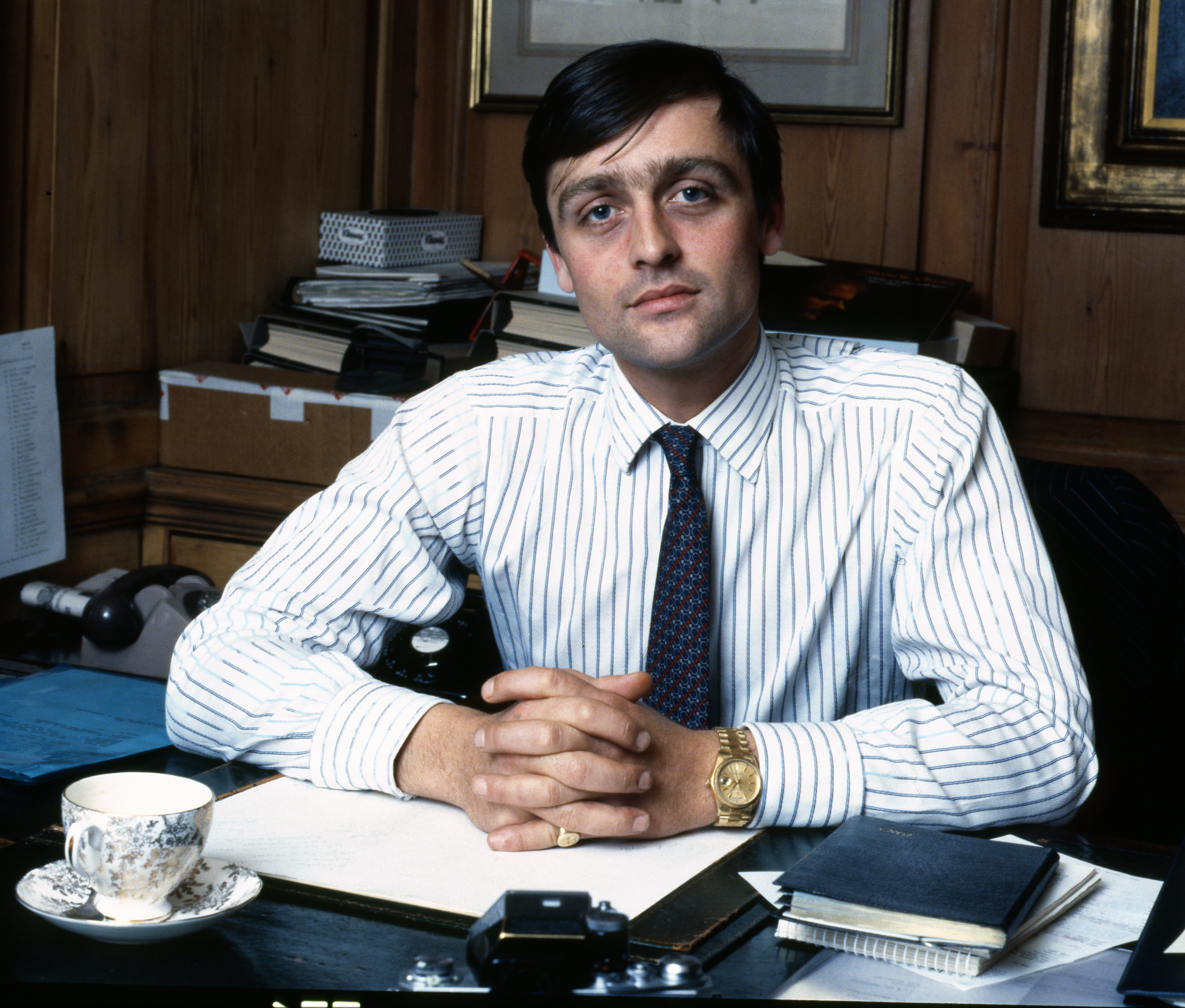
Gerald Grosvenor, 6th Duke of Westminster, in 1988

The case was brought by Westminster City Council after Gerald Grosvenor, 6th Duke of Westminster, who at the time the wealthiest man in Britain, refused to withdraw the clause in the lease. As a compromise he would agree to 10% of the properties being offered for sale provided that the remainder were kept as low-rent accommodation, but this was rejected by the council. The council asked that the court set aside the stipulation on the grounds that the term "working classes" had "no meaning in contemporary society." Part of the council's case rested on a precedent set in Guinness Trust (London Fund) Founded 1890, Registered 1902 v Green [1955] in which the Court of Appeal had "unanimously ruled that the working class in Britain had been abolished."

The case was heard before Mr Justice Harman at the High Court of Justice of England and Wales, Chancery Division, over 3 days in November 1990. John Colyer, QC, for the council, told the court: "As of today, the phrase 'dwellings for the working classes', whatever it meant in 1925 or 1937, has fallen out of the legislation."

=== Judgment ===
Judgment was passed in the Duke's favour on 26 November 1990. Mr Justice Harman ruled that the clause was "as valid today as when it was made" and that there was no evidence that the term "working class" was now obsolete. He also said that it was "unbecoming for the council to 'blow hot and cold' and seek now to set aside the terms under which it had accepted the second duke's generosity in 1937." Westminster City Council were, he said, under a continuing obligation to house the working class in Pimlico and could not sell the flats to anyone other than sitting tenants.

On a separate issue it was held: where a contract to erect buildings on land and to grant a lease of that land are substantially one transaction (as by the 2nd Duke), the expenditure of money on the buildings would not be past consideration (therefore doubtful) for the execution of the lease, even though the lease was not executed until on or after completion of the buildings.

== Reactions ==
During the hearings the Sunday Correspondent newspaper offered a prize of a crate of brown ale for the best definition of 'working class'. The winning entry was: "Wearing overalls on weekdays, painting somebody else's house to earn money? You're working class. Wearing overalls at weekends, painting your own house to save money? You're middle class."

Dennis Skinner for Bolsover (Lab), said: "There is still a working class. It's exploited every day by people with fancy names such as entrepreneur." His neighbouring MP Joe Ashton for Bassetlaw (Lab), said: "The Lady Porters will always need the working classes to clean up after them. It shows that nobs [slang: nobility] like the Duke know more about how the world ticks than the heiress to a Tesco fortune." Charles Irving for Cheltenham (Con), disagreed with: "We are all working class... Even the rich have to work."

Ex-barrister John Mortimer, playwright and screenwriter of Rumpole of the Bailey quipped that Margaret Thatcher "had already abolished the working class and that these days, people [are] either 'middle-class or sleeping in a cardboard box.'"

The ex-Council leader said: "In a week when the son of a trapeze artist [John Major] has been battling to become [Conservative] Prime Minister... the courts have ruled that we must remain wedded to an outdated class system." Peter Bradley, then the deputy Leader of the Labour Group at Westminster Council, responded:

[Porter] says that the council's housing policies are intended "to enable less well-off families to become better off." She makes no mention of those Westminster people who are forced to raise their families in inadequate housing or, worse still, have become homeless as a direct consequence of her politically motivated depletion of the council's housing stock."

In May 1996, after long investigations, the District Auditor concluded that the 'Building Stable Communities' policy had been illegal.

== See also ==
Regarding the secret, politicised underlying housing policy of the city: Porter v Magill [2002] 2 AC 357

- Belcher v Reading Corporation [1950] Ch 380, obiter dictum of Megarry VC applied
- Re Niyazi’s Will Trusts [1978] 1 WLR 910, obiter dictum of Romer J applied
