= Porter v Magill =

UK administrative law case

- Court: House of Lords
- Decided: 13 December 2001
- Citation: [2001] UKHL 67

Court membership
- Judges sitting: Lord Bingham of Cornhill, Lord Steyn, Lord Hope of Craighead, Lord Hobhouse of Wood-borough, Lord Scott of Foscote

Porter v Magill [2001] UKHL 67 is a UK administrative law case decided by the House of Lords which arose out of the Homes for votes scandal involving Dame Shirley Porter.

Under English law, the test for establishing bias was set out in Porter v Magill – whether a "fair minded and informed observer", having considered the facts, would conclude that there was a "real possibility" of bias.

== Facts ==
The Conservative majority of Westminster Council adopted a policy to sell council houses in parts of the City where it was believed that home owners were more likely to vote Conservative. It became known as "the homes for votes scandal", involving Shirley Porter. As the leader of Westminster City Council, she helped formulate a policy which appeared to be designed to sell off the council housing at a lower price for the purpose of electoral advantage in marginal wards. The issue was, could the resulting investigation's decision be quashed where an initial press conference appeared to be biased.

== Judgment ==
The House of Lords accepted that councillors are elected. However, their powers can only be used for the purposes for which they are conferred, and not for the electoral advantage of a political party. Also the new (and final) test of bias was introduced:

Would the fair-minded and informed observer conclude that there was a real possibility of bias?

== See also ==
- UK administrative law
- Judicial review in English law
