= Nothing Like a Dame =

Biography written by Andrew Hosken

- Author: Andrew Hosken
- Language: English
- Subject: Shirley Porter
- Genre: Non-fiction, Biography
- Publisher: Granta Books
- Publication date: 1 October 2006
- Publication place: United Kingdom
- Media type: Print (hardcover & paperback)
- Pages: xii, 372 (first edition)
- ISBN: 9781862078093
- OCLC: 62479273
- Followed by: Ken: The Ups and Downs of Ken Livingstone

Nothing Like a Dame: The Scandals of Shirley Porter is a 2006 biography by British journalist Andrew Hosken. The book was first published on 1 October 2006 through Granta UK and discusses British politician Shirley Porter's time served as a member of the Westminster City Council.

== Synopsis ==
The book discusses Porter's time served under the Westminster City Council and the resulting fallout. Hosken also includes several interviews and looks into Porter's history as the daughter of Jack Cohen.

== Reception ==
The Guardian gave a positive review for Nothing Like A Dame, calling it "enthralling". Bloomberg gave a more mixed review, remarking that it was "riveting" but also "uneven". In contrast, The Contemporary Review praised Hosken's research. Jay Rayner, reviewing for The Observer, felt that the book was: "probably as comprehensive an account of Porter's time in power, and the bullying, plotting, maladministration and corruption that went with it, as we are likely to get." Francis Beckett described it as: "a splendid book, as easy to read as a good thriller... It's also very thorough, with an immense amount of detail, presented remarkably digestibly."

Christian Wolmar wrote that the book: "tells the story brilliantly, often with greatly enlightening and entertaining detail, and breaking up the chronology to deal with the various individual scandals which individually are shocking enough but together suggest that the very basis of the administration was corrupt." On the negative side, Wolmar was critical of the lack of references, "a result of the publisher seeking to keep it to a manageable length but hopefully an omission that will be remedied in the paperback version as this is a subject ripe for future generations to study as a classic failure of governance."

=== Cover ===
The cover of the book consists of a photograph of Porter which she had posed for use in a feature article about her in The Sunday Times. Jenny Diski, for the London Review of Books, was, however, critical of the cover, writing:

...the picture on the front of Hosken's book is of Porter as a racial caricature. Bright lumps of gold adorn her ears and finger, brass buttons decorate her blazer, a gold smiley-face pendant hangs round her neck, the most garish of orange lipstick outlines her lips, her arms are arrogantly akimbo, her less than gracile facial features perform an ugly, over-bronzed sneer of contempt. She is outsized against the background, looming over London, the curse of the 50-foot woman, lording it over and diminishing the Houses of Parliament and the City: common as muck and in control. Call me oversensitive, but she's not just dreadful, she's so Jewish.

Nicholas Lezard, for The Guardian, countered:

To get to the substance of the book you are going to have to surmount the considerable obstacle of its front cover. Diski calls this a "racial caricature", but it's not, it's a photograph, of Porter in her prime: the contemptuous stare, the alarming lipstick, the shoulder-pads.

Lezard was also dismissive of Diski's "[detection of] a trace of anti-semitism in patrician attitudes to Porter," calling it "understandable, but to which one reasonable counter-claim might be that it didn't stop her from becoming leader of Westminster council."

== Radio play ==
In December 2009 BBC Radio 4 broadcast a Friday Play, described as a "tragic comedy", based upon Hosken's book. The radio play, Shirleymander, was written by Gregory Evans, directed by Marc Beeby and starred Tracy-Ann Oberman as Shirley Porter. Reception for the radio drama was positive, with The Daily Telegraph praising Beeby for his casting and choice of music.

== Early day motion ==
The book was the subject of an early day motion tabled in the House of Commons on 20 April 2006 "[congratulating] BBC Today reporter Andy Hosken on his book, Nothing Like a Dame, recounting the story of Dame Shirley Porter's regime at Westminster City Council...." The motion went on to "[call] upon the Government to recommend to Her Majesty the Queen, that the honour of [Porter's] DBE should be withdrawn, it having been awarded under false pretences, and representing an affront to those whose public service genuinely merits such recognition."

== See also ==
- Homes for votes scandal
- Westminster cemeteries scandal
