= Shirleymander =

2009 radio comedy drama

- Genre: Radio comedy drama
- Running time: 58 minutes
- Country of origin: United Kingdom
- Language: English
- Home station: BBC Radio 4
- Starring: Tracy-Ann Oberman; Maggie Steed; Bruce Alexander
- Written by: Gregory Evans
- Directed by: Marc Beeby
- No. of series: 1
- No. of episodes: 1
- Audio format: Stereophonic sound
- Opening theme: "My Heart Belongs to Daddy"
- Ending theme: "My Heart Belongs to Daddy"

Shirleymander is a radio comedy drama written by Gregory Evans. It was inspired by Today journalist Andrew Hosken's book Nothing Like a Dame (2006). Shirleymander was first broadcast as the Friday Play by BBC Radio 4 on 27 November 2009. The play's title is a portmanteau referencing the gerrymandering policy adopted by Shirley Porter while leader of Westminster City Council in the 1980s which "forced homeless families to substandard housing in order to manipulate the borough's voting demographic."

Shirleymander dramatises Porter's time as leader of the council and the scandals that ensued around the illegal homes for votes policy and the sale of 3 cemeteries for 5 pence each. Porter is depicted as "vain, arrogant, bullying and desperate to keep the borough from falling into the hands of her arch-enemies, the socialists." Evans said of his play:

I haven't invented stuff, I haven't needed to. The material in Andrew's book was all carefully researched. The problem is that there is too much and so I have to leave a lot out... I know she is litigious or used to be but I am not making any new allegations in the play.

Maureen Lipman and Imelda Staunton had both been linked with the lead role, which was eventually awarded to Tracy-Ann Oberman. Of her portrayal of Porter, Oberman said:

When I first read the script I couldn't believe that she really did all these dreadful things. I had to be assured that the play was based on fact, not fiction. I actually tried to portray her with a human dimension, but when I spoke to people who knew her from her City Hall days they said I shouldn't bother, as they recalled she didn't have one. I then worked out that Shirley was one of those people who will always see themselves as the victims.

== Cast ==
- Leader (Shirley Porter) - Tracy Ann Oberman
- Wet - Maggie Steed
- Senior Council official - Joseph Cohen-Cole
- Executive Director - Piers Wehner
- Deputy - Stephen Hogan
- The Doctor - Sagar Arya
- District Auditor - Bruce Alexander
- QC, Father - Ewan Hooper
- Chairman, Tesco - Philip Fox
- Labour Councillor - John Biggins
- Female interviewer - Tessa Nicholson

== Reception ==
The play received positive reviews. The Times wrote: "Oberman has the time of her life chewing up the scenery in this frequently grotesque comedy drama...Gregory Evans has woven an atmosphere of poisonous paranoia, stocked with rabid right-wingers, sycophants and the occasional caring Conservative. Excellent fun." Moira Petty, writing in The Stage, also commended Evans for his recreation of the culture of fear that had pervaded the council: "What this drama did extraordinarily well was to conjure up an atmosphere of dread, suspicion and subservience which allowed her reign of terror to flourish. The corridors of Westminster Council were littered with the neurotic, chain-smoking remnants of those officers who hadn't fled."

Gillian Reynolds, for The Daily Telegraph, observed that the play "avoided front-parlour-back-room realism and went instead for a series of aural sketches (Shirley shouting, Shirley not understanding, people avoiding Shirley, people telling Shirley she was wrong, Shirley invincibly convinced she was right), which fell together into a brutally comic, unexpectedly sad composite portrait." Of Oberman's performance, Reynolds wrote: "It's a thoughtful sketch of a woman in power, how she came to it, what she did with it, beautifully acted by Tracy-Ann Oberman."

Paul Donovan, for The Sunday Times, called the play "taut, vicious, gripping" and felt that the character of Porter emerged "as an immensely strong, charismatic woman surrounded by jellyfish."

== Stage adaptation ==
In 2018, a stage play adapted from the radio drama opened at the Playground Theatre in west London, where the production ran for several weeks. It starred Jessica Martin as Porter.
