= Homes for votes scandal =

British political scandal

The homes for votes scandal was a gerrymandering controversy involving the Conservative-led Westminster City Council in London. Having narrowly maintained their control of the council in the 1986 local elections, Conservative councillors initiated a programme of selling off council homes in eight marginal wards, in the belief that owner-occupiers were more likely to vote Conservative than council tenants. Hostels in the marginal wards were closed, with some homeless people moved into condemned accommodation. The policy came to an end after it was exposed on the BBC current affairs programme Panorama in 1989. On investigation, the policy was ruled to be illegal. Former leader of the Council Dame Shirley Porter was found liable for wilful misconduct and ordered to repay £36.1m. She eventually settled with the council for a sum of £12.3 million.

== Background ==
The Conservatives were narrowly re-elected to Westminster City Council in the 1986 local council elections, with their majority reduced from 26 to 4. The Conservatives in total only held on to control of the council by 106 votes after Labour failed to gain the marginal Cavendish Ward which was needed to give Labour the majority to take control of the council. Following the election and fearing that they would eventually lose control unless there was a permanent change in the social composition of the borough, council leader Shirley Porter and a small group of committee chairmen instituted a policy known as building stable communities, focusing on eight marginal wards where the Conservatives wished to gain votes at the 1990 local council elections.

== Implementation of the policy ==
Eight wards became 'key wards', selected for having been the most marginal in the local election of 1986. Bayswater, Little Venice and Millbank had been narrowly won by Labour. St. James's, Victoria and Cavendish narrowly returned Conservatives. West End returned one non-Tory, an Independent. Hamilton Terrace saw its Conservative councillors electorally squeezed by the SDP. In the key wards the aim was to sell 250 council homes a year at discounted prices, rather than re-letting them when they became vacant. It was hoped that these designated sales would give the Conservatives an electoral advantage in the next local elections, as owner-occupiers were considered more likely to vote Conservative than tenants.

A second semi-secretive strategy was the removal of homeless voters and others who lived in hostels and were perceived as less likely to vote Conservative, such as students and nurses, from Westminster. While this initially proved successful, other councils in London and the Home Counties soon became aware of homeless individuals and families from Westminster, many with complex mental health and addiction problems, making an unusual proportion of calls on services in their area. In public, the Council claimed areas and the whole borough was subject to 'stress factors' in the economy leading to a fall in population, locally and overall in the City of Westminster.

Based on the unfair political considerations, these eight wards took priority in high-visibility services for four years before the 1990 whole-council elections: from street cleaning, pavement repair to planting and environmental improvements.

As Westminster City Council found it more difficult to move homeless people outside Westminster so a revised scheme of the programme strongly favoured the rehousing of the homeless into any of the politically safe wards. In 1989 over 100 homeless families were removed from hostels in marginal wards and placed in the Hermes and Chantry Point tower blocks in the safe Labour ward of Harrow Road. These blocks were "riddled" with asbestos, and should have either been cleaned up or demolished a decade before, but had somehow remained in place due to funding disputes between the council and the former Greater London Council. The heating and sanitation systems in many of the flats had been destroyed by the council to deter their use as drug dens and others had pigeons making nests out of exposed asbestos-containing fibres. Despite a range of preventative measures some had been taken over by heroin users.

== Investigation ==
Both the decision to increase the number of designated sales and the selection of the properties designated for sale were influenced by an irrelevant consideration, namely the electoral advantage of the majority party. I have found that the electoral advantage of the majority party was the driving force behind the policy of increased designated sales and that that consideration was the predominant consideration which influenced both the decision to increase designated sales by 500 per annum and the selection of properties designated for sale. My view is that the Council was engaged in gerrymandering, which I have found is a disgraceful and improper purpose, and not a purpose for which a local authority may act.

— John Magill, District Auditor in his 1996 report

In July 1989 the BBC current affairs programme Panorama devoted an episode to the designated sales policy. Labour councillors and members of the public raised objections about the building stable communities policy with John Magill (the Audit Commission's District Auditor). Porter and her collaborators abandoned the policy and turned their attention to covering their tracks.

In 1990, the Conservatives were re-elected by a landslide victory in Westminster, increasing their majority from 4 to 38. They won all but one of the wards targeted by the building stable communities policy. Porter stood down as Leader of the Council in 1991, and served as Lord Mayor of Westminster in 1991–2. She resigned from the council in 1993, and retired to live in Israel with her husband.

On 26 January 1994, Dr. Michael Dutt, joint chairman of Westminster's housing committee between 1988 and 1990 and one of ten councillors facing the surcharge, was found dead from a self-inflicted gunshot wound in his St Albans home, with papers from the investigation by his side.

=== Legal action ===
In May 1996, after lengthy investigations, the District Auditor concluded that the building stable communities policy had been illegal. He found ex-leader Dame Shirley Porter liable for "wilful misconduct" and "disgraceful and improper gerrymandering". Magill ordered Porter, her deputy David Weeks, one other councillor and three council officials "jointly and severally" liable for repaying £36.1m.

The District Auditor's judgement was upheld by the High Court in 1997 with liability reduced solely to Porter and Weeks. The Court of Appeal overturned the judgement in 1999, but the House of Lords reinstated it in 2001. Porter then submitted an appeal to the European Court of Human Rights; the appeal was ruled inadmissible in April 2003. In Israel, Porter transferred substantial parts of her great wealth to other members of her family and into secret trusts in an effort to avoid the charge, and subsequently claimed to have only £300,000 of assets.

On 24 April 2004, Westminster City Council and the Audit Commission announced that an agreement had been reached with Porter for a payment of £12.3 million in settlement. The decision was appealed by Labour members on the Council and District Auditor Les Kidner began another investigation. The ensuing report, issued in March 2007, accepted the position of the council that further action would not be cost effective and stated that "'Overall, the council acted reasonably in the recovery action that it took."

Following reports in 2006 that Porter had bought a £1.5m flat in Mayfair, the then Mayor of London, Ken Livingstone, asked Lord Goldsmith, the Attorney General, to commence an investigation into whether or not Porter committed perjury or other offences during the conduct of the homes for votes case.

=== Reaction from Westminster City Council ===
What she did was wrong, illegal, and we are unreservedly sorry. I personally want to make it absolutely clear I believe Shirley Porter and her policies did significant damage and it is a legacy I want to bury once and for all. Our policies today bear no relation to her regime. These are not just words, we are acting on this and I want people to judge us by our deeds, not history.

— Colin Barrow, leader of Westminster City Council, 27 November 2009

After publication of the District Auditor's final report in 2004, the then leader of Westminster City Council, Simon Milton, apologised for the council's past mistakes and said: "As a group we are determined those mistakes will never be repeated". Council chief executive Peter Rogers said: "The city council welcomes the fact that the appointed auditor's report contains no recommendations for the council and draws a line under the past".

In November 2009 in an interview with the Evening Standard on the day BBC Radio 4 was due to broadcast a play about the scandal, the council leader Colin Barrow apologised unreservedly to all those affected by the gerrymandering policy. He criticised Porter by name for the first time and added that her actions were "the opposite of the council's policies today".

== BBC Panorama investigations ==
The scandal was the subject of two investigations by BBC current affairs programme Panorama, broadcast on BBC One on 19 July 1989 and 16 May 1994. The 1994 programme was prepared and scheduled for transmission on 25 April 1994 – ahead of the local elections which took place on 5 May 1994, in the period of purdah. Conservative Central Office complained to the BBC and the programme was delayed until after the elections. A Conservative party spokesman denied that they were attempting to censor the BBC and said: "We did point out to the BBC that it seemed curious to us that a programme about a particular London borough is put out 10 days before polling day when London only votes once every four years. We understood it looked into a Conservative borough and not any Labour or Liberal Democrat boroughs." Peter Bradley, the deputy Leader of the Labour opposition on Westminster council, said: "It is extraordinary that the BBC is pulling the programme as a result of pressure from the Conservative party. If there are fresh revelations, the people of Westminster deserve to know about them before they go to the polls."

== Cultural depictions ==
In November 2009 (and repeated in October 2011), BBC Radio 4 broadcast a radio play – Shirleymander – depicting the principal events of Porter's time as leader of Westminster City Council in the 1980s, in which she was played by Tracy-Ann Oberman. In 2018, a stage adaptation starring Jessica Martin opened at the Playground Theatre in North Kensington, west London, ran for several weeks.

== See also ==
- Westminster cemeteries scandal
- Westminster City Council v Duke of Westminster
