= Art & Gadg =

2013 radio play, directed by Marc Beeby

Art & Gadg is an original radio play by Gregory Evans about the relationship between Arthur Miller (Art) and Elia Kazan (Gadg short for gadget, a nickname of Kazan). The 45-minute play was first transmitted on BBC Radio 4 on 15 January 2013. It was directed by Marc Beeby.

== Synopsis ==
After 10 years of estrangement, Arthur Miller and Elia Kazan, two giants of American theatre, are forced to confront their intense, almost brotherly friendship - and the ways it was destroyed by the great moral and political dilemma of the time.

== Cast ==
- Nathan Osgood as Arthur Miller
- Karl Johnson as Elia Kazan
- Fenella Woolgaras Barbara Loden.
