= The Polish Soldier =

Radio play written by Gregory Evans

The Polish Soldier is a radio play by Gregory Evans, first transmitted on BBC Radio 4 on January 24, 2001. The cast included Jeremy Northam and Teresa Gallagher. The play was directed by Ned Chaillet.
