= East Finchley Cemetery =

Cemetery in London, England

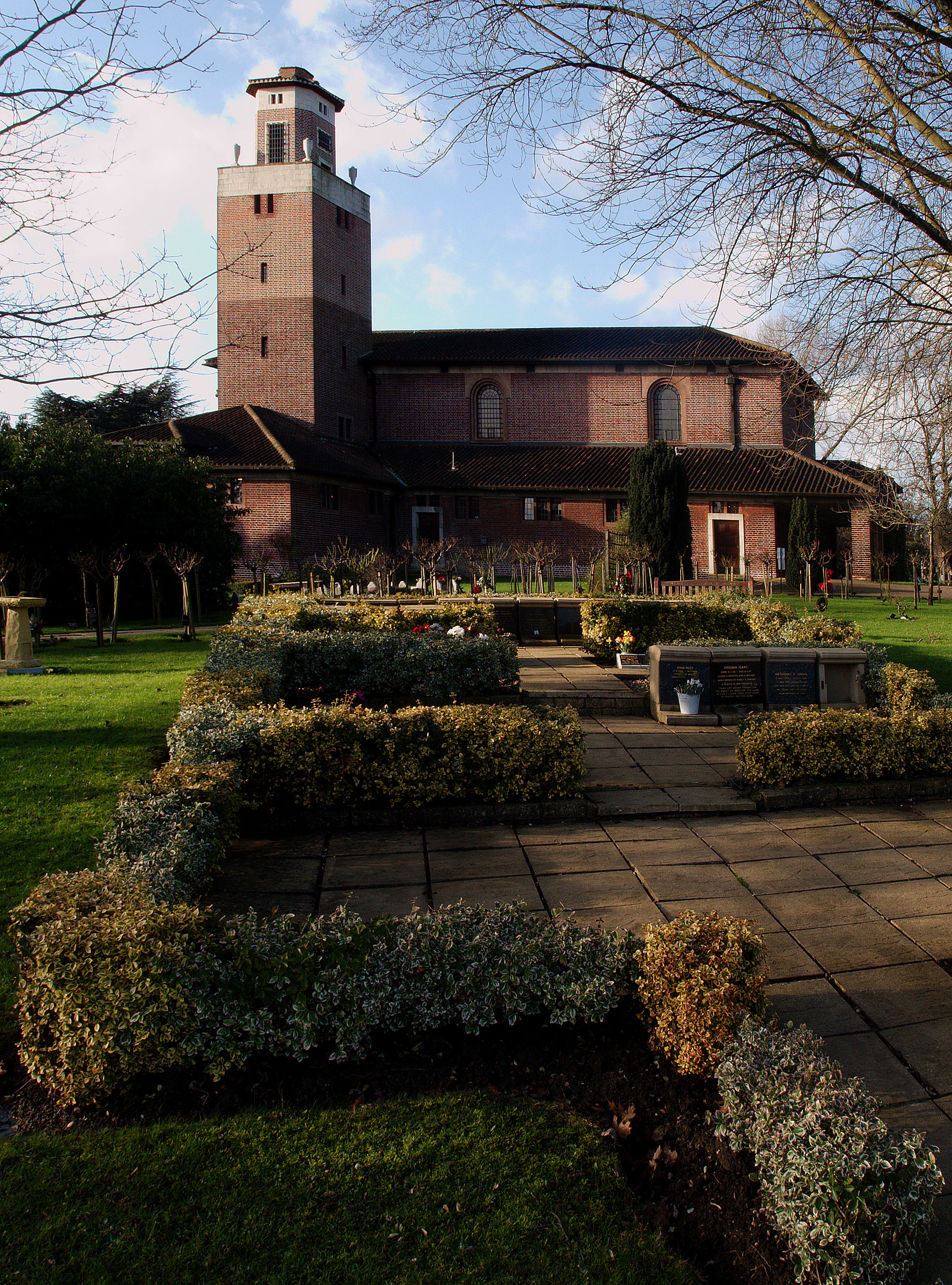
- Crematorium, East Finchley Cemetery
- Interactive map of East Finchley Cemetery

Details
- Established: 1854
- Location: 122 East End Road, London, N2 0SP
- Country: England
- Coordinates: 51.592°N 0.184°W
- Type: Public
- Owned by: City of Westminster
- Size: 47 acres (19 ha)
- Website: City of Westminster website

East Finchley Cemetery is a cemetery and crematorium in East End Road, East Finchley. Although it is in the London Borough of Barnet, it is owned and managed by the City of Westminster.

== History and characteristics ==
The St Marylebone Burial Board purchased 47 acres (0.19 km^{2}) of Newmarket Farm in 1854; and the cemetery, then known as St Marylebone Cemetery, was laid out by architects Barnett & Birch after winning a competition.

Principal features are two Lebanon Cedar trees planted on the front lawn. The crematorium was opened in 1937.

Due to local government reorganisation, the cemetery was managed by the Metropolitan Borough of St Marylebone – from 1900; and became the responsibility of the City of Westminster in 1965, when the cemetery became known by its current name. The cemetery contains about 22,000 interments, and remains open for burials.

The cemetery became a point of controversy in the early nineties when the then Leader of Westminster City Council, Shirley Porter, and one of the councillors wanted the cemetery to be sold (to avoid the substantial upkeep). The cemetery also included a considerable amount of land being used at the time for plant propagation for horticultural use throughout the City of Westminster; it also provided housing for the Cemetery Keeper. After much argument at Council meetings and against the advice of the Chief Officers concerned, the cemetery was sold, the transaction then became part of the Westminster cemeteries scandal. The council was forced, after the move had been declared unlawful, to repurchase the cemetery but was unable to buy back the crematorium. This was purchased by the London Cremation Company.

The cemetery contains a number of structures listed on the National Heritage List for England.

The Anglican chapel was designed by Barnett and Birch and is a Grade II listed chapel, as is the crematorium. The gates and lodge are also Grade II listed.

The monuments to Thomas Skarratt Hall (supposedly based on the Sarcophagus of Lucius Cornelius Scipio Barbatus, it originally had four bronze angels, which were stolen in 1989), Harry Ripley (by William Reid Dick), Peter Nicol Russell, Thomas Tate (by Frank Lynn Jenkins), and the mausoleum (by Arthur Blomfield) of Algernon Borthwick, 1st Baron Glenesk and his wife and son, are all Grade II listed.

The cemetery was awarded a Green Flag Award in 2007, 2008 and 2009. It is also a Site of Local Importance for Nature Conservation.

== Notable burials & cremations ==
- Melanie Appleby – Mel in pop duo Mel and Kim
- George Barham – founder of the Express County Milk Company
- Henry Walter Bates – Naturalist and explorer who gave the first scientific account of mimicry in animals
- Jeremy Beadle – TV presenter (cremated here, ashes later interred in Highgate Cemetery)
- Louisa Sarah Bevington - anarchist and poet
- Sir Henry Bishop – Professor of Music at Oxford and operatic composer
- Keith Blakelock – Police Constable murdered in 1985 Tottenham riot
- Algernon Borthwick, 1st Baron Glenesk – Memorial chapel and Mausoleum
- Sir James Boyton, British estate agent and a Conservative politician
- Sir Austen Chamberlain – Foreign Secretary, recipient of Nobel Peace Prize, son of Joseph Chamberlain and brother of Neville Chamberlain
- Harry Champion – Music Hall singer
- Sarah Emily Davies – Foundress of Girton College, Cambridge (known widely as Miss Davies)

The grave of Emily Davies.

- Robert Donat – Actor (cremated).
- Alfred Ellis - photographer
- Matthew Garber – Actor (cremated).
- Sir Edmund Gosse – English poet, author and critic
- William Gowland – Engineer and archaeologist who for many years lived in Japan
- Thomas Skarratt Hall – foundation investor in the Mount Morgan mine, Queensland, Australia
- Manya Harari – translator of Russian literature and the co-founder of Harvill Press

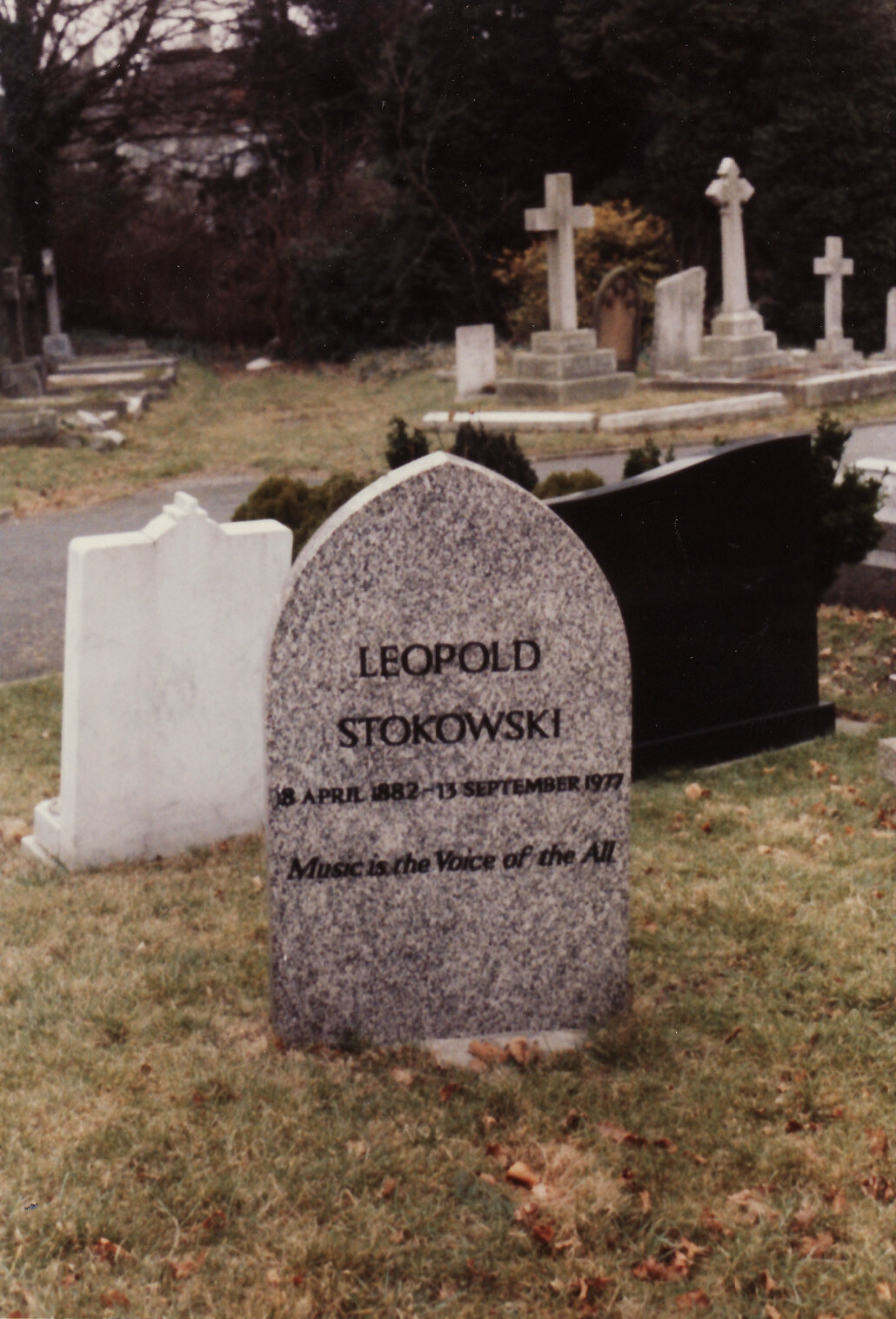
Leopold Stokowski's grave at East Finchley Cemetery

- Alfred Harmsworth, 1st Viscount Northcliffe – Founder of the Daily Mail
- Cecil Harmsworth, 1st Baron Harmsworth – British businessman and Liberal politician
- Sir Leicester Harmsworth – Newspaper Publisher with a memorial by Edwin Lutyens
- Harold Harrison – England rugby union international, died serving as army Colonel in World War II (cremated).
- Sir George Hayter – Queen Victoria's principal painter in ordinary
- Max Herrmann-Neisse – exiled German poet and novelist
- Quintin Hogg (merchant) – English merchant and philanthropist, remembered primarily as a benefactor of the Royal Polytechnic institution at Regent Street, London, now the University of Westminster (previously cremated).
- Fanny Houston – British philanthropist, political activist and suffragette.
- Edmond Hoyle - writer on games
- Thomas Henry Huxley – Scientist
- Toto Koopman – Model and Italian Resistance spy
- Sir Edwin Lutyens - English architect (cremated, ashes buried in crypt of St Paul's Cathedral)
- Humphrey Lyttelton – English jazz musician and broadcaster (cremated)
- Jimmy Nervo – entertainer and part of the original Crazy Gang
- Sir James Paget – English surgeon and pathologist after whom Paget's disease is named
- Sidney Paget – Illustrator of Arthur Conan Doyle's Sherlock Holmes stories
- Wendy Richard – Actress, previously cremated at Golders Green Crematorium
- W. Heath Robinson – Artist and cartoonist
- Gaynor Rowlands – Actress and Singer
- Sir Thomas Smith, 1st Baronet, of Stratford Place – eminent British surgeon, Surgeon Extraordinary to Queen Victoria and honorary Serjeant-Surgeon to Edward VII
- Henry Charles Stephens – Ink magnate, philanthropist and local MP
- Thomas Stevens – Cyclist, the first one to circle the globe by bicycle
- Marie Studholme – Actress and Singer
- Leopold Stokowski – Conductor
- William Bernhardt Tegetmeier – English naturalist, bee keeper and friend of Charles Darwin
- Little Tich – Music Hall singer and dancer
- Mathilde Verne – English pianist and teacher (Queen Elizabeth The Queen Mother)
- George Walters – Sergeant in the 49th Foot who won the Victoria Cross at the Battle of Inkermann in 1854
- Kenneth Williams – Actor and comedian (cremated)
- Albert Yorke, 6th Earl of Hardwicke – British diplomat and Conservative politician.
- Charles Yorke, 5th Earl of Hardwicke – Champagne Charlie – British aristocrat and Conservative politician
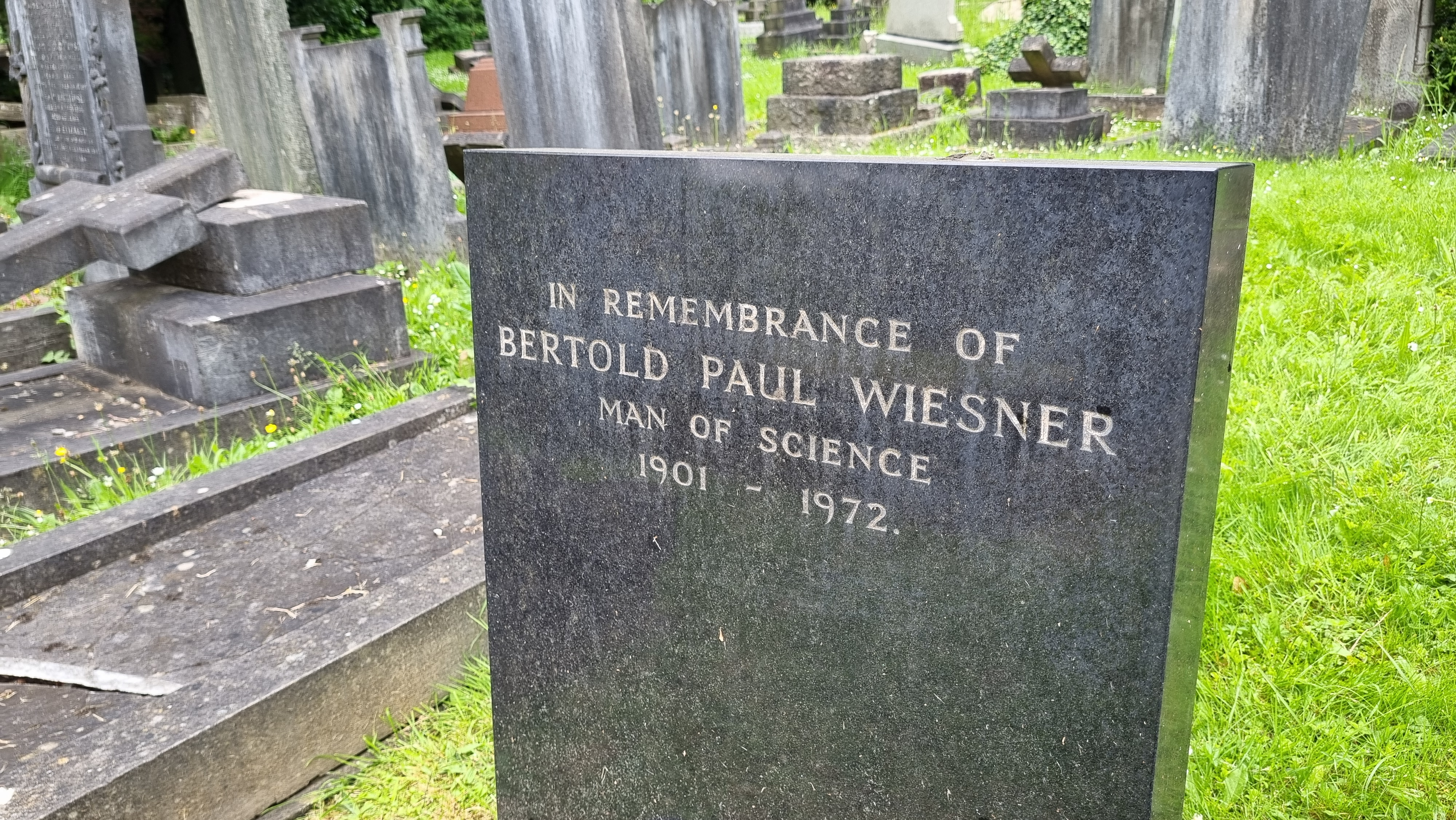
- Bertold Wiesner's gravestone.
  Bertold Wiesner – Austrian-British physiologist and fertility researcher

== War graves ==
There are 75 Commonwealth service war burials of World War I in the cemetery, most in the War Graves plot in the cemetery's northwest corner that was set aside for military burials in 1916, and 79 of World War II (including two unidentified British soldiers), besides ten 'Non War graves' that the Commonwealth War Graves Commission maintains. A Screen Wall memorial, behind the Cross of Sacrifice, records the names of the 20 World War II casualties who were cremated at the St Marylebone Crematorium. There are also special memorials to eight World War I servicemen whose graves could not be marked by headstones.

== Transport ==
The cemetery on East End Road is situated near the North Circular Road (A406) and lies between East Finchley and Finchley Central stations, both on the Northern Line. Access by stairway is possible from bus stops on the North Circular Road.

== See also ==
- Nature reserves in Barnet
- St Pancras and Islington Cemetery
- Westminster cemeteries scandal

== Gallery ==
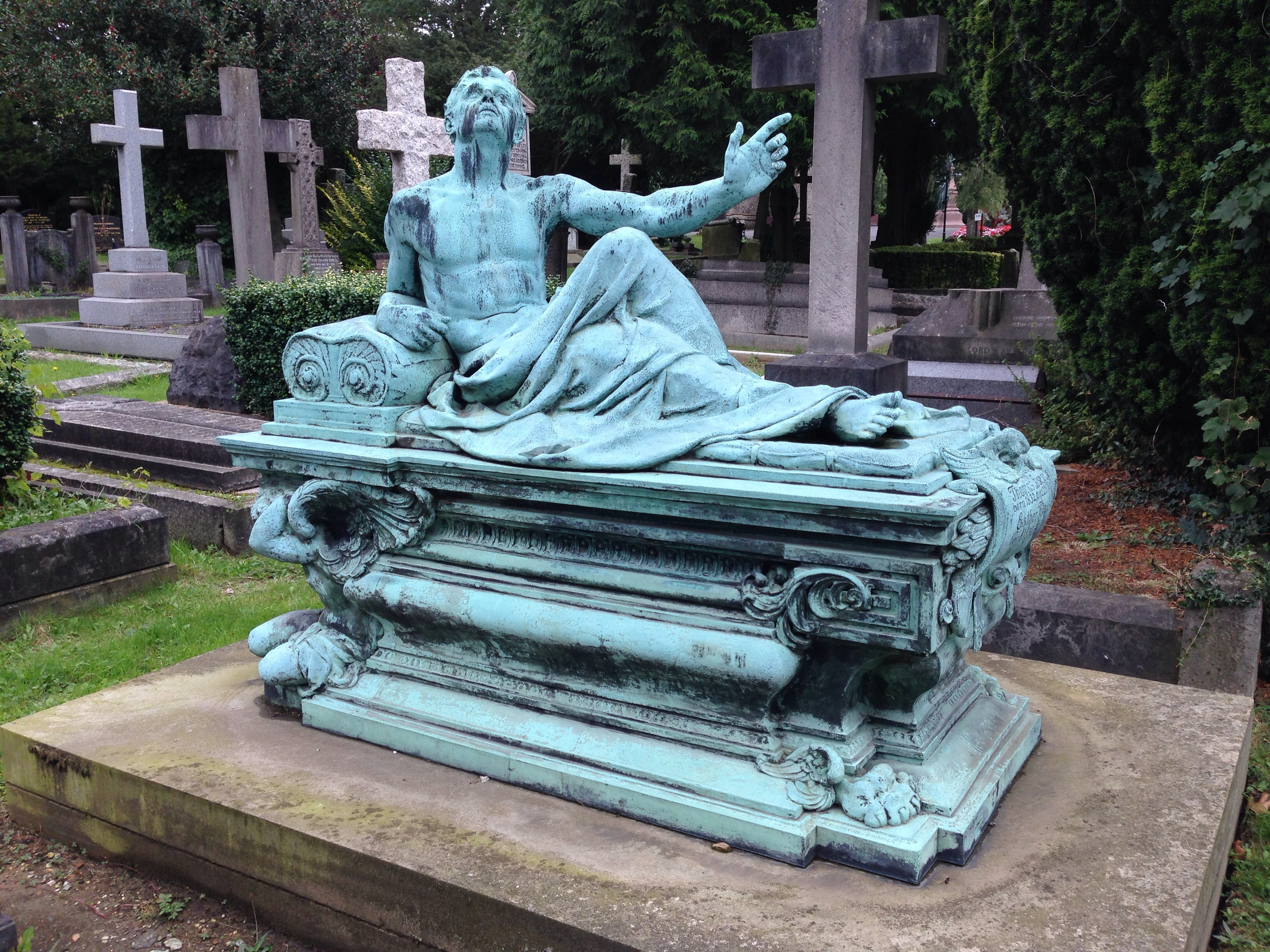
Monument to Sir Thomas and Esther Tate

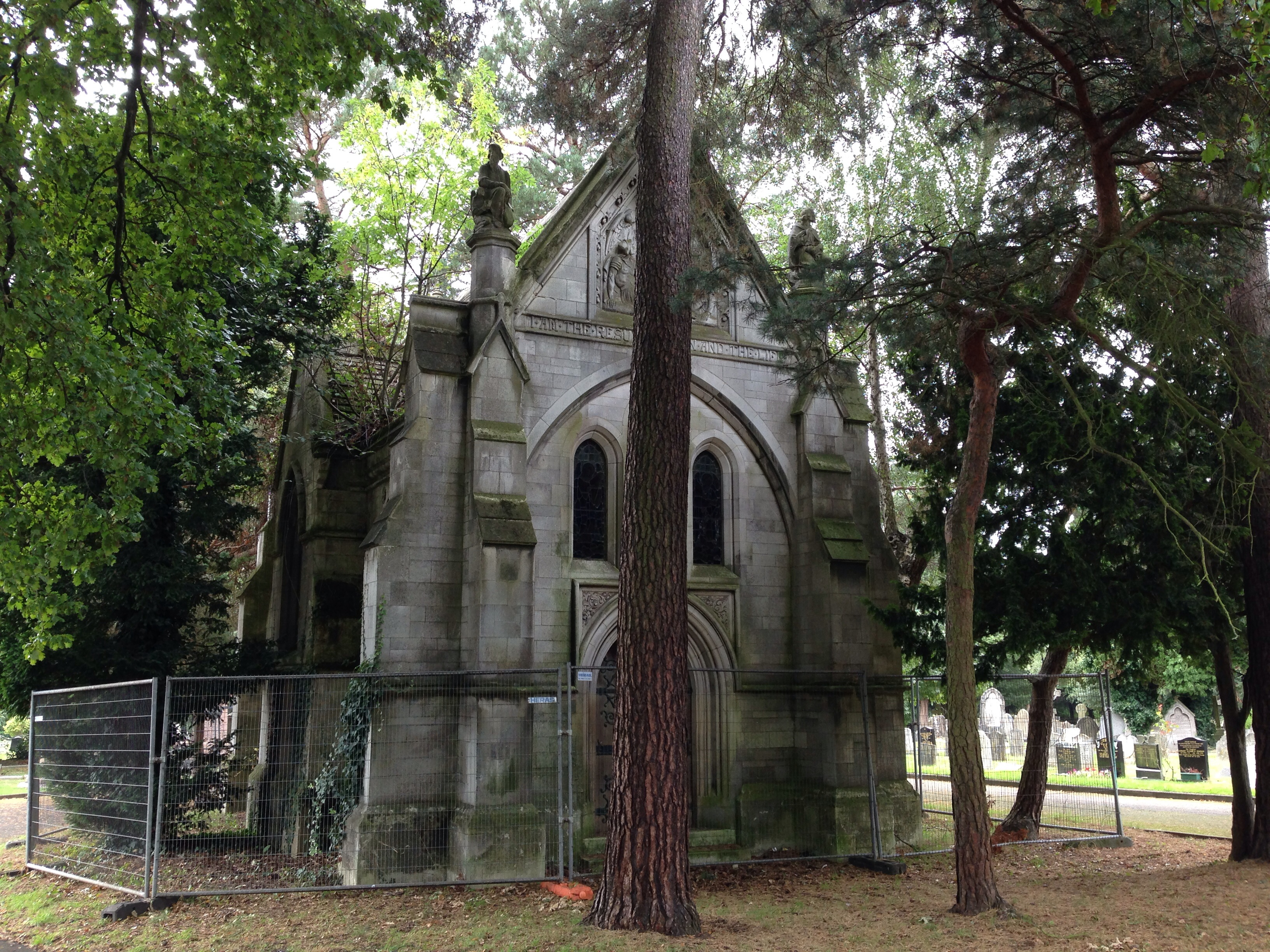
The Glenesk Mausoleum

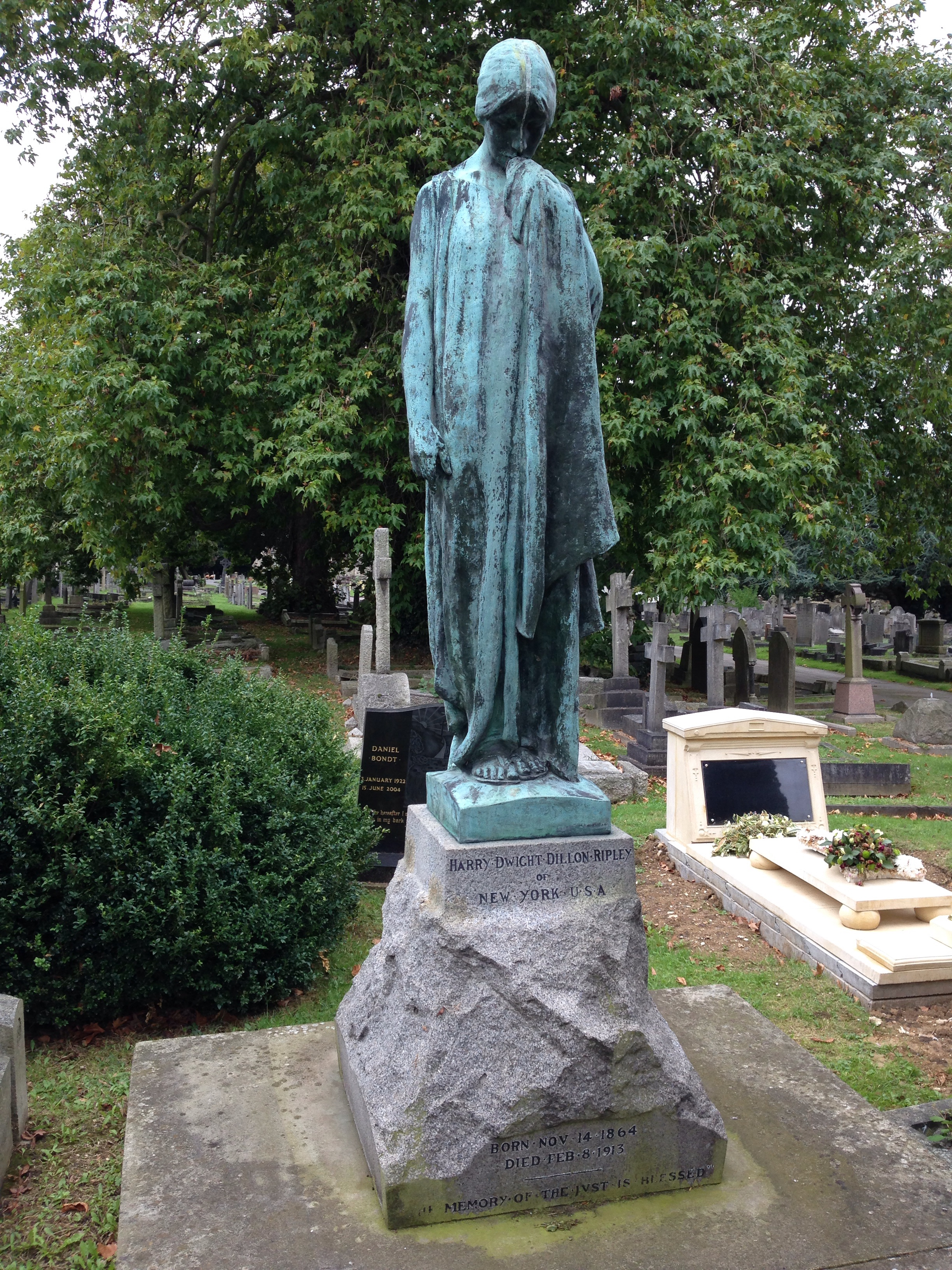
Monument to Harry Ripley
