= Thomas Skarratt Hall =

British bank manager and mine director

Thomas Skarratt Hall (6 December 1836 – 14 June 1903) was a British bank manager and mine director in Rockhampton, Queensland, Australia.

== Early life ==
Thomas Skarratt Hall was born on 6 December 1836 in Kington, Herefordshire, England, the son of Walter Hall and Elizabeth Carleton Skarratt.

== Banking career ==
Hall came to Australia in 1854. He took up his residence in Rockhampton in 1863 and for some time held the position of accountant in the Rockhampton branch of the Australian Joint Stock Bank. From there, he went to Clermont to manage the bank's business, but came back to Rockhampton early in 1866 to manage the Rockhampton branch.

Some years after he was transferred to Goulburn, New South Wales. He married Jane Kirk, daughter of Joseph Kirk, at the Church of England in Kyneton, Victoria on 18 January 1877 and then returned to Rockhampton as manager of the Queensland National Bank's Rockhampton branch.

== Mining involvement ==
Hall was one of the original owners of the Mount Morgan mine, the first chairman of the Mount Morgan company, and served as one of its directors from the formation of the company.

== Later life ==
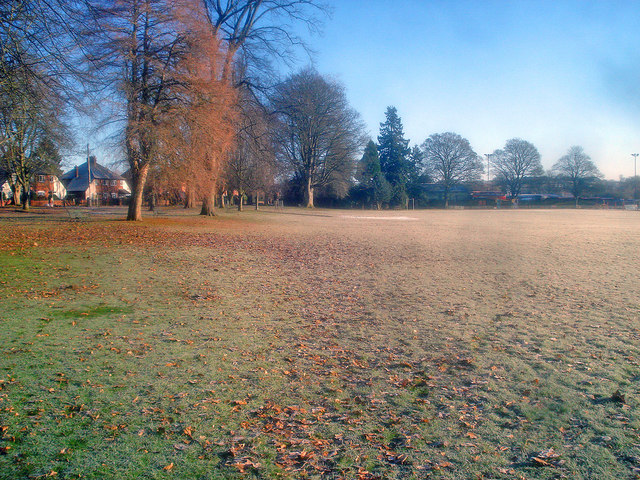
Recreation ground, Kington, 2010

At the end of 1887 or the beginning of 1888, he retired from the service of the bank and took up his residence in Melbourne. A few years after he moved to England, where he has lived for the rest of his life apart for a visit to Rockhampton in about 1900.

In 1888, he donated a parcel of 12 acres of parkland to his home town Kington as a charitable trust to be used as a recreation ground.

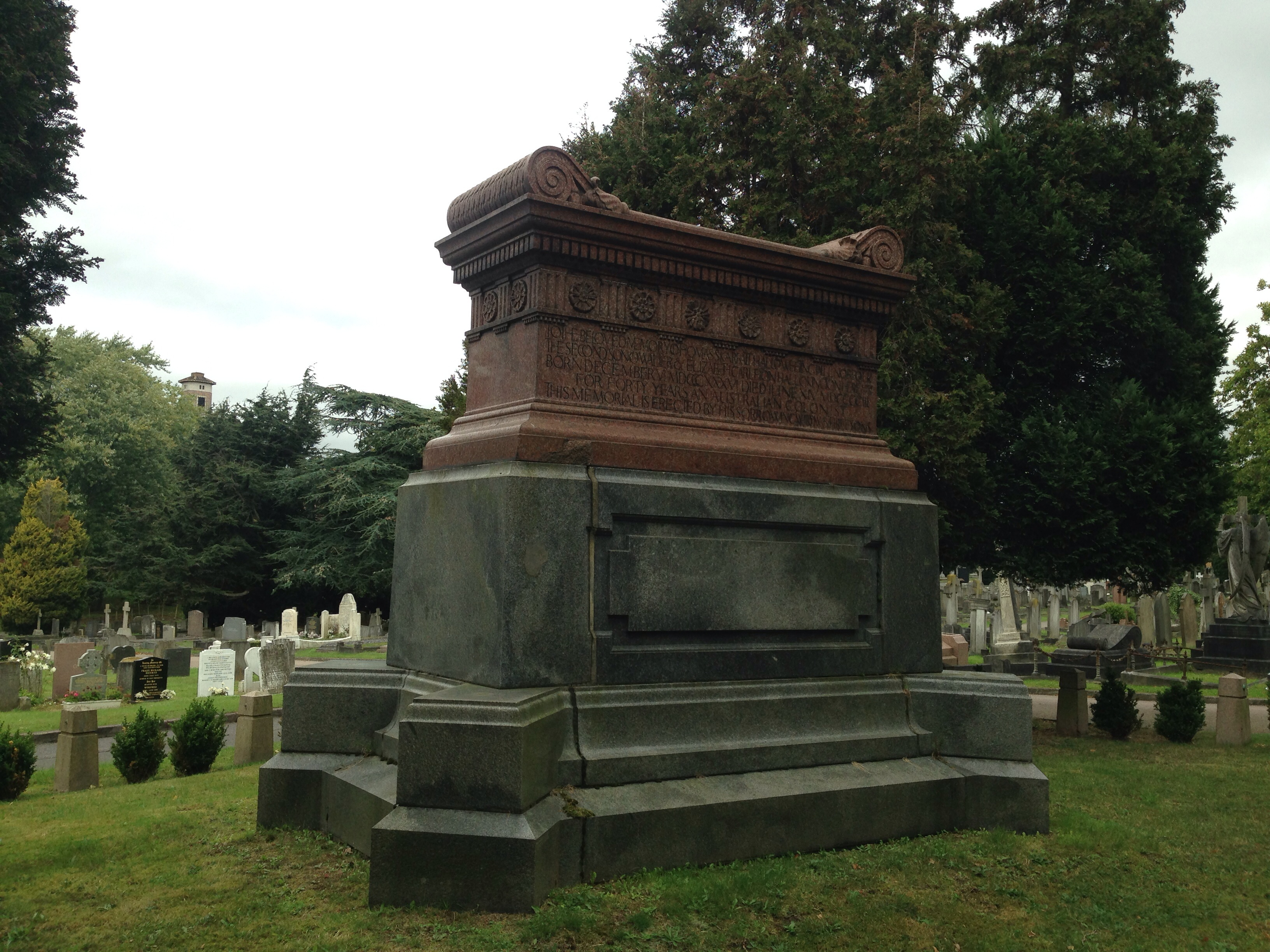
Tomb of Thomas Skarratt Hall in East Finchley Cemetery, 2016

In late 1898 or early 1899, Hall purchased Weeting Hall in Weeting, Norfolk as a country estate. He renovated the house as it had been in poor condition, having been vacant for some time.

Hall died in London on 14 June 1903 aged 66 years of age, leaving a widow and three sons. He was buried in the East Finchley cemetery in the City of London in a grey and pink granite tomb built on an island and said to be modelled upon Napoleon's tomb in Paris. His family continued to live in Weeting Hall until 1927.

== Legacy ==
Hall was not very much interested in public affairs in Rockhampton, but he was always willing to support any movement which was for the advantage of the town. His willingness to help his commitment to the community made him one of Rockhampton's most respected and liked bank managers.

His tomb is listed as a Grade II building on the National Heritage List for England.
