= Peter Bradley (politician) =

British politician (born 1953)

Member of Parliament for The Wrekin
- In office 1 May 1997 – 11 April 2005
- Preceded by: Bruce Grocott (who continued to represent the new neighbouring seat of Telford until 2001)
- Succeeded by: Mark Pritchard

Westminster City Councillor for Millbank Ward
- In office 1986–1996
- Preceded by: A.L. Cotcher (Con)
- Succeeded by: Mair Eluned Garside (Lab)

Personal details
- Born: 12 April 1953 (age 73) Erdington, Birmingham
- Party: Labour
- Education: University of Sussex

Peter Charles Stephen Bradley (born 12 April 1953) is an English Labour Party politician. He was the Member of Parliament for The Wrekin between 1997 and 2005.

== Early life ==
Bradley was born in Erdington, Birmingham, on 12 April 1953 to Fred Bradley (1915–2004), born Fritz Brandes, and his wife Trudie Bradley. His father arrived in England in 1939 as a Jewish refugee from Nazi Germany, whose story Bradley only came to know fully following his father's death in 2004. His paternal grandparents Salamon and Bertha Brandes, who formerly ran a drapery business in Bamberg, Bavaria, were deported in 1941 to German-occupied Latvia, where his grandmother was executed in a massacre in Riga and his grandfather was last heard of alive doing forced labour in a peat bog.

Bradley was educated at Abingdon School – where he was a classmate of Francis Maude – and the University of Sussex, followed by Occidental College, Los Angeles. Before entering Parliament, he was managing director of Millbank Consultants Ltd (1993–97) and previously a director of Good Relations Ltd (1986–93) prior to which he was the research director at the Centre for Contemporary Studies (1979–86).

== Political career ==
=== Labour councillor ===
As a member of Westminster Council and deputy Leader of the Labour Group, he was a leader of the campaign to expose the 'Homes for Votes' scandal which led eventually to the surcharging of the former Conservative Council Leader Dame Shirley Porter and colleagues in 1996.

=== Member of Parliament ===
Bradley was elected to the constituency of The Wrekin in Shropshire in the 1997 general election. Major boundary changes took effect ahead of that election, which created a new constituency containing and named after the town of Telford, before which Telford had been one of the largest elements of The Wrekin. The incumbent Labour MP for The Wrekin, Bruce Grocott, decided to stand for the new Telford seat in the 1997 general election. The new Telford constituency took 62.9% of the electorate of The Wrekin, leaving the remaining 37.1% to constitute a revised constituency of The Wrekin that incorporated areas previously within Shropshire North and Ludlow from two sides. This meant that although Labour won the largely Telford-based version of the constituency in the previous general election of 1992, the new constituency which was much more rural was likely to have been won by the Conservatives in 1992 if it had existed then.

In Parliament, he founded and chaired the Rural Group of Labour MPs which played a major part in shaping the Government's Rural White Paper and was subsequently appointed Parliamentary Private Secretary to Alun Michael. His involvement in the bill to ban hunting led to his constituency being targeted by the Countryside Party at the 2005 election. He was also a target of the strategy led by Lord Ashcroft to concentrate resources on key marginal seats which saw £50,000 donated to the Conservative campaign to unseat him.

Known for his campaigning commitment and skill, he secured a saving of £240 million in the annual NHS drugs budget following a successful campaign to regulate pharmaceutical company practices (2001). He also promoted the Members of Parliament (Employment Disqualification) Bill which sought to prevent MPs from neglecting their Parliamentary duties in pursuit of parallel careers (2002) and the Right to Reply & Press Standards Bill (2005) which, with the support of the NUJ, MediaWise and the Campaign for Press and Broadcasting Freedom attempted to provide stronger protection to members of the public affected by misrepresentation in the press and to introduce controls on journalists' excesses. In 2011, he submitted evidence to the Leveson Inquiry based on the substance of the Bill. With Alan Whitehead MP, he was also credited with negotiating the restoration of the student grant through the Higher Education Act (2004). He was a member of the Public Administration Select Committee, 1997–9, which played a major role in the development and passage of the Freedom of Information Act 2000. He subsequently lost his seat to Conservative politician Mark Pritchard.

Since leaving Parliament, he was a member of the Affordable Rural Housing Commission (2005–06) and subsequently of the Government's Rural Housing Advisory Group (2007–08).

== Charity work ==
He is a co-founder and director of the Speakers' Corner Trust, a registered charity promoting free expression, public debate and active citizenship as a means of revitalising civil society in the UK as well as in Berlin, Prague and Nigeria.

== Personal life ==
Bradley is married to Annie (née Hart), a teacher. They have two children. Bradley is a member of Warwickshire County Cricket Club and supports Aston Villa F.C. He is also an honorary patron of A.F.C. Telford United football club.

He published a book about his father's experiences on 12 May 2022, The Last Train - A Family's History of the Final Solution.

== Works ==
- "AntiSocial Britain and the challenge of citizenship". London: Social Market Foundation. 2007.

== See also ==
- Homes for votes scandal
- Westminster cemeteries scandal
- List of Old Abingdonians

Parliament of the United Kingdom
Preceded by Bruce Grocott	Member of Parliament for The Wrekin; 1997–2005	Succeeded by Mark Pritchard
