= And There's More =

Television comedy show (1985–88)

- Genre: Comedy; Sketch comedy
- Written by: Ray Allen; Charlie Adams; John Blight; Steven Brown; Gordon MacGregor; Roger Johnson; John Langdon; Trevor McCallum; Ray Martin; Tim Whitnall
- Directed by: Tony Wolfe
- Starring: Jimmy Cricket
- Country of origin: United Kingdom
- Original language: English
- No. of seasons: 4
- No. of episodes: 24 (inc. 1 special)

Production
- Producer: Central Independent Television
- Running time: 30 minutes (including adverts)

Original release
- Network: ITV
- Release: 28 June 1985 – 2 July 1988

And There's More is a British comedy sketch show starring Jimmy Cricket produced by Central Independent Television for ITV between 28 June 1985 and 2 July 1988.

== Cast ==
Over the four series, Cricket was joined by a number of other performers:

=== Series One ===
- Rory Bremner
- Jessica Martin
- Adrian Walsh
- Billy Dainty

=== Series Two ===
- Brian Conley
- Hi Ching
- Nicky Croyden
- Fred Evans
- Patti Gold
- Paul Gyngell
- Andrea Levine

=== Series Three ===
- Eddie Braben
- Tim Barker
- Hugh Lloyd
- Granville Saxton
- Joan Sims
- Nicholas Smith

=== Series Four ===
- Sherrie Hewson
- Hugh Paddick
- Granville Saxton
- Chris Sullivan

== Transmissions ==
Series	Episodes	Originally released	
Series	Episodes	First released	Last released
1	6	28 June 1985	2 August 1985
All Cricket and Wellies		5 July 1986	
2	6	12 July 1986	16 August 1986
3	6	3 July 1987	7 August 1987
4	6	28 May 1988	2 July 1988
