= Audit Commission (United Kingdom) =

English local auditing body (1983–2015)

- Logo of the Audit Commission

Agency overview
- Formed: 1 April 1983
- Dissolved: 31 March 2015
- Headquarters: 1st Floor Millbank Tower; Millbank; London SW1P 4HQ
- Motto: Protecting the public purse
- Employees: 180
- Annual budget: £213m (2009-10)
- Website: audit-commission.gov.uk

The Audit Commission was a public corporation in the United Kingdom from 1983 to 2015. The commission's primary objective was to appoint auditors to a range of local public bodies in England (and Wales until 2005), set the standards for auditors and oversee their work. The commission closed on 31 March 2015, with its functions being transferred to the voluntary, not-for-profit or private sector.

On 13 August 2010, it was leaked to the media, ahead of an official announcement, that the commission was to be scrapped. In 2009-10 the commission cost the central government £28 million to run, with the remainder of its income coming from audit fees charged to local public bodies.

== History ==
Local government audit law has its origins in nineteenth century Poor Law and public health legislation.

The Audit Commission was established under the Local Government Finance Act 1982, to appoint auditors to all local authorities in England and Wales and it became operational on 1 April 1983. The National Health Service and Community Care Act 1990 extended the remit of the commission to cover health service bodies. Legislation covering the commission's activities was consolidated into the Audit Commission Act 1998. In 1985-86 the commission led the investigation of the rate-capping rebellion which resulted in 32 Lambeth councillors and 47 Liverpool councillors being surcharged and banned from office.

The commission gained responsibility for auditing the National Health Service in 1990, and fire and rescue services in 2004. In 1996 the commission began joint reviews of social services (with the Social Services Inspectorate of the Department of Health), and in 1997, reviews of local education authorities (LEAs) jointly with Ofsted.

On 1 April 2005, the commission's remit in Wales was transferred to the Auditor General for Wales.

=== Westminster Council 'homes-for-votes' ===
The gerrymandering Homes for votes scandal at Westminster Council was uncovered by the Audit Commission's District Auditor, John Magill, who found that between 1987 and 1989, council houses were sold at below market value to families likely to vote Conservative.

Mr Magill found the former leader of the council, Dame Shirley Porter and five other council officials 'jointly and severally' liable for repaying £36.1 million to the council. Mr Magill's verdict was upheld in the House of Lords in 2001. Dame Shirley Porter eventually settled in 2004, paying £12.3 million to Westminster Council.

=== National Fraud Initiative ===
The Audit Commission ran the National Fraud Initiative from 1996, a UK-wide anti-fraud programme. Between 1996 and 2013 it traced £1.17 billion in fraud, including £215 million in 2008-9, as more councils provided data and most recently £203m in 2012-13.

=== Closure ===
On 13 August 2010, the Secretary of State for Communities and Local Government, Eric Pickles, announced that the commission was to be scrapped, with its functions being transferred to the voluntary, not-for-profit or private sector. The government aimed to save £50m annually, with the commission's function transferred to the Local Government Ombudsman and private accounting firms.

Accounting body ACCA expressed doubt that the private sector would match the commission's experience and consistency.

The Financial Reporting Council suggested to a House of Lords committee that government should not sell the Audit Commission's practice to any of the Big Four auditors, otherwise their dominance of the audit market would be further enhanced.

In 2012 a proposed employee-owned firm won only one of ten regional contracts and was launched as a subsidiary of Mazars. Grant Thornton won the largest share, four contracts, and took on about 350 staff from the commission. KPMG and Ernst & Young won three and two contracts respectively. The Commission estimated that audit fee savings at 'up to 40%' will arise as a result of these arrangements.

A small number of staff were retained at the Audit Commission to monitor these contracts until the commission was abolished. Provision to abolish the commission was included in the Local Audit and Accountability Act 2014, and the commission was formally closed on 31 March 2015.

By 2023, it was being reported that many councils were years behind on having their accounts audited and that the closure and privatisation of the Audit Commission was being seen as a failure. In an October 2023 piece for The Municipal Journal, Lee Rowley, the local government minister, admitted that the local government audit system "has not worked as well as it should for a number of years". Only five out of 467 local authorities had their 2022-23 accounts signed off before the required deadline. The Guardian reported that ten public bodies (including Slough Borough Council, which had issued a Section 114 notice in 2021) had not had an audit in five years and that, according to the Institute of Chartered Accountants in England and Wales, only 101 people in the entire country were qualified to audit local government accounts.

== Function ==
Functions of the Audit Commission included:

- Audit: Auditors appointed by the Audit Commission were responsible for auditing local government in England, National Health Service trusts and other local agencies in England, covering local government, health, housing, fire and rescue and community safety.
- Research: The Audit Commission published studies that analysed and commented upon wide-ranging social and financial issues in the UK.
- Data-matching: The National Fraud Initiative compared data from a wide range of sources (including data from UKBA, Local Government, Central Government Departments and the NHS) to help participating organisations discover cases of fraud, overpayment and error.

The Audit Commission worked in partnership with – but operated independently of – a number of government departments including the Department for Communities and Local Government, the Home Office, and the Department of Health.

Previously the commission also produced performance assessments for councils, fire and rescue services, and housing organisations. In July 2009, it launched the Comprehensive Area Assessment, which assessed the effectiveness of local public services.

== Funding ==
Between 1983 and 1998 the commission was self-funding, operating purely on income from audit fees. In 1998 the central government began providing grants to the commission due to its new responsibilities under "Best Value" legislation, and for the cost of setting up the Best Value and Housing Inspectorates.

In 2009-10 the commission had an operating income of £213.1m. 86% of this came from fees charged to bodies audited; just 13% (£28.0m) came from central government grants. Around 70% of the commission's income in 2009-10 came from the local government sector, with the remainder coming from the health sector. Before the Coalition government announced further cuts, the commission had planned to cut spending by £32.1m by March 2013.

Thirty percent of the commission's audits were carried out by five private audit firms.

== Structure ==
=== Chairman and commissioners ===
The governing board of the Audit Commission was made up of commissioners appointed by the Department of Communities and Local Government. Previous chairmen included Jeremy Newman, former chief executive of BDO International (2008-2011) and Michael O'Higgins (2006-2012), who had for 10 years previously been managing partner of PA Consulting.

=== Controller of Audit / Chief Executive ===
Marcine Waterman took up the post of Controller of Audit in September 2012.

Previous incumbents include Eugene Sullivan, Steve Bundred (later of Monitor), Sir John Banham (later of the CBI), Sir Howard Davies (later of the CBI), Bank of England, FSA (Financial Services Authority) and LSE (London School of Economics), and Sir Andrew Foster.

== Criticism and controversy ==
- The commission had been criticised for its methods, particularly how it rated councils and health organisations. Liberal Democrat MP Vince Cable described the process organisations go through to earn stars as "disrespectful and utterly perverse".
- Occupational psychologist John Seddon called for the commission to be scrapped, which led to what The Times described as a "caustic personal attack" on Seddon from the commission.
- In 2009, the commission caused controversy when it published a report into the 2008–2011 Icelandic financial crisis which accused seven local authorities of acting negligently by depositing £33 million into Icelandic banks a few days before they collapsed in October 2008. The Audit Commission had already stated that it too had deposited £10 million in Icelandic banks in the months leading up to the collapse.
- In 2010, Eric Pickles and Bob Neill accused the Commission of "shocking excess" in its expenditure, such as hiring external venues for staff training. Michael O'Higgins, the commission's chairman, defended the expenditure on BBC Radio 4's Today programme.
- One of the features of the criticism of the Audit Commission was an apparent campaign carried out in the press. On 3 November 2010, newspapers carried articles about alleged extravagant spending by the Audit Commission after its abolition was announced.

== See also ==
- National Audit Office (United Kingdom)
- Local Audit Office
- Audit Wales
- Audit Scotland
- Northern Ireland Audit Office
- Care Quality Commission
- His Majesty's Inspectorate of Constabulary and Fire & Rescue Services
- His Majesty's Chief Inspector of Prisons
- His Majesty's Inspectorate of Probation
- Ofsted
