= David Weeks (politician) =

British politician (1946–2021)

Leader of Westminster City Council
- In office 1991–1993
- Preceded by: Shirley Porter
- Succeeded by: Miles Young

Councillor (Warwick Ward)
- In office 1974–1978

Councillor (St. George's Ward)
- In office 1978–1998

Personal details
- Born: 26 March 1946
- Died: 2 November 2021 (aged 75)
- Party: Conservative
- Occupation: Politician

David Peter Weeks (26 March 1946 – 2 November 2021) was a British Conservative politician who was Leader of Westminster City Council. He served on the council from 1974 to 1998.

== Career ==
Weeks was leader of the council from 1991 to 1993, deputy leader from 1983 to 1991, and acting leader during 1987 to 1988. He chaired several of the council's major committees: Policy and Resources from 1991 to 1993; Planning and Development, 1987 to 1991; Finance and Personnel, 1983 to 1987; and Housing, 1979 to 1983. From 1977 to 1979 he was the chief whip of the council's ruling Conservative group.

He was Leader of the Council at the time it agreed to buy back the Westminster Cemeteries after they were sold without proper provision for maintenance – a decision made by Shirley Porter to which David was not a party.

== Homes for Votes scandal ==
Weeks was deputy leader to Shirley Porter at the time of the "Homes for votes scandal" and was found jointly liable along with Porter and others to the tune of £36 million by the District Auditor, but this was reduced on appeal by the High Court. In a 2001 judgement, Lord Bingham of Cornhill, described Dame Shirley and David Weeks, as guilty of a "...deliberate, blatant and dishonest misuse of public power. It was a misuse of power by both of them not for the purpose of financial gain but for that of electoral advantage. In that sense it was corrupt." Lord Scott said:

The corruption was not money corruption. No one took a bribe. No one sought or received money for political favours. But there are other forms of corruption, often less easily detectable and therefore more insidious. Gerrymandering, the manipulation of constituency boundaries for party political advantage, is a clear form of political corruption.

== Personal life and death ==
Weeks died from cancer on 2 November 2021, at the age of 75. He was survived by his wife, Heather Marguerite, whom he was married to for 50 years. She was Secretary of the Ditchley Foundation and Ditchley Park Conference Centre, for which work she was awarded an OBE. They lived in flats in Beatty House, Dolphin Square, London and 15 Grand Avenue, Hove. She died on 5 September 2024.

== See also ==
- Westminster cemeteries scandal
