= Jimmy Cricket =

Northern Irish comedian (1945–2026)

Jimmy Cricket KSG
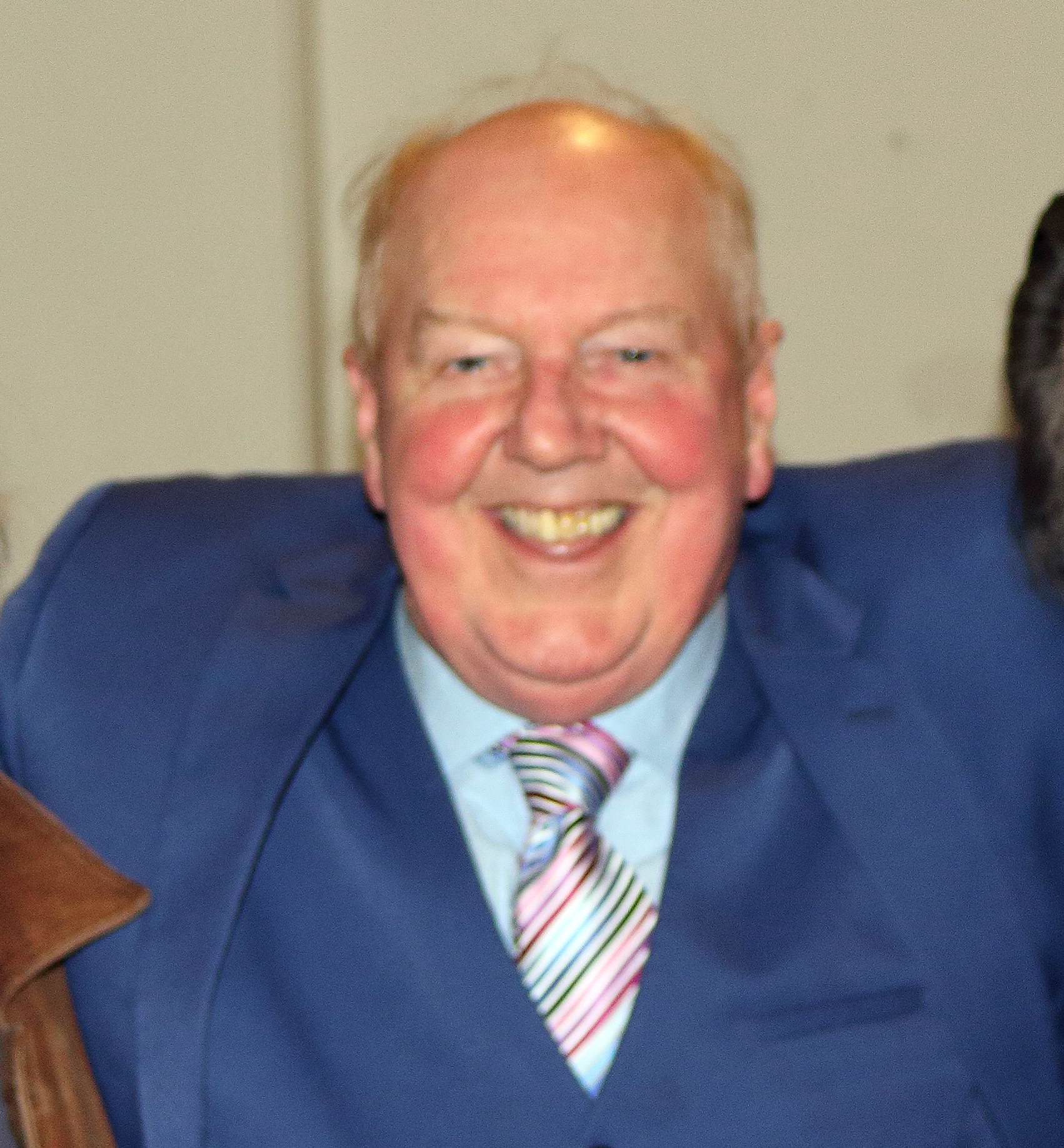
- Cricket in 2018
- Born: James Joseph Mulgrew; 17 October 1945; Cookstown, County Tyrone, Northern Ireland
- Died: 3 August 2026 (aged 80)
- Occupations: Comedian, radio and television personality, writer
- Years active: 1972–2026
- Spouse: May Tweedie (m. 1974)
- Children: 4

James Joseph Mulgrew (17 October 1945 – 3 August 2026), known professionally as Jimmy Cricket, was a Northern Irish comedian. He came to prominence in 1980 when he finished as runner‑up in Search for a Star, which led to appearances on The Good Old Days and Crackerjack! and later to his own television and radio series. Known for his catchphrase "and there's more", he continued performing into his later years.

== Early life ==
Cricket was born James Joseph Mulgrew on 17 October 1945 in Cookstown, County Tyrone, Northern Ireland, the youngest of six children of Frank Mulgrew and Philomena Mulgrew (née Conlon). Frank worked as an undertaker, publican, taxi driver and part-time auctioneer. After he died in 1953, Philomena took on several jobs to support the family, including work at the local Lucozade factory. Cricket was raised in Belfast and attended St Patrick's College, leaving school at 15.

== Career ==
After leaving school, Cricket worked in a range of casual jobs, including supermarket deliveries, labouring and cashier work in a betting shop. He also entered talent shows, performing comic dances or miming to pop songs.

In 1966, Cricket worked as a Redcoat at the Butlins Holiday camp in Mosney, County Meath. Over the next ten years, he worked at both Butlin's and Pontins, taking seasonal jobs and appearing on the northern comedy circuit. Some of his early jokes were borrowed, which was common at the time, but he gradually developed a distinctive stage persona. He chose the name "Jimmy Cricket" after the Walt Disney character Jiminy Cricket in Pinocchio. His television break came in 1980 when he finished as runner‑up in the final of London Weekend Television's Search for a Star. He later appeared in programmes such as The Good Old Days (1981), and Crackerjack! (1982). By 1983, his profile had grown to the point where he chose to headline his own shows on the Isle of Wight rather than take a season in Blackpool.

Cricket appeared on Bullseye in 1984, scoring 125 with nine darts for charity. He told Tony Green at the oche he forgot to add 60, saying 'and there's more'; Tony pretended he forgot and added the 60 to give a total of 185.

In 1985, Cricket was given his own television series, And There's More (named after his best-known catchphrase), produced by Central Television (also notable for including the first TV appearance by Rory Bremner); it ran for four series. Cricket also had his own radio series for BBC Radio 2 called Jimmy's Cricket Team, written by Eddie Braben and starring Peter Goodwright, Bill Pertwee and Noreen Kershaw. He featured in The Krankies Klub alongside the Krankies and Bobby Davro. Cricket appeared in numerous Royal Variety Performances. He also featured on numerous occasions on the BBC TV's long running TV show The Good Old Days. Cricket was the subject of an episode of This Is Your Life in 1987. He was one of a number of performers to appear in the video for the 2007 Comic Relief single, a cover of The Proclaimers' song "I'm Gonna Be (500 Miles)" by Matt Lucas as Andy Pipkin and Peter Kay as Brian Potter.

Cricket returned to Clacton-on-Sea in 2006 to star in the eight-week summer show Summer Special at the West Cliff Theatre. He also toured in the UK with other artists such as The Osmonds, Brotherhood of Man, and Gerry and the Pacemakers. He also toured in comedy themed shows with Cannon and Ball, Paul Daniels, Frank Carson, and The Krankies. In 2022, Cricket toured with Leah Bell in the Right Royal Knees Up Show for the Queen's Platinum Jubilee.

== Personal life and death ==
Cricket met May Tweedie while working at Pontins in Morecambe in 1972; she was employed there as a waitress and performed in a singing act with her sisters. They married in 1974 and had four children and four grandchildren.

Cricket died following a short illness on 3 August 2026, aged 80. His son, Father Frankie Mulgrew, said that the day before his death he wanted "the last rites twice, because like a good comedian he wanted an encore".

=== Tributes ===
Northern Irish comedian William Caulfield called Cricket "one of the most generous and lovely people to work with", while comedian Ted Robbins said he was "one of the last great comics". Comedian and TV presenter Roy Walker called him a "sincere wee fella" who "loved everyone and everyone loved him". Actor Christopher Biggins also paid tribute, calling Cricket "unbelievably fantastic, I don't think I met a nicer man ever".

== Style ==
Cricket's humour was entirely clean. A popular theme of his comedy is Irish logic, and the ubiquitous letter from his "Mammy". He almost always appeared in his trademark outfit of cut-off evening trousers, evening tailcoat, hat (given to him by the BBC to wear on The Good Old Days) and Wellington boots marked "L" and "R" for left and right, but each worn on the wrong foot. He frequently prefaced an anecdote with the catchphrase, "Ladies and gentlemen, [beat], come here [or c'mere]" as well as, "and there's more".

== Honours ==
On 18 September 2015, it was announced that Cricket had been awarded by the Roman Catholic Church, a papal knighthood (Order of St. Gregory the Great) from Pope Francis for his charity work.
