= The Municipal Journal =

- Cover of a November 2019 issue
- Editor: Heather Jameson
- Frequency: Weekly
- Publisher: Hemming Group
- Founded: 1893
- Country: United Kingdom
- Website: www.themj.co.uk
- ISSN: 0143-4187
- OCLC: 760925882

The Municipal Journal (also known as The MJ) is a weekly print news magazine and online publication covering local government and civic administration in the United Kingdom. It was established in 1893, under the title London. It is now published by the Hemming Group, with a stated target audience of "council chief executives and their teams of decision-makers in local authorities and allied sectors". The editor since 2011 has been Heather Jameson; she replaced Michael Burton.

The academic historian John R. Griffiths has described its role in its first two decades of existence as:

...to defend the Progressive agenda from Conservative (Moderate) attack, and [...] to play the role as the 'Hansard of local government.'

elsewhere, Griffiths notes:

...the significance of British world publications such as the Municipal Journal, appearing after 1890, in the facilitation of British world progressivism

From 1950-1952, it was published as the Municipal Journal and Public Works Engineer.

As well as news and opinion pieces, the journal has also published articles by academic researchers.

The journal also sponsors and hosts an annual "MJ Achievement Awards".
