= Jessica Martin (actor) =

English entertainer (born 1962)

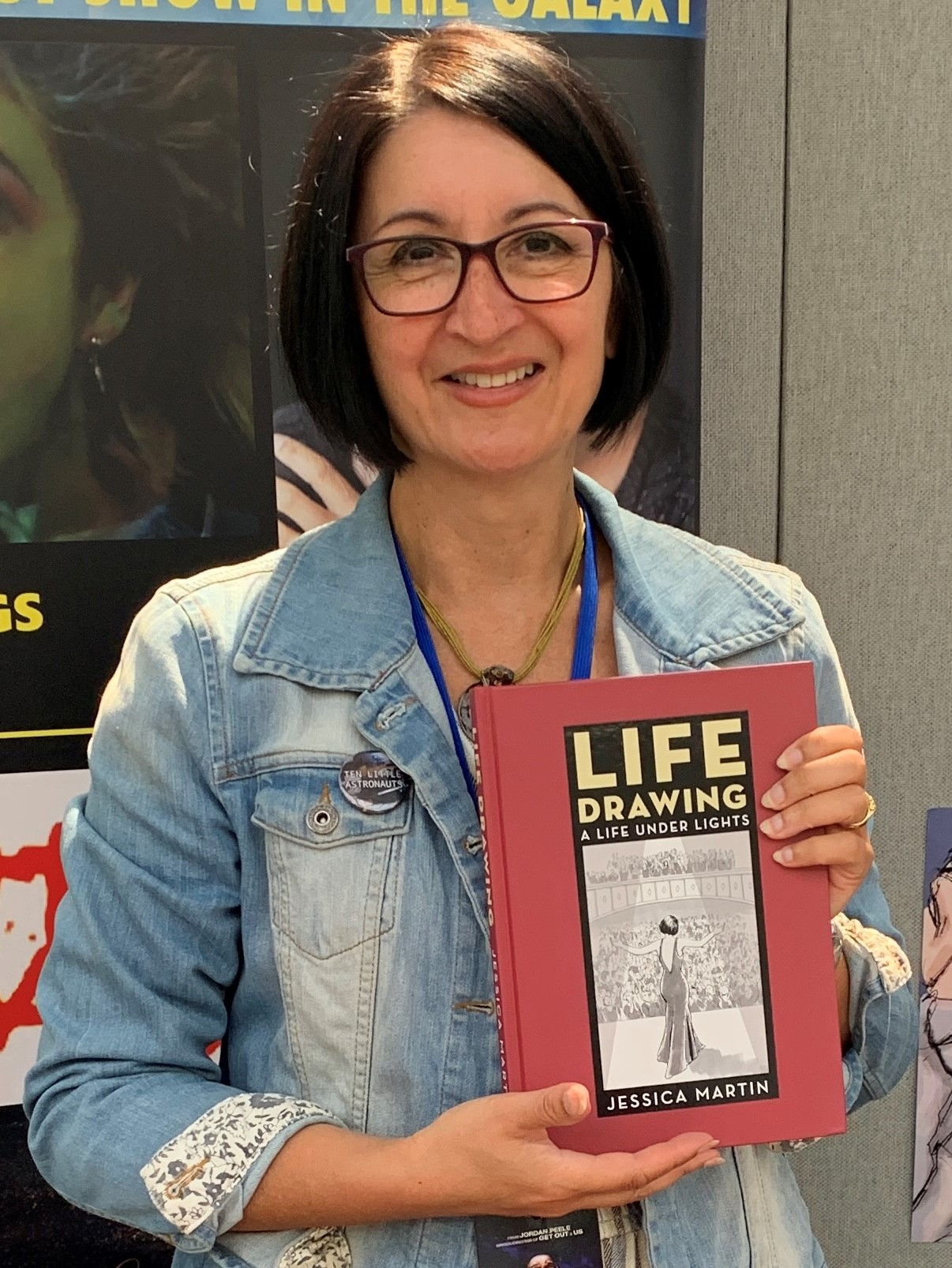
- Martin in 2022
- Born: 25 August 1962 (age 64); Fulham, London, England
- Education: Westfield College (BA (Hons)); Central School of Speech and Drama
- Occupation: Actress
- Years active: 1983–present

Jessica Cecelia Anna Maria Martin (born 25 August 1962) is an English actress, singer, and illustrator. Specialising as an impressionist, her television roles have included Spitting Image, Copy Cats and two series with Bobby Davro. She featured as the werewolf Mags in the 1988 Doctor Who serial The Greatest Show in the Galaxy, and provided the voice of the Queen in the 2007 Doctor Who Christmas special, "Voyage of the Damned".

On stage, Martin starred with Gary Wilmot in the West End show Me and My Girl for two years at the Adelphi Theatre and then on a national tour. She went on to play leading musical roles including Mabel in the 1996 production of Mack and Mabel at the Piccadilly Theatre, Nellie Forbush in South Pacific, Mrs Lovett in Sweeney Todd, Norma Desmond in Sunset Boulevard and the Lady of the Lake in the national tour of Spamalot. Her autobiography, as a graphic novel, Life Drawing: A Life Under Lights, was published in 2019.

== Life and career ==
=== Early life ===
Jessica Cecelia Anna Maria Martin was born on 25 August 1962. She graduated with a degree in English and Drama from Westfield College, London University and also studied at the Central School of Speech and Drama. Her first job, in 1983 when she was 21, was as a resident singer at St James's Hotel and Club. Her father, Placido Martin, was a cocktail pianist there. Speaking about her father in a 2019 interview, Martin said that he "was a complex character and much as I loved him, I wanted to give an honest portrayal [in my book] of how self-centred and destructive a 'creative' person can be."

=== Performance roles ===
Martin became an impressionist on the fringe circuit in 1983. In a 1984 review of her lunchtime show at the Palace Theatre, London bar, Roy Robert Smith of The Stage wrote that Martin was "armed with guts, determination, and talent [and] must surely soon gain the public recognition she deserves." He noted that she refined her material and renewed her material between shows, and particularly praised her impressions of Gloria Hunniford and Judy Garland. After seeing Martin perform at the Edinburgh Festival Fringe, Rory Bremner persuaded her to focus on impressions, and the pair appeared on radio together. In 1985, Martin was quoted as saying that she had only started doing impressions in public at the fringe for relaxation after appearing in performances Women of Troy there.

She auditioned for several roles, and became a regular voice cast member for the satirical puppet show Spitting Image. where her roles included Barbra Streisand, and members of the British royal family. She was then invited to audition for London Weekend Television's Copy Cats. Fellow team members included Bobby Davro, with whom she partnered for three series of his weekly show Bobby Davro's TV Weekly. In 1985 she joined Jimmy Cricket on the Central TV production And There's More. In the Nottingham Evening Post, a staff writer commented that Martin "is proving herself to be an accomplished actress, singer, dancer and mickey-taker – definitely a name to watch out for in the future." Martin and Bremner both quit Central TV in September 1985; Bremner had been offered his own BBC2 series, while Martin was due to join Davro in shows for TVS. Bremner and Martin toured UK theatres together in 1987, with a show of impressions.

In 1988, Milton Shulman of The Evening Standard described Martin performing "The Lady Is a Tramp" in Babes in Arms at the Maynardville Open-Air Theatre as "pert and saucy". Martin played the lead role of Dorothy in a touring production of The Wizard of Oz. Charles Barron of the Aberdeen Evening Express praised Martin's "exuberance" in the role, and wrote that she sang "with great charm".

From 1989, Martin and Gary Wilmot starred in the West End show Me and My Girl for two years at the Adelphi Theatre and then on a national tour. Martin went on to play leading musical roles including Mabel in the 1996 production of Mack and Mabel at the Piccadilly Theatre, Nellie Forbush in South Pacific, Mrs Lovett in Sweeney Todd, and Norma Desmond in Sunset Boulevard. She also guest-starred in the 1988 Doctor Who serial The Greatest Show in the Galaxy, starring Sylvester McCoy as the Doctor, in which she played a punk werewolf called Mags. Many years later, she provided the voice of the Queen in "Voyage of the Damned", the 2007 Christmas special, which starred David Tennant as the Doctor.

She played the Lady of the Lake in the national tour of Spamalot in 2011, Lottie Ames in Mack and Mabel, and Lottie Lacey in the revival of William Inge's The Dark at the Top of the Stairs (both 2012). In October 2015, Martin joined the cast of Elf: The Musical, playing the role of Emily Hobbs at the Dominion Theatre. In September 2016, she was featured in Robert J. Sherman's Bumblescratch playing the dual roles of Bethesda Bumblescratch and the Widow MacGregor at the Adelphi Theatre. She was named a Variety Club Celebrity Ambassador for her work in Bumblescratch and her other works.

Martin played role of Dame Shirley Porter in Shirleymander by Greg Evans at the Playground Theatre, London in 2018, she was nominated for the 2018 Offie for Best Female Performance in the Off W. In the Daily Telegraph, Ben Lawrence wrote: that Martin "best known for her impersonations .. does a terrific impression, but it is hard to reach inside the soul of this Rottweiler in a pussycat bow". She was niminated for the 2020 Offies for Lead Performance in a Musical - Mrs. Blitzstein in Blitz! at the Union Theatre, London in 2020.

Martin is a patron of the Music Hall Guild of Great Britain and America, and performed at the 50th anniversary Memorial Service for Lupino Lane at St Paul's, Covent Garden in 2009.

=== Audio work ===
Martin appeared on The Impressionists on BBC Radio 2 in 1985. She starred in a 1987 special for the same channel, Jessica Martin's Variety: The Gossip Column Murders. She was a voice actor for the PlayStation 2 game Dragon Quest VIII, and has also performed as a voice over artist for a range of animations and commercials. She has also recorded audio books including Vindication of the Rights of Men written by Mary Wollstonecraft. Martin has appeared in several Doctor Who audio dramas from Big Finish Productions.

=== Graphic novels ===
In 2010, Martin took up sketching for the first time since studying A-level art. The following year, whilst touring in Spamalot with Phill Jupitus, she showed him one of her sketches. Jupitus praised the sketch and suggested that Martin should do a graphic novel. Martin has referred to this as a "lightbulb moment." In 2012, Martin showed her work to established comics artist Mark Buckingham, who supported and encouraged her. Her first comic written and drawn by herself was It Girl about silent film actress Clara Bow. It was self-published in November 2013 and was selected in the "Ten Must Own Small-Press Comics 2013" by Broken Frontier.

Elsie Harris Picture Palace, which is set in the 1930s British film industry, was her first full-length graphic novel. It was shortlisted for the Myriad First Graphic Novel Prize 2014. In 2018, Martin illustrated a Doctor Who story, "Hill of Beans", that featured her character Mags from the television series. Life Drawing: A Life Under Lights, a graphic novel memoir about her life as an actress, singer and artist was published by Unbound in Spring 2019.

== Filmography ==
=== Theatre ===
Year	Title	Role	Venue	Ref.
1984	Mad Max's Cabaret	performer	Crazy Larry's, London	
1984	Jessica Martin	performer	Palace Theatre bar, London	
1985	Conkers Cabaret	performer	Bush Hotel, London	
1985–86	Cinderella (pantomime)	Cinderella	De Montfort Hall	
1986–87	Aladdin (pantomime)	Aladdin	Grand Theatre, Wolverhampton	
1986	Snow White and the Seven Dwarfs (pantomime)		Plymouth	
1987–88	Cinderella (pantomime)	Cinderella	Palace Theatre, Manchester	
1988	Babes in Arms	Bunny Byron	Maynardville Open-Air Theatre	
1988–89	The Wizard of Oz	Dorothy	Theatre Royal, Plymouth, and national tour	
1989–91	Me and My Girl	Sally Smith	Adelphi Theatre; national tour	
1994	The Court Jester	Alice Perrers	Warehouse Theatre	
1996	Mack and Mabel	Mabel Normand	Piccadilly Theatre	
1996–97	Peter Pan (pantomime)	Peter Pan	Wycombe Swan	
1997	South Pacific	Nellie Forbush	national tour	
2001	Sweeney Todd: The Demon Barber of Fleet Street	Mrs Lovett	Bridewell Theatre	
2004	Exclusive Yarns		New Wimbledon Studio	
2005–06	Cinderella (pantomime)	Fairy Godmother	Churchill Theatre, Bromley	
2006	Tracey Beaker Gets Real	Louise/Tracey's mum	national tour	
2009	Sunset Boulevard	Norma Desmond	Comedy Theatre	
2010	Sunset Bitch	numerous roles (one-woman show)	Waterloo East Theatre, London	
2011	Spamalot	Lady of the Lake	national tour	
2012	Mack and Mabel	Lottie Ames	Southwark Playhouse	
2012	The Dark at the Top of the Stairs	Lottie Lacey	Belgrade Theatre	
2014, 2015	Elf	Emily Hobbs	Theatre Royal, Plymouth; Dominion Theatre	
2016	Bumblescratch	Bethesda Bumblescratch/Widow MacGregor	Adelphi Theatre	
2016	Big the Musical	Mrs. Baskin	Theatre Royal Plymouth	
2017	Elf	Emily Hobbs	The Lowry	
2018	Shirleymander	Dame Shirley Porter	Playground Theatre, London	
2020	Blitz!	Mrs. Blitzstein	Union Theatre, London	
2022	Goldilocks and the Three Bears (pantomime)	Countess von Vinklebottom	Richmond Theatre	

=== Television ===
Year(s)	Programme	Role	Ref.
1985–86	Bobby Davro on the Box	cast member	
1985	And There's More	cast member	
1985	Wogan	guest	
1985	Live from Her Majesty's	performer	
1985–86	Copy Cats	cast member	
1986	Lift Off!	cast member	
1986	Tarby and Friends	guest	
1986	Good Morning Britain	guest	
1986	Les and Dustin's Laughter Show	performer	
1986	Summertime Special	guest	
1986	We Love TV	guest	
1986	Laugh Attack	cast member	
1986	3-2-1	guest	
1986	Des O'Connor Tonight	guest	
1986–87	Spitting Image	voice performer	
1987–88	Bobby Davro's TV Weekly	cast member	
1987	Tom O'Connor	guest	
1987	Royal Variety Show	performer	
1988	Catchphrase Celebrity Special	celebrity contestant	
1988	PC Pinkerton	voice performer	
1988	Doctor Who (serial The Greatest Show in the Galaxy)	Mags	
1993	The Art Sutter Show	guest	
1995	You Bet	guest panelist	
1995	Live from the Lilydrome	guest panelist	
2007	Doctor Who (episode "Voyage of the Damned")	The Queen (voice)	

=== Radio ===
Year	Title	Role	Notes	Ref.
1985	The Impressionists	performer	BBC Radio Two	
1992	The Gossip Column Murders	Cybil Liberty	Directed by Dirk Maggs	
1996	Ned Sherrin's Review of Revue	performer		
1996	In the Grip of the Glossies	reader		
1999	I Can Do That		Radio 4	
2002	Stage Mother, Sequinned Daughter	Alma Cogan	Directed by Marilyn Imrie	
2006	Jack Rosenthal's Last Act	Barbra Streisand	Directed by Maureen Lipman	

=== Film ===
Year	Title	Role	Ref.
1990	The Garden	Singer	
1999	Faeries	Helen, Skrawk (voices)	

=== Video games ===
Year	Title	Role	Ref.
1995	Flight of the Amazon Queen	Naomi, Secretary, Zombie Woman	
1996	Privateer 2: The Darkening	Female Space Communications	
2004	Dragon Quest VIII	Empyrea	

== Publications ==
Year	Title	Publisher	ISBN
2015	Elsie Harris Picture Palace	Miwk Publishing	ISBN 978-1908630384
2019	Life Drawing: A Life Under Lights	Unbound	ISBN 978-1783527588

== Awards and nominations ==
Year	Award	Category	Work	Result	Ref.
2014	Myriad First Graphic Novel Competition		Elsie Harris Picture Palace	Nominated	
2018	Offies	Best Female Performance	Shirleymander	Nominated	
2020	Offies	Full Run: Musicals: Lead Performance	Blitz!	Nominated	
