= Mill Hill Cemetery =

Cemetery in London, England

Coordinates: 51°36′44″N 0°13′22″W

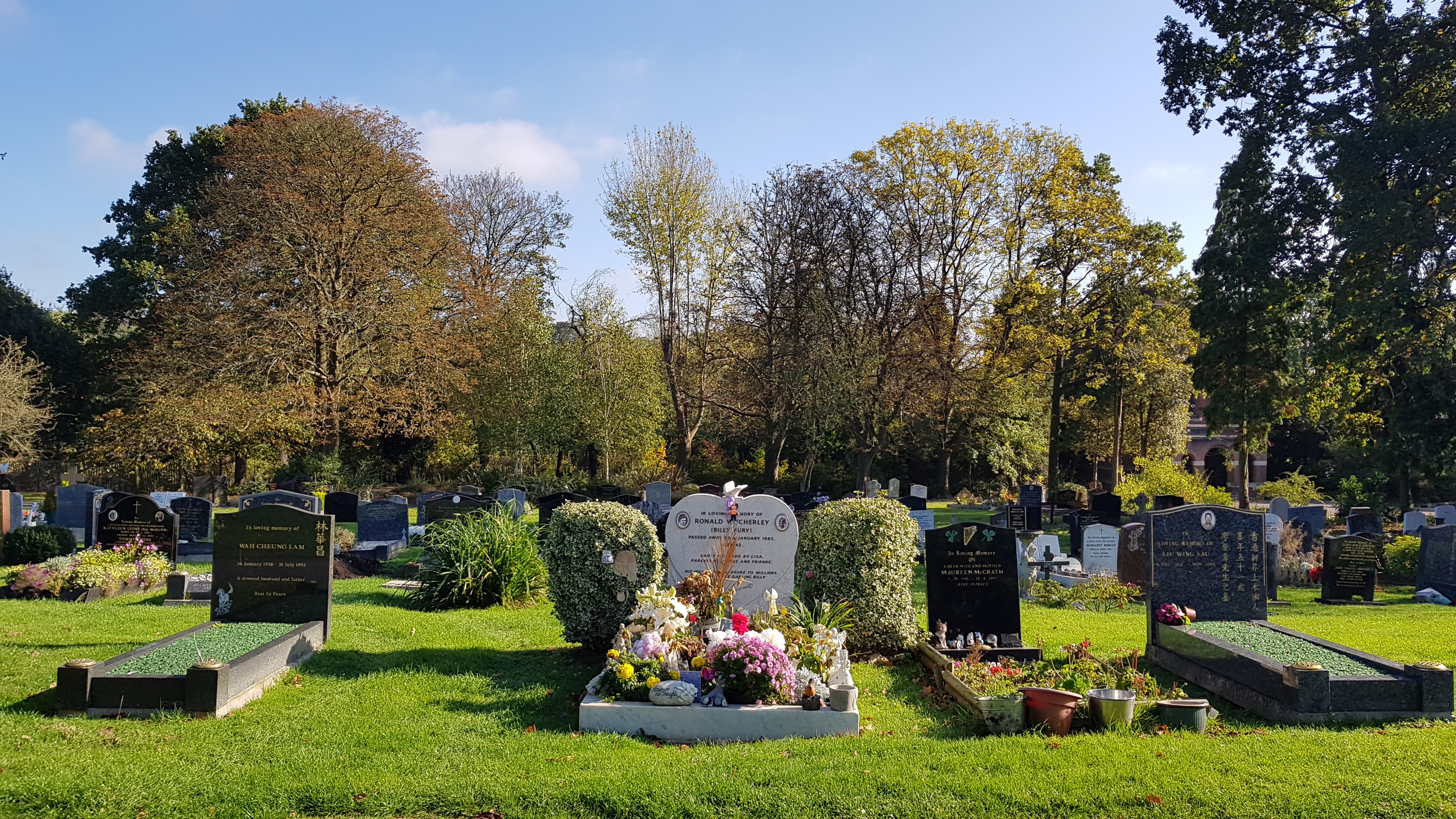

Mill Hill Cemetery is a non-denominational cemetery that opened in 1936. It is in Mill Hill, in the London Borough of Barnet, England.

The cemetery was originally called Paddington New Cemetery.

== History ==
In 1923, the Metropolitan Borough of Paddington decided to acquire land further out of London, as its existing cemetery in Willesden Lane, Kilburn (now known as Paddington Old Cemetery) was reaching capacity. The council acquired land in Mill Hill in 1933 and the cemetery was opened in 1936 as "Paddington New Cemetery".

A chapel was opened in 1937.

The cemetery contains a Commonwealth War Graves Commission burial site for 53 British and 254 Dutch casualties of World War II. After World War II, a small plot of land in the north of the cemetery was given by the Borough of Paddington to the Netherland War Graves Commission to form the Dutch National War Memorial in Great Britain, containing the remains of 254 Dutch servicemen and women killed during World War II, as well as 180 other names commemorated on larger memorial stones.

Burials from the southern part of churchyard of St Mary on Paddington Green Church that was destroyed to build the Marylebone Flyover in 1968 were reburied in this cemetery, their site marked by a plaque.

== Notable burials ==
- Owen Tudor Boyd, air marshal (1940–44), who served in both World Wars, and escaped from an Italian prisoner of war camp in 1943 (1889–1944)
- Bebe Daniels (Phyllis Virginia Daniels), American actress, singer, dancer, writer and producer (1901–1971)
- Princess Diane de Faucigny-Lucinge et Caligny, descendant of a French aristocratic family of the 13th century (1922–?)
- Billy Fury (Ronald Wycherley), rock & roll musician and songwriter (1940–1983)
- Daniel Lennox Fruchtman, stillborn son of Scottish singer-songwriter Annie Lennox (1988)
- John Laing (businessman), construction industry entrepreneur and businessman, and life president of John Laing & Son 1957–78 (1879–1978)
