= Shirley Porter =

British politician (1930–2026)

Dame Shirley Porter DBE

Lord Mayor of Westminster
- In office 1991–1992
- Leader: David Weeks
- Preceded by: David Avery
- Succeeded by: Cyril Nemeth

Leader of Westminster City Council
- In office 1983–1991
- Preceded by: David Cobbold
- Succeeded by: David Weeks

Councillor (Hyde Park Ward)
- In office 1974–1993

Personal details
- Born: Shirley Cohen; 29 November 1930 Clapton, London, England
- Died: 2 May 2026 (aged 95) Herzliya, Israel
- Party: Conservative
- Spouse: Leslie Porter (m. 1949; died 2005)
- Children: 2, including John
- Parent(s): Sir Jack Cohen; Sarah (Cissie) Fox
- Occupation: Politician, philanthropist, magistrate

Dame Shirley Porter, Lady Porter (née Cohen; 29 November 1930 – 2 May 2026) was a British politician who led Westminster City Council in London from 1983 to 1991, representing the Conservative Party. She was the daughter and heiress of Sir Jack Cohen, the founder of Tesco supermarkets. She was appointed Dame Commander of the Order of the British Empire in 1991 by John Major after delivering victory in Westminster for the Conservatives in the 1990 local elections.

While leader of Westminster City Council, Porter oversaw the "Building Stable Communities" policy – later described as the "homes for votes scandal" – and was subsequently accused of gerrymandering. The policy was judged illegal by the district auditor, and a surcharge of £27 million was levied on her in 1996. This was later raised to £42 million with interest and costs. She eventually settled in 2004, paying a final settlement of £12.3 million. Porter moved to Herzliya Pituah in Israel in 1994 during the inquiry into homes for votes. She bought a flat in London in 2006, but continued to spend most of her time in Israel. She was a governor of Tel Aviv University and, through the Porter Foundation, funded buildings and projects at the university.

== Background and political career ==
Porter was born Shirley Cohen in Upper Clapton, London, on 29 November 1930. Her father, Jacob Edward "Jack" Cohen, was the founder and owner of Tesco, and her mother was Sarah "Cissie" (née Fox), the daughter of a master tailor. Jack Cohen opened the first two Tesco stores in 1931 and by 1939 owned more than 100 stores across the country. The family lived at 7 Gunton Road, Hackney, a former council house in the East End of London that Jack had purchased from Hackney Council with the help of a £1,000 council loan.

Between 1939 and 1945 Porter boarded at Warren School For Girls in Worthing, Sussex. She then spent a year at La Ramée, a finishing school in Lausanne, Switzerland, followed by a year at St. Godric's Secretarial and Language School in Hampstead, London. She married Leslie Porter (10 July 1920 – 20 March 2005) on 26 June 1949 at the New West End Synagogue, Paddington, London. The couple had a daughter, Linda, and a son, John, who died in 2021. Leslie Porter joined the board of Tesco and became chairman in 1973. He was awarded a knighthood in 1983, with Porter becoming Lady Porter.

As a young married woman, Porter became involved with Jewish charities and played golf. In 1960, she was involved in the exposure of ten golf clubs in north London for discriminating against Jews.

Porter became a magistrate before entering local politics. Looking back at that time, she said "I remember my great lack of confidence, that I came in there and for the first time and I wasn't somebody's daughter, somebody's wife, somebody's mother. That's a very very mind-boggling feeling." In 1974, she was elected to Westminster City Council as a Conservative councillor for Hyde Park Ward and soon became involved in anti-litter campaigns.

In 1983, she was elected leader of Westminster City Council. Her initiatives and policies included, as well as the anti-litter campaign, the say no to drugs campaign and the plain English campaign; she was also involved in the abolition of the Greater London Council. After delivering victory in Westminster for the Conservatives in the 1990 local elections, she was appointed Dame Commander of the Order of the British Empire in the 1991 New Year Honours by prime minister John Major for "political and public service". In February 1991 she stood down as leader of the council and later that year became Lord Mayor of Westminster.

== Initiatives ==
=== Litter ===
Early in her career, Porter garnered national attention for her involvement and implementation of anti-litter campaigns in Westminster. In a 1985 interview with The Times' Shirley Lowe, Porter explained that litter was the reason why she had first entered local politics in 1974. She said: "I was walking along the street with a friend one day and it was filthy and I said, 'My God, somebody ought to do something about this,' and my friend said 'Why don't you?'" Despite sitting on the Highways and Works Committee, which was responsible for street cleaning and refuse collection, Porter did not mention litter again until late 1976 following a visit to Leningrad and Moscow. On her return she told the Paddington Mercury of her distaste for the Soviet regime but continued "one thing they must be given credit for is the cleanliness you find everywhere... I should hate to think that we need such a repressive regime to get our cities cleaned to their standards."

She soon joined the "Clean Up London" campaign. She encouraged hoteliers to join forces to attack the squalor that was affecting their businesses. Her enthusiasm also aided her election as vice-chairman of Highways and Works Committee on 28 June 1977. Her anti-litter activities within the CUL campaign continued. The Paddington Mercury described Porter as "fast winning a reputation as Paddington's Mrs Mops". She also mobilised schoolchildren in her campaign, raising brooms over their shoulders like rifles at the Lord Mayor's Show and singing "Pick up your litter and put it in the bin". By 1978, Porter had been elected as chairman of the Highways and Works Committee; in the same year, she launched the "Mr Clean Up" anti-litter campaign.

In January 1979, strikes began as part of the "Winter of Discontent". Rubbish collectors in Westminster went on strike and there was mounting waste in the streets. Porter opened 33 emergency rubbish dumps across the borough. Porter told press reporters that they would privatise rubbish collection if the strikers did not return to work. This practice was installed later on. Porter's successive litter campaigns included the "Cleaner London Campaign", followed by the "Cleaner City Initiative" in 1980. Activities included the deployment of additional street sweepers in particularly squalor-ridden areas of Westminster for a 2–3 week period. Porter also increased the regularity of rubbish collections and convinced local businesses to sponsor litter bins.

Porter threatened to resign in September 1980 when her department of Highways and Works faced a £1 million budget cut: "I will resign in the event that they cut our basic services and that means keeping our frontline services and a clean and litter-free city." In 1981, Porter launched "Operation Spring Clean", a cleaning blitz of the West End. In a 1991 appearance on Desert Island Discs, Porter said: "I really just feel so strongly that it isn't right for people to live in a dirty environment, and in an unpleasant environment. And it isn't just litter: I'm talking about the whole quality of life. When you live in pleasant surroundings, I think you are a better person."

=== Soho sex trade ===
In the late 1970s, Soho residents were troubled by the growing sex industry. Between 1965 and 1982, the number of sex shops had risen from 31 to 65. In 1982 Porter became Chairman of the General Purposes Committee and set to work in alleviating the issue. Porter and her aides soon proceeded with a fact-finding mission. The Local Government (Miscellaneous Provisions) Act 1982 stipulated that Westminster could shut down any pornographer that did not hold a licence. Porter soon decided that the number of sex shops in Soho would be limited to 20. The legislation also ensured that successful applicants would require a minimum of six months' residency in the UK as well as a clean police record. It was also legislated that sex shops would have to conceal their practice with blinds. Other measures included the requirement of business owners to keep a register of their staff. By February 1983, just 13 sex shops remained in Soho.

== Westminster cemeteries scandal ==
In January 1987, Westminster City Council sold the out-of-borough cemeteries Hanwell Cemetery, East Finchley Cemetery and Mill Hill Cemetery for £1 to save on maintenance costs. The sale included three lodge-houses, a flat, a crematorium and 5 ha (12 acres) of prime development land. Within weeks of the sale, it became apparent that the new owners had no interest in the upkeep of the cemeteries, leading to complaints from relatives about their condition and investigations by the district auditor, John Magill, and local government ombudsman, David Yardley. Both reports were critical of the council, with the local government ombudsman finding the council guilty of maladministration. In 1992, the council agreed to buy back the cemeteries for more than £4 million, not including the valuable land and buildings that had been part of the original sale.

== Homes for votes scandal ==
=== Building Stable Communities ===
The Conservatives were narrowly re-elected in Westminster in the 1986 local council elections with a majority that dropped from 26 to four. Fearing that they would eventually lose control unless there was a permanent change in the social composition of the borough, Porter instituted a policy known as Building Stable Communities as a cover for implementing secretive projects designed to bring more Conservative voters into marginal wards in Westminster. The wards selected were Bayswater, Little Venice, Millbank, St James's, Victoria, Cavendish, West End and Hamilton Terrace. The aim of the Building Stable Communities policy was to sell 250 designated council homes a year in the key wards in the belief that home-owners would be more likely to vote Conservative than council tenants. The properties were sold at discounted prices.

Another vital part of Building Stable Communities policy was the removal of homeless voters and others who lived in hostels and were perceived less likely to vote Conservative, such as students and nurses, from the City of Westminster. As the City Council found it more and more difficult to move homeless people outside Westminster, the Building Stable Communities programme switched to moving homeless people to safe wards in the city, where their votes would have less impact. In 1989, more than 100 homeless families were removed from hostels in marginal wards and placed in the Hermes and Chantry Point tower blocks in the safe Labour ward of Harrow Road. These blocks contained a dangerous form of asbestos, and should have been either cleaned up or demolished a decade before but had remained in place owing to funding disputes between the City Council and the by now abolished Greater London Council. Many of the flats had had their heating and sanitation systems destroyed by the council to prevent their use as drug dens; others had indeed been taken over by heroin users and still others had pigeons making nests out of asbestos, with the level in flats in Hermes and Chantry Points well above safe norms. One former homeless refuge was sold off at a discounted price to private developers and converted into private flats for young professional people at a cost to the ratepayer of £2.6 million.

Labour councillors and members of the public referred the key wards policy to the district auditor to check on its legality. In 1990, the Conservatives were re-elected in Westminster in a landslide election victory in which they won all but one of the wards targeted by Building Stable Communities. Porter stood down as Leader of the council in 1991, and served in the ceremonial position of Lord Mayor of Westminster in 1991–1992. She resigned from the council in 1993, and retired to live in Israel with her husband.

=== Court cases and surcharge ===
On 9 May 1996, after a legal investigation, the district auditor issued a decision that the Building Stable Communities policy had been illegal, and ordered Porter and five others to pay the costs of the illegal policy, which were calculated as £31.6 million. A few days later, the scandal was discussed in Parliament. The judgment was upheld by the High Court in 1997 with liability reduced solely to Porter and her Deputy Leader, David Weeks. In 1998, BBC Two screened a documentary, Looking for Shirley, which profiled Westminster City Council's efforts to recover the surcharge and Porter's efforts to move her estimated £70m in assets into offshore accounts and overseas investments.

The Court of Appeal overturned the judgment by a majority decision in 1999, but the House of Lords unanimously reinstated it in 2001, with a surcharge of £27 million levied on Porter. Including interest, the surcharge now stood at £43.3 million. In Israel, Porter transferred substantial parts of her great wealth to other members of her family and into secret trusts to avoid the charge and subsequently claimed assets of only £300,000. After the judgment in the House of Lords, Porter submitted an appeal to the European Court of Human Rights. The appeal was ruled inadmissible in April 2003.

=== Final agreement ===
In 2004, the still Conservative controlled Westminster City Council and the Audit Commission announced that an agreement had been reached with Porter for a payment of £12.3 million in settlement of the debt. The decision was appealed by Labour members on the council and district auditor Les Kidner began another investigation. The ensuing report, issued in March 2007, accepted the position of the council that further action would not be cost effective and stated that "'Overall, the council acted reasonably in the recovery action that it took."

In November 2009, ahead of a BBC radio play, Shirleymander, dramatising the principal events of Porter's time as leader at Westminster City Council, council leader Colin Barrow apologised unreservedly to all those affected by the "gerrymandering" policy. He criticised Porter by name for the first time and added that her actions were "the opposite of the council's policies today". Following reports in 2006 that Porter had bought a £1.5 million flat in Mayfair, the then Mayor of London, Ken Livingstone, asked Lord Goldsmith, the Attorney General, to commence an investigation into whether Porter committed perjury or other offences during the conduct of the homes for votes case.

== Life in Israel ==
Porter moved to Herzliya Pituah, Israel, in 1994 during the inquiry into homes for votes. After the final settlement, she bought a flat in Mayfair in 2006 but continued to spend most of her time in Israel.

Porter died in Herzliya on 2 May 2026, at the age of 95.

== Philanthropy ==
In 1970, Porter and her husband used family money to set up the Porter Foundation, which has funded projects in Israel and the UK. Tel Aviv University has received funds to establish buildings and projects including the Porter Institute for Poetics and Semiotics, the Shirley and Leslie Porter School of Cultural Studies and the Porter School of Environmental Studies. Other projects funded in Israel include a day-care centre for elderly people and a nautical sports centre. In the UK, beneficiaries of the Porter Foundation include the National Portrait Gallery, where a small room is named the Porter Gallery, and the Victoria and Albert Museum. Porter had served as a governor of Tel Aviv University. She was also involved with various environmental projects in Israel. An obituary in the Jewish Chronicle said that the Porter Foundation was a "generous benefactor to academic institutions and environmental projects" in Israel.

== Public image and portrayals ==
In a review for The Guardian of Nothing Like a Dame, Porter's biography by journalist Andrew Hosken, Nicholas Lezard described her in the following terms: "She remains, by a considerable margin, the most corrupt British public figure in living memory, with the possible exception of Robert Maxwell". In the London Review of Books review of the same book, Jenny Diski called the Homes for Votes scandal Porter's "biggest, stupidest and most cynical act of corruption". Diski, without justifying Porter's behaviour, accused many of Porter's critics of "snobbery and an undeclared racism". She cited the "echo of something more than simple class snobbery in the judgments made of her voice and decor".

In November 2009, BBC Radio 4 broadcast the radio play Shirleymander, which dramatised the events of Porter's time as leader of Westminster City Council, with the role of Porter played by Tracy-Ann Oberman. In 2018, a stage adaptation of the play starred Jessica Martin as Porter and had a brief run at the Playground Theatre in North Kensington, west London.

== See also ==
- Westminster City Council v Duke of Westminster
