= The Paul Daniels Magic Show series 2 =

The Paul Daniels Magic Show
- Season 2
- 1980 titlecard
- Starring: Paul Daniels
- No. of episodes: 6 + 1 Special

Release
- Original network: BBC
- Original release: 13 October – 24 December 1980

Series chronology
- ← Previous; Series 1 Next → 2

The Paul Daniels Magic Show is a British magic show presented by entertainer and magician Paul Daniels that aired on BBC1 from 9 June 1979 to 18 June 1994. At its peak in the 1980s, the show regularly attracted viewing figures of 15 million and was sold to 43 countries.

Series 2 consisted of 6 regular episodes and 1 Christmas Special.

== Episodes ==
No. in series	Featured Guests	Directed by	Magic Associate	Original release date
1	Harry Lorayne, Vito Lupo, The Paul Daniels Magic Set	John Hughes	Ali Bongo	13 September 1980
2	Shari Lewis, The Morettis, The Paul Daniels Magic Set	John Hughes	Ali Bongo	20 September 1980
3	Mary Chipperfield's Chimpanzees, The Koziaks, The Paul Daniels Magic Set, Frances Willard (magician), Glen Falkenstein	John Hughes	Ali Bongo	27 September 1980
4	Rob Murray, Ioni, Nelson Elliott, The Paul Daniels Magic Set, Professor Percy Press Ii, Cher Adeyinka, Jacki Barron	John Hughes	Ali Bongo	4 October 1980
5	Jeffery Atkins, Otto Wessely, The Paul Daniels Magic Set, Teddy Peiro and Patricio	John Hughes	Ali Bongo	11 October 1980
6	Geroku, The Morettis, The Paul Daniels Magic Set	John Hughes	Ali Bongo	18 October 1980
Special	Harry Blackstone, Compagnie Philippe Genty, Michael Mcgiveney, Lilly Yokoi, Cher Adeyinka, Daryl Black, Lindsey Danvers	John Hughes	Ali Bongo	22 December 1980
