= List of Ant & Dec's Saturday Night Takeaway episodes =

Ant & Dec's Saturday Night Takeaway (referred to simply as Saturday Night Takeaway, Takeaway or SNT) is a British television variety show, presented by Ant & Dec, broadcast on ITV from 2002 to 2009, and again from 2013 to 2024. Each episode focuses on a variety of segments heavily influenced by previous Saturday night light entertainment shows, most notably Noel's House Party and Don't Forget Your Toothbrush, and with some paying homage to Saturday night TV of the past, such as Opportunity Knocks, and range from pranks, humorous entertainment, games, and musical acts.

The following lists each series, a brief summary of segments, including changes to what was used, appearances by guests, and the ratings given for each episode; from the fifth series onwards, the list includes the scores from the "Ant vs. Dec" segment, the seventh series onwards lists information on the guest announcers that appeared in each episode following the introduction of this format to the programme, and the tenth series onwards lists the closing performances used in each episode.

== Series overview ==
Series	Episodes	Start date	End date	Ave. viewers (millions)	Sponsor
1	6	8 June 2002	13 July 2002	4.76	Siemens
2	11	11 January 2003	22 March 2003	7.91	Coca-Cola
3	6	13 March 2004	17 April 2004	7.86	Coca-Cola
4	6	2 October 2004	6 November 2004	7.97	Imperial Leather
5	10	12 February 2005	16 April 2005	7.68	KFC
Special		24 December 2005		6.22	KFC
6	6	16 September 2006	21 October 2006	7.22	Greene King
7	6	8 September 2007	13 October 2007	6.25	Heinz Big Eat
8	6	16 February 2008	22 March 2008	7.27	Birds Eye
9	6	14 February 2009	21 March 2009	6.63	Birds Eye
10	7	23 February 2013	6 April 2013	7.82	Morrisons
11	7	22 February 2014	5 April 2014	7.61	Morrisons
12	7	21 February 2015	4 April 2015	7.00	Morrisons
13	7	20 February 2016	2 April 2016	7.78	Suzuki
14	7	25 February 2017	8 April 2017	8.02	Suzuki
15	6	24 February 2018	7 April 2018	8.43	Suzuki
16	7	22 February 2020	4 April 2020	8.54	Deliveroo
17	7	20 February 2021	3 April 2021	7.41	National Lottery
18	7	19 February 2022	9 April 2022	5.99	National Lottery
19	7	25 February 2023	8 April 2023	5.70	Rightmove
20	7	24 February 2024	13 April 2024	4.92	Lotto

== Episodes ==
=== Series 1 (2002) ===
The first series was aired during Summer 2002, running for six episodes from 8 June to 13 July, and averaging around 4.76 million viewers. It featured a notable number of segments, some of which were dropped after the series had finished broadcasting. The series featured early formats of two notable games that would be later revised for use in future series - "Grab the Ads" and "Win the Ads". Sponsorship: Siemens.

Ratings

Episode	Date	Viewers (millions)	ITV weekly ranking
1	8 June 2002	5.51	18
2	15 June 2002	4.97	23
3	22 June 2002	4.84	26
4	29 June 2002	4.62	21
5	6 July 2002	4.96	20
6	13 July 2002	3.64	30

=== Series 2 (2003) ===
The second series aired during Winter - early Spring 2003, running for eleven episodes from 11 January to 22 March, and averaging around 7.91 million viewers. This series saw the introduction of four new segments - "Opportunity Knocks, Again", "What's Next?", "Little Ant and Dec", and "Ant & Dec Undercover" in which the original format rotated between audience members and celebrities - as well as the return of "Grab the Ads" from the previous series, but with a revised format. Sponsorship: Coca-Cola.

Ratings

Episode	Date	Viewers (millions)	ITV weekly ranking
1	11 January 2003	7.51	17
2	18 January 2003	7.45	18
3	25 January 2003	7.69	16
4	1 February 2003	7.48	17
5	8 February 2003	7.73	15
6	15 February 2003	7.69	14
7	22 February 2003	8.21	13
8	1 March 2003	8.75	14
9	8 March 2003	9.01	15
10	15 March 2003	7.56	14
11	22 March 2003	7.89	15

Ant & Dec Undercover

Episode	Date	Celebrity	Prank
1	11 January 2003	Phillip Schofield; Fern Britton	German Pop Idol winners
2	18 January 2003	Audience Member Andrea	Fake Job Interview
3	25 January 2003	Simon Cowell	Fake American Idol audition
4	1 February 2003	Audience Member Peter	Jamaican Fortune Teller
5	8 February 2003	Lorraine Kelly	Pensioners going out with younger women
6	15 February 2003	Audience Member Sam	Jamaican Spa Treatment
7	22 February 2003	General Public	Pensioners out and about
8	1 March 2003	Emmerdale cast	Jamaican extras
9	8 March 2003	Caprice Bourret	Fake preschool show (The Ploppies)
10	15 March 2003	Hayley Evetts	Fake preschool show (The Ploppies)
11	22 March 2003	Various	Best-of compilation

=== Series 3 (2004) ===
The third series aired during Spring 2004, running for six episodes from 13 March to 17 April, and averaging around 7.86 million viewers. The series saw the introduction of a new segment entitled "Saturday Cash Takeaway", that was run for just this series only alongside the other segments from the previous series. Sponsorship: Coca-Cola.

Jim Didn't Fix It!

Episode	Date	Audience Members	Fix-it Dream
2	20 March 2004	20 random people	20 random childhood dreams (with an appearance from Jimmy Savile)

Little Ant & Dec

Episode	Date	Interview
1	13 March 2004	Kevin Costner
2	20 March 2004	Richard Branson of Virgin Airlines
3	27 March 2004	Westlife
4	3 April 2004	Sarah Michelle Gellar
5	10 April 2004	Victoria Beckham
6	17 April 2004	Katie Price aka Jordan

Ant & Dec Undercover

Episode	Date	Celebrity	Prank
1	13 March 2004	Kerry Katona	Takeaway Hospital
2	20 March 2004	Pete Waterman	Train Enthusiast of the Year Award
3	27 March 2004	Bruno Langley; Sally Lindsay	Japanese Coronation Street ripoff
4	3 April 2004	John Fashanu	Fake episode of Celebrities Under Pressure
5	10 April 2004	Jonathan Wilkes	Fake preschool show (The Ploppies)
6	17 April 2004	Blue	Takeaway Hospital

What's Next?

Episode	Date	Celebrity	Challenge
1	13 March 2004	Matthew Kelly (via satellite); Brenda Ganda (in studio)	Stars in Their Eyes Simulator
2	20 March 2004	Paul Usher; Suranne Jones	Bonanza Wild West Showdown
3	27 March 2004	Susie Blake; Keith Duffy; Bruce Jones; Desi Valentine	Germany Bottomslappers
5	10 April 2004	Magnus Magnusson	Mastermind Battle of the Easter Eggheads
6	17 April 2004	Steve Whitmire as Kermit the Frog	Performing rendition of "Everybody Needs Somebody to Love" by The Blues Brothers

Ratings

Episode	Date	Viewers (millions)	ITV weekly ranking
1	13 March 2004	9.09	13
2	20 March 2004	7.08	18
3	27 March 2004	7.97	15
4	3 April 2004	7.80	14
5	10 April 2004	7.37	17
6	17 April 2004	7.86	15

=== Series 4 (2004) ===
The fourth series aired during Autumn 2004, running for six episodes from 2 October to 6 November, and averaging around 7.97 million viewers. While "Jim Didn't Fix It" and "Home Run" were dropped prior to this series, many of the other segments returned, while a new segment was created, entitled "Saturday Night Pub Olympics", which was used for this series only. Sponsorship: Imperial Leather.

Ratings

Episode	Date	Viewers (millions)	ITV weekly ranking
1	2 October 2004	8.23	13
2	9 October 2004	8.01	16
3	16 October 2004	8.17	13
4	23 October 2004	8.60	13
5	30 October 2004	7.55	16
6	6 November 2004	7.27	16

=== Series 5 (2005) ===
The fifth series was aired during late Winter - early Spring 2005, running for ten episodes from 12 February to 16 April, and averaging around 7.68 million viewers. This series is notable for the production team revamping the "What's Next" segment, and transforming it into a head-to-head contest between the presenters entitled "Ant vs. Dec", that was presented by Kirsty Gallacher. This series saw Dec involved in an accident during filming of a game being pre-recorded for an episode's "Ant vs. Dec", in which the presenter was injured while attempting a motorbike stunt jump. The accident left him with a broken right thumb and broken left elbow, leaving him to have his left arm in a sling for a few weeks afterwards. In its first run, the contest between the presenters ended with Dec winning 6–5. Sponsorship: KFC.

Ratings

Episode	Date	Viewers (millions)	ITV weekly ranking
1	12 February 2005	8.46	11
2	19 February 2005	7.83	14
3	26 February 2005	7.53	14
4	5 March 2005	7.46	17
5	12 March 2005	8.67	10
6	19 March 2005	8.49	14
7	26 March 2005	7.47	14
8	2 April 2005	6.23	18
9	9 April 2005	7.26	14
10	16 April 2005	7.37	14
Christmas special	24 December 2005	6.22	16

Ant vs Dec

Show	Date	Challenge	Winner	Ant's score	Dec's score
1	12 February 2005	Gladiators	Ant	1	0
2	19 February 2005	The Tightrope	Ant	2	0
3	26 February 2005	Dog Training	Dec	2	1
4	5 March 2005	Escapology	Dec	2	2
5	12 March 2005	Ring of Fire	Draw	3	3
6	19 March 2005	Memory Test	Dec	4	3
7	26 March 2005	Royal Wedding Song with G4 (guest presented by Sir Trevor McDonald)	Dec	4	4
8	2 April 2005	Darts	Ant	5	4
9	9 April 2005	Ventriloquism	Dec	5	5
10	16 April 2005	Penalty shootout	Dec	5	6
Christmas special	24 December 2005	Hogmanay challenge	Ant	(wins the special little cup)	(lost)

=== Series 6 (2006) ===
The sixth series aired during Autumn 2006, running for six episodes from 16 September to 21 October, and averaging around 7.22 million viewers. This series saw "Ant & Dec Undercover" being dropped from the show, while introducing two new segments - a second contest entitled "Beat the Boys", focusing on the presenters competing against a different pair of celebrities each episode; and a new cash prize game entitled "Jiggy Bank". This series' contest between the presenters ended on a draw of 3-3, leading to a tiebreaker game of mini-golf putt-off to be held in the final episode, to determine the winner. The game ended with Dec winning and becoming the winner of this series' contest, as a result. Sponsorship: Greene King. Series Announcer: Noddy Holder

Ratings

Episode	Date	Viewers (millions)	ITV weekly ranking
1	16 September 2006	7.58	7
2	23 September 2006	5.21	21
3	30 September 2006	7.37	11
4	7 October 2006	7.33	12
5	14 October 2006	7.64	11
6	21 October 2006	8.21	9

Ant vs. Dec – "The Rematch"

Show	Date	Challenge	Winner	Ant's score	Dec's score
1	16 September 2006	Abseiling	Dec	0	1
2	23 September 2006	Sumo Wrestling	Ant	1	1
3	30 September 2006	Lumberjack	Dec	1	2
4	7 October 2006	Rowing	Ant	2	2
5	14 October 2006	Cake Baking	Dec	2	3
6	21 October 2006	Forming a Boyband	Ant	3	3

Beat the Boys

Show	Date	Couple	Ant & Dec's Car & Time	Challenger's Car & Time	Winner
1	16 September 2006	Phillip Schofield & Fern Britton	Stretched Limo (3:23)	Caravan (3:25)	Ant & Dec
3	30 September 2006	Trinny Woodall & Susannah Constantine	Girly Jeep (3:16)	Boy Racer (3:15)	Trinny & Susannah
4	7 October 2006	Ben Shephard & Penny Smith	Ice-Cream Van (4:01)	Camp-A-Van (3:59)	Ben & Penny
5	14 October 2006	Harry Hill & Al Murray	Wedding Car (6:18)	Police Car (3:28)	Harry & Al
6	21 October 2006	Wendi Peters & Jennie McAlpine	Hippy Car (3:21)	London Taxi Cab (4:25)	Ant & Dec

=== Series 7 (2007) ===
The seventh series aired during Autumn 2007, running for six episodes from 8 September to 13 October, and averaging around 6.25 million viewers. It was the first series to see the introduction of a new element in the format of the show, in the form of a celebrity announcer, with each episode featuring its own celebrity invited to take on the role. This series also saw "Little Ant & Dec" being dropped from the show. This series' contest between the presenters ended with Dec winning by 5–1. Sponsorship: Heinz Big Eat.

Ratings

Episode	Date	Viewers (millions)	ITV weekly ranking
1	8 September 2007	6.59	10
2	15 September 2007	6.76	8
3	22 September 2007	7.16	8
4	29 September 2007	6.56	13
5	6 October 2007	4.84	18
6	13 October 2007	5.60	16

Ant vs. Dec – "This Time, It's Personal"

Show	Date	Challenge	Winner	Ant's score	Dec's score
1	8 September 2007	Speed Skating	Dec	0	1
2	15 September 2007	Spelling Bee	Dec	0	2
3	22 September 2007	60m Sprint Hurdles	Dec	0	3
4	29 September 2007	Weather Forecasting	Ant	1	3
5	6 October 2007	Holding Breath Underwater	Dec	1	4
6	13 October 2007	Freddie Mercury Queen Tribute Act	Dec	1	5

Beat the Boys

Show	Date	Couple	Ant & Dec's Car & Time	Challenger's Car & Time	Winner
1	8 September 2007	Tina O'Brien & Ryan Thomas	Starsky & Hutch Stunt Car (3:52)	Cagney & Lacey Police Cruiser (3:57)	Ant & Dec
2	15 September 2007	Max Beesley & Jonathan Wilkes	Safari Jeep (4:02)	Ambulance (4:00)	Max & Jonathan
3	22 September 2007	Alan Carr & Justin Lee Collins	Old People's Car (4:26)	Catering Van (4:57)	Ant & Dec
4	29 September 2007	Fearne Cotton & Holly Willoughby	Army Jeep (6:38)	Beach Buggy (6:18)	Fearne & Holly
5	6 October 2007	Eamonn Holmes & Ruth Langsford	Beach Car (7:14)	New York Taxi Cab (9:14)	Ant & Dec

Celebrity Announcers

- 8 September: Simon Pegg
- 15 September: Daniel Radcliffe
- 22 September: Quentin Tarantino
- 29 September: Christian Slater
- 6 October: Harry Hill (You've Been Framed! and Harry Hill's TV Burp)
- 13 October: Katie Price & Peter Andre

=== Series 8 (2008) ===
The eighth series aired during late Winter - early Spring 2008, running for six episodes from 16 February to 22 March, and averaging around 7.27 million viewers. This series saw the game "Jiggy Bank" being replaced with a new cash prize game entitled "The Mouse Trap".

For this series' contest between the presenters, the format was modified so that each presenter could be joined by a team of celebrities to help them win games. Whoever lost had to nominate a celebrity from their team who would be eliminated from future games. Ant's team consisted of: Paul Daniels' wife Debbie McGee; actress and singer & Doctor Who actor Bonnie Langford; dancer Wayne Sleep; Jason "J" Brown from Five; and ex-Steps member Lee Latchford-Evans (due to "personal reasons" Ant's initial choice of Lee Ryan from Blue could not take part as planned). Dec's team consisted of: magician Paul Daniels; singer Sonia; The X Factor contestant Chico Slimani; TV presenter Melinda Messenger; and former footballer Lee Sharpe. The contest between the teams ended on a draw of 3-3, leading to a tiebreaker game of a basketball shoot-out to be held in the final episode to determine the winner. For this game, each presenter nominated a team member to play it, and was won by Dec's team, leading to the presenter winning this series' contest as a result. Sponsorship: Birds Eye.

Ratings

Episode	Date	Viewers (millions)	ITV weekly ranking
1	16 February 2008	6.41	15
2	23 February 2008	7.29	15
3	1 March 2008	7.29	15
4	8 March 2008	7.48	14
5	15 March 2008	7.76	10
6	22 March 2008	7.38	10

Ant vs. Dec – The Teams

Show	Date	Challenge	Winner	Ant's score	Dec's score	Eliminated
1	16 February 2008	Royal Navy Assault Course	Dec	0	1	Wayne Sleep
2	23 February 2008	Dodgeball	Ant	1	1	Sonia
3	1 March 2008	Bobsleighing	Ant	2	1	Paul Daniels
4	8 March 2008	Barber Shop Quartet	Ant	3	1	Melinda Messenger
5	15 March 2008	Indoor Bowls	Dec	3	2	Debbie McGee
6	22 March 2008	Tap Dancing	Dec	3	3	Bonnie Langford

Beat the Boys - "Extreme"

Show	Date	Couple	Ant & Dec's Car & Time	Challenger's Car & Time	Winner
2	23 February 2008	David Dickinson & Lorne Lesley	Disco 1 (4:16)	Post Van (7:45)	Ant & Dec
4	8 March 2008	Duncan James & Tara Palmer-Tomkinson	Punked Mini (8:14)	Pest remover van (6:30)	Duncan & Tara
5	15 March 2008	Andrew Castle & Kate Garraway	Goth Hearse (5.18)	American Hotrod (6.14)	Ant & Dec

Celebrity Announcers

- 16 February: Will Ferrell
- 23 February: Uma Thurman
- 1 March: Jeff Goldblum
- 8 March: Dwayne "The Rock" Johnson
- 15 March: Jessica Alba
- 22 March: Kate Hudson

=== Series 9 (2009) ===
The ninth series aired during late Winter - early Spring 2009, running for six episodes from 14 February to 21 March, and averaging around 6.63 million viewers. For this series, "Beat the Boys" was replaced by a new segment entitled "Escape from Takeaway Prison", which involved celebrities competing against each other in a series of games.

For this series' contest between the presenters, each were once more joined by a team of celebrities. Ant's team consisted of: former British politician Lembit Öpik; comedian Brian Conley; singer and TV presenter Liz McClarnon; singer and TV presenter Jonathan Wilkes; and actress and TV presenter Yvette Fielding. Dec's team consisted of: former boy band Blue member Antony Costa; former British politician Edwina Currie; singer Sinitta; comedian Bobby Davro; and hair stylise Nicky Clarke. The contest ended on a draw of 3-3, leading to a tiebreaker game of tincan alley to be held in the final episode to determine the winner. For this game, each team took it in turns to knock down as many cans as they could, with one ball thrown by each presenter and the two remaining members of their team. The game was won by Dec's team, leading to the presenter winning this series' contest as a result. This segment featured a guest appearance by Brian Blessed during the second and final challenges.

Sponsorship: Birds Eye.

Ratings

Episode	Date	Viewers (millions)	ITV weekly ranking
1	14 February 2009	7.74	12
2	21 February 2009	6.81	15
3	28 February 2009	6.23	16
4	7 March 2009	7.00	14
5	14 March 2009	5.59	16
6	21 March 2009	6.40	13

Ant vs. Dec – The Teams

Show	Date	Challenge	Winner	Ant's score	Dec's score	Eliminated/winners
1	14 February 2009	Truck Pull	Ant	1	0	Sinitta
2	21 February 2009	Charity Single	Dec	1	1	Lembit Opik
3	28 February 2009	Duke of Edinburgh Award	Ant	2	1	Edwina Currie
4	7 March 2009	Remembering Donkey's Names	Ant	3	1	Nicky Clarke
5	14 March 2009	Writing a Scene for a Soap	Dec	3	2	Yvette Fielding
6	21 March 2009	Performing Songs from Musicals	Dec	3	3	Liz McClarnon

Celebrity announcers

- 14 February: Paris Hilton
- 21 February: Ricky Gervais
- 28 February: Tom Jones
- 7 March: Al Murray
- 14 March: Paul O'Grady
- 21 March: Zac Efron

=== Series 10 (2013) ===
The tenth series aired during early Spring 2013, having returned from a four-year break, running for seven episodes from 23 February to 6 April, and averaging around 7.82 million viewers. For this series, the show's format removed a number of previous segments, while reviving three segments used in past series - "Ant & Dec Undercover"; "Little Ant & Dec", featuring two new young look-alikes of the presenters; and game "Win the Ads", with a revamped format. This series saw the introduction of two new segments for the show - "I'm a Celebrity... Get Out of My Ear!", and the musical act ""End of the Show"-Show". Sponsorship: Morrisons.

For this series' contest between the presenters, retained when Saturday Night Takeaway returned from its break, the format dropped the use of teams, and incorporated an element of the format from "What's Next", in that the presenters competed against each in games they had no idea about and thus had no rehearsal or practice time to prepare for. The segment was now presented by American singer Ashley Roberts, replacing Gallacher, was aired in only five episodes of the series, and ended with Ant winning the contest for the first time, on a score of 3–2.

Ratings

Episode	Date	Total viewers (millions)	ITV weekly ranking
1	23 February 2013	7.77	10
2	2 March 2013	7.79	12
3	9 March 2013	6.54	13
4	16 March 2013	7.67	10
5	23 March 2013	8.52	8
6	30 March 2013	8.32	8
7	6 April 2013	8.15	8

Ant vs. Dec – "Into The Unknown"

Challenge	Date	Challenge	Winner	Ant's score	Dec's score
1	23 February 2013	Raise the Flag	Ant	1	0
2	9 March 2013	Fairway of Fire	Dec	1	1
3	16 March 2013	Mastermind	Ant	2	1
4	30 March 2013	Catchphrase	Dec	2	2
5	6 April 2013	The Towers of Terror	Ant	3	2

"End of the Show" - Show

Episode	Date	Celebrity Performer(s)
1	23 February 2013	The cast of Singin' in the Rain, featuring Robbie Williams
2	2 March 2013	Royal Philharmonic Orchestra
3	9 March 2013	Spelbound
4	16 March 2013	The cast of Riverdance
5	23 March 2013	Five, Atomic Kitten and Blue, featuring PJ & Duncan
6	30 March 2013	Michael Bublé
7	6 April 2013	The cast of Jersey Boys

Celebrity announcers

- 23 February: David Walliams
- 2 March: Ricky Gervais (Pre-Recorded)
- 9 March: Alan Carr
- 16 March: Sharon Osbourne
- 23 March: Terry Wogan
- 30 March: Lewis Hamilton
- 6 April: Jonathan Ross

=== Series 11 (2014) ===
The eleventh series aired during early Spring 2014, running for seven episodes from 22 February to 5 April, and averaging around 7.61 million viewers. This series saw the introduction of a new game segment entitled "Singalong Live", which featured appearances by Rick Astley, Bonnie Tyler and Right Said Fred. This series' contest between the presenters was won by Dec with a score of 3–2. Sponsorship: Morrisons.

Ratings

Episode	Date	Total viewers (millions)	ITV weekly ranking
1	22 February 2014	7.47	9
2	1 March 2014	7.74	7
3	8 March 2014	8.00	6
4	15 March 2014	8.09	6
5	22 March 2014	7.68	5
6	29 March 2014	7.21	7
7	5 April 2014	7.06	7

Ant vs. Dec – "Into The Unknown - The Sequel"

Challenge Number	Date	Challenge	Winner	Ant's score	Dec's score
1	22 February 2014	Men on a Ledge	Ant	1	0
2	8 March 2014	The Breakout	Dec	1	1
3	29 March 2014	This is Your Life	Draw.	2	2
4	5 April 2014	Decider.	Dec	2	3

"End of the Show" - Show

Episode	Date	Celebrity Performer(s)
1	22 February 2014	Michael Bublé
2	1 March 2014	Diversity
3	8 March 2014	McBusted, Status Quo
4	15 March 2014	The cast of The Commitments
5	22 March 2014	The Top Secret Drum Corps
6	29 March 2014	Attraction and Paul Potts
7	5 April 2014	Robbie Williams

Celebrity announcers

- 22 February: Michael Bublé
- 1 March: Sarah Millican
- 8 March: Keith Lemon
- 15 March: Louis Walsh
- 22 March: The Muppets
- 29 March: Paddy McGuinness
- 5 April: Hugh Bonneville

=== Series 12 (2015) ===
The twelfth series aired during early Spring 2015, running for seven episodes from 21 February to 4 April, and averaging around 7 million viewers. This series featured guest appearances by Alesha Dixon, Robert Rinder, Anne Hegerty and Shaun Wallace, while "Singalong Live" returned and featured appearances by Spandau Ballet, Sister Sledge, S Club 7, and Lou Bega. This series' contest between the presenters was won by Ant with a score of 4–2; unusually the segment featured a competition in which a randomly chosen viewer would win £1,000 if they correctly guessed who would win, but this was dropped after the first challenge, while the fourth challenge allowed the presenters to be given some training to prepare for it. Sponsorship: Morrisons.

Ratings

Episode	Date	Total viewers (millions)	ITV weekly ranking
1	21 February 2015	7.95	6
2	28 February 2015	7.37	7
3	7 March 2015	7.22	7
4	14 March 2015	6.69	9
5	21 March 2015	6.77	8
6	28 March 2015	6.89	6
7	4 April 2015	6.10	12

Ant vs. Dec

Challenge Number	Date	Challenge	Winner	Ant's score	Dec's score
1	21 February 2015	The Turbine	Ant	1	0
2	7 March 2015	The News	Dec	1	1
3	21 March 2015	Big Star Little Star	Ant	2	1
4	28 March 2015	Remembering Japanese Foods	Draw	3	2
5	4 April 2015	The Chase	Ant	4	2

"End of the Show" - Show

Show	Date	Celebrity Performer(s)
1	21 February 2015	The Royal Marines Band (with Ed Sheeran)
2	28 February 2015	Performing Shakespeare with Simon Callow
3	7 March 2015	Britain's Got Talent cast and Dec Saturday night live
4	14 March 2015	Vincent Simone and Flavia Cacace
5	21 March 2015	Barbershop Quartet with Stephen Mulhern, Judge Rinder and Little Ant and Dec.
6	28 March 2015	Professor Green
7	4 April 2015	Mass performance of The Beatles' song "With a Little Help from My Friends"

Celebrity announcers

- 21 February: Dermot O'Leary
- 28 February: McBusted
- 7 March: Rob Brydon
- 14 March: Antony Cotton
- 21 March: Neil Patrick Harris
- 28 March: Clare Balding
- 4 April: Olivia Colman

=== Series 13 (2016) ===
The thirteenth series aired during early Spring 2016, running for seven episodes from 20 February to 2 April, and averaging around 7.78 million viewers; both the fifth and sixth episodes were aired earlier than scheduled to avoid clashing with live coverage of two major sporting events after each respective episode, one of which was a Six Nations Championship match. This series is notable for two elements in its broadcast. The first was that its series finale took place outside the United Kingdom, on the MV Britannia, while it was berthed in Barcelona - tickets for places on the cruise ship were offered during the other episodes as prizes, courtesy of the ship's operator P&O Cruises with tickets. The second was that it featured a live wedding in the sixth episode, between a couple who had written to the production team asking if they could be married on the programme.

The series introduced two new segments. The first, entitled "Best Seats in the House", offered places in the studio audience for the next episode, in a specially marked "VIP" section, with the exception of the first episode were the seats were given to selected members of the audience; for the penultimate episode, the viewers were given tickets for the cruise ship. The second involved a mini-serial "whodunit" comedy drama written by Broadchurch creator Chris Chibnall entitled "Who Shot Simon Cowell?" starring, Ant & Dec starred alongside Simon Cowell, Louis Walsh, Amanda Holden, Alesha Dixon, David Walliams, Piers Morgan, Olly Murs, the late Caroline Flack and Pudsey the Dog as themselves, and Kevin Whately and Emilia Fox as their respective characters from Lewis and Silent Witness. The mini-serial was later condensed into a single episode that was broadcast on 30 December 2017. Amongst the other segments for the show, the game "Win the Ads" received a minor change in its format, reducing the number of prizes that contestants could win in total, while final episode saw the game having the contestant chosen in the final episode was from those on the cruise ship, excluding anyone who won their place via ticket giveaway, and focusing on questions associated with being at sea.

Apart from the mini-serial, this series featured guest appearances by Kym Marsh, Jane Danson, Sally Dynevor, Shayne Ward, Jack P. Shepherd, Leona Lewis, Bring Me the Horizon and Fleur East, along with appearances by YouTubers Alfie Deyes and Marcus Butler. The series also featured opening performances by Bryan Adams, Jess Glynne, Craig David and Katherine Jenkins, while "Singalong Live" featured appearances by Wet Wet Wet, Bryan Adams, Anastacia, and Peter Andre. For this series' contest between the presenters, the segment was hosted by Stephen Mulhern, replacing Roberts who took to hosting the segment "Best Seats", and was won by Dec with a score of 4–1. Sponsorship: Suzuki.

Ratings

Episode	Date	Total viewers (millions)	ITV weekly ranking
1	20 February 2016	8.78	1
2	27 February 2016	8.55	1
3	5 March 2016	7.78	5
4	12 March 2016	7.58	4
5	19 March 2016	7.48	4
6	26 March 2016	6.76	12
7	2 April 2016	7.55	8

Ant vs. Dec

Challenge number	Date	Challenge	Winner	Ant's score	Dec's score
1	20 February 2016	Life-Size Pac-Man	Dec	0	1
2	5 March 2016	Duet Dual "When You're Gone" with Melanie C, "Life Is a Rollercoaster" with Ronan Keating, "Don't Go Breaking My Heart" with Kiki Dee	Dec	0	2
3	19 March 2016	All Star Fame-ily Fortunes	Ant	1	2
4	26 March 2016	Mini-Motorbike Race	Dec	1	3
5	2 April 2016	The Cube	Dec	1	4

Who Shot Simon Cowell?

Episode	Date	Runtime	Show
1	27 February 2016	5 mins 3 secs	2
2	5 March 2016	5 mins 34 secs	3
3	19 March 2016	6 mins 12 secs	5
4	26 March 2016	5 mins 28 secs	6
5	2 April 2016	6 mins 32 secs	7

"End of the Show" - Show

Show	Date	Celebrity Performer(s)	Performance
1	20 February 2016	The Vamps	Medley of "Last Night", "Wake Up" and "Oh Cecilia (Breaking My Heart)"
2	27 February 2016	Little Mix	Country version of "Black Magic"
3	5 March 2016	Jess Glynne	"Hold My Hand"
4	12 March 2016	Craig David	Mashup of "When the Bassline Drops" and "Nothing Like This"
5	19 March 2016	The casts of Mamma Mia! and Motown: The Musical	Showdown with Ant representing Mamma Mia! and Dec representing Motown: The Musical.
6	26 March 2016	The cast of Billy Elliot feat. Little Ant & Dec	Ballet dance routine ("The Stars Look Down", "Shine" and "Expressing Yourself")
7	2 April 2016	Ant & Dec feat. Katherine Jenkins, Little Ant & Dec, James Nesbitt, Stephen Mulhern, Peter Andre, Ashley Roberts, Stacey Solomon, Jonathan Wilkes, Marcus Butler, Alfie Deyes and Aquabatix	All singing, all dancing routine ("We're All in the Same Boat, Brother")

Celebrity announcers

- 20 February: Michael Sheen
- 27 February: Lee Mack
- 5 March: Kate Hudson
- 12 March: David Tennant
- 19 March: Hugh Jackman
- 26 March: Mark Hamill
- 2 April: James Nesbitt

=== Series 14 (2017) ===
The fourteenth series was aired during early Spring 2017, running for seven episodes from 25 February to 8 April, and averaging around 8.02 million viewers; the fourth episode (18 March) was broadcast later than scheduled to avoid clashing with live coverage of a Six Nations Championship match, and ran for just 60 minutes as opposed to the usual 90 minutes. Like the previous series, the final episode took place outside of the United Kingdom, being broadcast live from Walt Disney World in Orlando, Florida, with tickets for places in that episode's audience being offered throughout the series. This series saw the introduction of two short-lived segments - "Make 'Em Laugh" and "In For A Penny" - while the segment "Best Seat in the House" was presented by Scarlett Moffatt, after Roberts opted to not return to the show for a new series, and the stars of "Little Ant & Dec" now featured across the show and online, rather than in a dedicated segment. The game segment "Win the Ads" was also modified in this series, with it now featuring a viewer competition, in which those taking part competed against each other answered the same questions for a chance to win £1,000; in the fourth and sixth episode, technical difficulties prevented the competition from being used.

Like the previous series, a new mini-serial comedy drama was shown during this series broadcast, entitled "The Missing Crown Jewels", the boys starred in it alongside, Emilia Fox, Joanna Lumley, Cat Deeley, Aled Jones, Alan Titchmarsh, Gareth Malone, Martin Lewis, Clare Balding, Carol Vorderman, Shirley Bassey, Ian "H" Watkins, Alan Shearer, Jessica Ennis-Hill, and Michael Sheen, and which was later condensed into a single episode on 23 December 2017. Alfie Deyes & Marcus Butler didn't return after 1 series. This series also saw the introduction on an online game called "Ant & Dec vs. YouTubers", in which the presenters took on a pair of YouTubers on Wednesday during the series' broadcast, with filmed clips placed on the show's official YouTube channel.

Apart from the mini-serial, this series featured opening performances in a number of episodes by Robbie Williams, Kaiser Chiefs, Take That, Louisa Johnson, with the exception of the final episode in which the presenters performed a special rendition of the song Be Our Guest. For "Singalong Live", it featured performances by Steps, Louisa Johnson, CeeLo Green, and was unique for a number of factors: one of the contestants who took part was Freddie Flintoff, the episode's celebrity announcer, who was tasked with playing along in the game, with his success winning everyone in the studio audience tickets to the Steps' comeback tour; for the sixth episode, the song used was "Let It Go", as a prize of a "Place on the Plane" for the series finale at Walt Disney World the following week was on offer in addition to the usual £500. This series' contest between the presenter was won by Ant with a score of 3–1. Sponsorship: Suzuki.

Ratings

Episode	Date	Total viewers (millions)	ITV weekly ranking
1	25 February 2017	8.75	1
2	4 March 2017	8.29	2
3	11 March 2017	7.98	2
4	18 March 2017	8.68	3
5	25 March 2017	7.72	4
6	1 April 2017	7.38	7
7	8 April 2017	7.35	6

Ant vs. Dec: Through Time

Challenge number	Date	Challenge	Theme	Winner	Ant's score	Dec's score
1	25 February 2017	The Floor is Lava / parkour challenge	Prehistoric times	Ant	1	0
2	4 March 2017	Mummies Knows Best / quiz	Egyptian	Ant	2	0
3	25 March 2017	Archery Challenge	Medieval	Dec	2	1
4	8 April 2017	A journey through time	1939, 1953, Future	Ant won 1 challenge Dec won 2 challenges	3	3
5	8 April 2017	The big bang / history quiz	the big bang	Ant	4	3

"End of the Show" - Show

Episode	Date	Celebrity Performer	Performance
1	25 February 2017	Jennifer Hudson feat. Scarlett Moffatt, Ant & Dec, Little Ant & Dec, Jamie Oliver, Michelle Keegan and Stephen Mulhern	"Spotlight"
2	4 March 2017	Ant & Dec feat. Robbie Williams, Stephen Mulhern, Mrs Brown and the Philharmonic Orchestra	Bell ringing to the "Can Can Theme", with cancan dancers
3	11 March 2017	Kaiser Chiefs feat. Ant and Dec and Little Ant & Dec	A performance of "I Predict a Riot" feat. comical hijinks from Ant & Dec
4	18 March 2017	Ant and Dec feat. Little Ant & Dec, Scarlett Moffatt, Stephen Mulhern and ensemble	Ant and Dec: The Musical
5	25 March 2017	Take That with Ant and Dec feat. Stephen Mulhern, Scarlett Moffatt, Little Ant & Dec and Olly Murs via Skype	Take That medley
6	1 April 2017	The SNT Gospel Choir feat. Ant and Dec, Little Ant & Dec, Scarlett Moffatt, Dermot O'Leary, Louisa Johnson and Alexander Armstrong	Subtle "Thank You" Song
7	8 April 2017	Ant and Dec feat. Little Ant and Dec, Stephen Mulhern, Scarlett Moffatt, and a selection of Walt Disney World characters	"Supercalifragilisticexpialidocious"

Celebrity announcers

- 25 February: Michelle Keegan
- 4 March: Brendan O'Carroll (as Mrs. Brown)
- 11 March: Andrew “Freddie” Flintoff
- 18 March: Hugh Bonneville
- 25 March: Blake Harrison
- 1 April: Alexander Armstrong
- 8 April: Christina Ricci

=== Series 15 (2018) ===
The fifteenth series was aired in early Spring 2018, running for a short total of six episodes from 24 February to 7 April, and averaging around 8.43 million viewers. Like the previous series, the series finale took place outside of the UK at Universal Orlando Resort with tickets for places in this episode offered through the series, while it was the last series to be broadcast live from London Studios before its closure for redevelopment later in the year. This series saw "Little Ant & Dec" discontinued, owing to the production team deciding that the young actors for this segment had outgrown their roles and thus should be allowed to focus on their education, while "Ant & Dec Undercover" was restricted to just one episode, owing to the massive and complex amount of preparation done to film the segment. This series aired its 100th episode, which celebrated this milestone by featuring highlights from the last 99 episodes of Saturday Night Takeaway, along with a one-off revival of the segment "Home-Run", and a special edition of "Win the Ads", hosted by Emma Willis, in which the presenters tackled the game themselves on behalf of a studio audience member randomly chosen before the episode's broadcast.

As like the previous series, it features a mini-serial comedy drama entitled "Saturday Knight Takeaway", to be aired during the series' broadcast. The mini-serial features a large cast of celebrities: Ant & Dec, Holly Willoughby, Phillip Schofield, David Walliams, Katie Price, Emilia Fox, Joanna Lumley, Aled Jones, Alan Titchmarsh, Gareth Malone, Martin Lewis, Clare Balding, Carol Vorderman, Shirley Bassey, Ian "H" Watkins, Alan Shearer, Jessica Ennis-Hill, Michael Sheen and Noel Edmonds. Apart from the mini-serial, the series featured opening performances from Kylie Minogue, George Ezra, Paloma Faith, as well as a special rendition of Everybody Needs Somebody to Love for the series finale. For "Singalong Live", it featured performances by Sophie Ellis-Bextor, The Script, and The Rembrandts.

This series is notable for being affected greatly by the absence of Anthony McPartlin following the fourth episode, after he was involved in a traffic accident on 18 March 2018, connected to drink-driving, which led to him suspending further presenting duties the following day for the rest of the series and other programmes. As a direct result, it led to an episode that was planned for the 24 March 2018 to be cancelled by ITV, and the discontinuation of "Ant vs. Dec" for the rest of the series after two challenges. However, its most significant impact, was that it led to Declan Donnelly hosting the remaining two episodes by himself, the first time he had presented a programme in 30 years without McPartlin, with his co-presenters Stephen Mulhern and Scarlett Moffatt receiving expanded roles in these episodes. Although absent, McPartlin appeared in these episodes but solely within the pre-recorded editions of the mini-serial "Saturday Knight Takeaway". The decision to continue the series after the incident had occurred was primarily down to the presenters and the production team choosing not to cancel tickets made out to people who had secured a place within the audience for the series finale in Florida. Sponsorship: Suzuki.

Ratings

Episode	Date	Total Viewers (millions)	ITV weekly ranking
1	24 February 2018	9.05	1
2	3 March 2018	8.93	1
3	10 March 2018	7.98	4
4	17 March 2018	8.51	1
5	31 March 2018	9.02	1
6	7 April 2018	8.12	7

Saturday Knight Takeaway

Episode	Date	Runtime	Show
1	3 March 2018	5 mins 32 secs	2
2	10 March 2018	5 mins 57 secs	3
3	17 March 2018	6 mins 20 secs	4
4	31 March 2018	6 mins 7 secs	5
5	7 April 2018	8 mins 15 secs	6

Ant vs Dec

Challenge number	Date	Challenge	Winner	Ant's score	Dec's score
1	24 February 2018	Monster Trucks*	Ant	1	0
2	3 March 2018	The 100th Episode Saturday Night Takeaway Trivia Quiz	Dec	1	1

*Commentated by Monster Jam commentator Jody Donnelly.

Ant & Dec Undercover

Show	Date	Celebrity	Location
1	24 February 2018	Amanda Holden	QVC

I'm a Celebrity...Get Out of Me Ear!

Show	Date	Celebrity(s)	Location
4	17 March 2018	Jordan Banjo; Ashley Banjo	The Gym

"End of the Show" - Show

Show	Date	Celebrity	Performance
1	24 February 2018	Kylie Minogue feat. Ant & Dec, Stephen Mulhern, Scarlett Moffatt, Amanda Holden and Olly Murs	Medley of songs from Kylie's 30-year career.
2	3 March 2018	Alfie Boe and Michael Ball, with Ruthie Henshall, Paul Potts, Ricky Wilson, Emma Willis, Sophie Ellis-Bextor and Riverdance feat. Ant & Dec	'Bring Me Sunshine'
3	10 March 2018	Cast of School Of Rock, Alexandra Burke, and Joe McElderry, feat. Ant & Dec, James Corden and Phillip Schofield	70th Birthday West End Musical Tribute to Andrew Lloyd Webber ft. songs from School of Rock, Cats, The Phantom of the Opera and Joseph and the Amazing Technicolor Dreamcoat.
4	17 March 2018	George Ezra	'Cassy O''
5	31 March 2018	Paloma Faith feat. Declan Donnelly, Stephen Mulhern, and Scarlett Moffatt	'Upside Down'
6	7 April 2018	Jason Derulo feat. Declan Donnelly, Stephen Mulhern, Scarlett Moffatt, Mark Wright, Craig David, and a selection of Universal Orlando Resort characters	"Colors/"Conga"

Star guest announcers

- 24 February: Olly Murs
- 3 March: Cuba Gooding Jr.
- 10 March: James Corden
- 17 March: Emma Bunton
- 31 March: Stephen Merchant
- 7 April: Denise Richards

=== Series 16 (2020) ===
The sixteenth series of Saturday Night Takeaway returned on 22 February 2020 on ITV and was the first series to see the return of Anthony McPartlin hosting alongside Declan Donnelly following his absence from the previous series' last two episodes in which Donnelly hosted solely. It was also the first to be broadcast from their new home at Television Centre, London following the closure of The London Studios in 2018. Stephen Mulhern returned to host the Ant vs. Dec segment, which for this series had a "global" theme to all of the challenges. However, Scarlett Moffatt did not return to the show as she left to focus on other TV projects. Andi Peters and Fleur East joined this series to present the competition and part of the Place on the Plane giveaway, respectively.

This series saw a new mini-serial entitled Men in Brown starring Ant & Dec still serving as undercover agents for The Honoured and tasked with saving the world from an alien invasion. Phillip Schofield, Holly Willoughby, Emily Atack, Amanda Holden, Amber Gill, Simon Cowell, Richard Ayoade, Paul Hollywood (as The Host), Paddy McGuinness, and Hugh Bonneville (replacing Joanna Lumley as the head of The Honoured) guest starred in the mini-serial.

Another new segment called Don't Feed the Pandas, involved Ant & Dec dressing up in realistic prosthetic panda costumes in an attempt to fool school kids at London Zoo. Other features returning from the previous series include I'm a Celebrity...Get Out of Me Ear!, Singalong Live and Undercover. Win the Ads also returned with a minor tweak in its format, the viewers competition used in the previous two series was discontinued and instead, one of the 16 prizes on the boýard would be won not just by the contestant but for the entire studio audience (studio crew in the fifth episode) as well.

The first I'm a Celebrity...Get Out of Me Ear! of the series was with American actor Mark Wahlberg at his London restaurant where he pranked members of the public with the help of Ant & Dec talking into an ear piece. The first show marked the return of Ashley Roberts with The Pussycat Dolls to the show she left after Series 13 in 2016. The second I'm a Celebrity...Get Out of Me Ear! was with British Boxer and "Heavyweight Champion of the World" Anthony Joshua at his local boxing club where pranked three members of the public by saying that they were going to be his personal chief with the help of Ant & Dec talking into an ear piece. The third I'm a Celebrity...Get Out of Me Ear! was with British singer-songwriter and DJ Craig David.

Andi Peters presented the competition segment, which in the first episode was live from Bermuda, Nuneaton, the second episode was live from New York in Newcastle and the fourth episode was live from Melbourne, Derbyshire. He was in the studio for episode five. In the second episode, Fleur East gave some tickets for a Place on the Plane to a winning family in Bristol and in the fourth episode Fleur East visited Kingston upon Hull where the family who guessed the restaurant correctly (which was Papas Fish and Chips shop in Kingston upon Hull) won another Place on the Plane.

The Place on the Plane giveaway was again announced on the first show of the series, with the series finale location revealed as Walt Disney World in Orlando, Florida for the second time (having previously hosted the series finale in Series 14). It was also confirmed it would be the largest ever giveaway by a British television programme with 300 guests being invited to be the audience for the show. This was done in partnership with Virgin Atlantic. However, on 13 March, it was announced that due to the COVID-19 pandemic that the finale would be cancelled and the ticket holders instead enjoyed a 5-star hotel stay at the park at a later date.

Following viewer complaints about the 14 March episode still having a live audience despite the pandemic and the Prime Minister Boris Johnson advising against all mass gatherings in an effort to slow down the spread, ITV confirmed on 17 March that the remaining episodes of the series would be produced without a live audience, with a reduced production crew, and a shorter 1-hour running time for the last two episodes. It was later revealed on Twitter that the last two episodes would be hosted live from Ant & Dec's living rooms, in the form of a video call with each other, and contain pre-recorded content, shortly after the UK was put into lockdown. Sponsorship: Deliveroo

Ratings

Episode	Date	Total viewers (millions)	ITV weekly ranking
1	22 February 2020	8.69	1
2	29 February 2020	7.42	1
3	7 March 2020	7.72	1
4	14 March 2020	8.24	1
5	21 March 2020	10.67	1
6	28 March 2020	9.34	1
7	4 April 2020	7.68	2

Opening Performance

Show	Date	Celebrity	Performance
2	29 February 2020	Anne-Marie	"Birthday"
3	7 March 2020	Jax Jones & Ella Henderson	"This Is Real"

Men in Brown

Episode	Date	Runtime	Show
1	29 February 2020	7 mins 40 secs	2
2	7 March 2020	6 mins 34 secs	3
3	14 March 2020	6 mins 40 secs	4
4	21 March 2020	5 mins 44 secs	5
5	28 March 2020	6 mins 16 secs	6

Ant vs Dec Goes Global

Challenge number	Date	Challenge	Country	Winner	Ant's score	Dec's score
1	22 February 2020	Axe Throwing*	Norway	Dec	0	1
2	7 March 2020	Virtual Reality	America	Dec	0	2
3	21 March 2020	In for a Penny	United Kingdom	Dec	2	6

*Commentated by Clive Tyldesley.

Ant & Dec Undercover

Show	Date	Celebrity	Location
5	21 March 2020	Bradley Walsh	The Chase
6	28 March 2020	Gordon Ramsay	MasterChef
7	4 April 2020	James Corden	The Late Late Show

*The Undercover was under the title of "Bradley Walsh 2: The Chase Is On"

*Re-screening of Gordon Ramsay's Undercover prank from 2014

*Re-screening of James Corden's Undercover prank from 2016.

Singalong Live

Show	Date	Celebrity	Song
4	14 March 2020	Ronan Keating	"Life is a Rollercoaster"

I'm a Celebrity...Get Out of Me Ear!

Show	Date	Celebrity	Location
1	22 February 2020	Mark Wahlberg	Wahlburgers
2	29 February 2020	Anthony Joshua	Joshua's local boxing club
3	7 March 2020	Craig David	Craig David's House
4	28 March 2020	Richard Madeley	Richard Madeley's House
5	4 April 2020	Dermot O'Leary	Tesco

*Re-screening of Richard Madeley's Get Out of Me Ear! prank from 2015

*Re-screening of Dermot O'Leary's Get Out of Me Ear! prank from 2017

"End of the Show" - Show

Show	Date	Celebrity	Performance
1	22 February 2020	Pussycat Dolls feat. Nicole Scherzinger, Carmit Bachar, Ashley Roberts, Jessica Sutta, Kimberly Wyatt & Ant & Dec	A medley of their hits including "Buttons", "Don't Cha" and "React", with Ant & Dec trying to "censor" their performance.
2	29 February 2020	Anne-Marie feat. Ant & Dec	"Ciao Adios" with Ant & Dec performing Karate with special effects cards.
3	7 March 2020	Twist & Pulse feat. Ant & Dec	Dance Battle with Ant & Dec
4	14 March 2020	JLS feat. Aston Merrygold, Oritsé Williams, Marvin Humes, JB Gill, Ant & Dec, Fleur East, Joanna Lumley & Andi Peters	The group were riding a train on the Underground for most of the show and were running late as a result. They barely made it in time for the end of the show so Ant & Dec raced out of the studio to meet them as they began their performance and made their way inside performing their songs "Beat Again", "She Makes Me Wanna" & "Everybody in Love".
5	21 March 2020	Olly Murs feat. Ant & Dec, Joel Dommett, Stephen Mulhern, Bradley Walsh and Andi Peters	Olly performs "Dance With Me Tonight" onstage whilst videos showing a compilation of pre recorded videos of the public dancing to the song.
6	28 March 2020	Kylie Minogue feat. Ant & Dec, Stephen Mulhern, Scarlett Moffatt, Amanda Holden and Olly Murs	Re-screening of Kylie Minogue's performance on the show at the start of Series 15. Medley of songs from Kylie's 30-year career.
7	4 April 2020	Five, Atomic Kitten and Blue, featuring PJ & Duncan	Re-screening of the performances on the show in Series 10.

Star Guest Announcers:

- 22 February: Camila Cabello
- 29 February: Rob Brydon
- 7 March: Greg James
- 14 March: Joanna Lumley
- 21 March: Joel Dommett
- 28 March: Harry Luck (virtual)
- 4 April: Dave Grohl (rescreening)

=== Series 17 (2021) ===
The seventeenth series of Saturday Night Takeaway returned on 20 February 2021. For the first time in the show's history, due to COVID-19 regime, a virtual audience wall was used and included interactive features such as live polling. I'm a Celebrity...Get Out of Me Ear! and Ant v Dec were amongst the series' returning features 1, alongside a new mini-series entitled 'Double Trouble' and the weekly 'Takeaway Rainbow,' during which viewers were encouraged to look out of their window to find a rainbow light display projected in one area of the country and to message the show on if they could see the rainbow. A random winner living in the area where the rainbow was that week would then receive Takeaway Getaway tickets by Fleur East. Locations included: Aintree, Kent, Chepstow, Portsmouth & Peterborough.

A new segment for this series was “On Air Dares” in where Stephen Mulhern set various challenges to the presenters of ITV Daytime programmes: Good Morning Britain, Lorraine, This Morning & Loose Women. Challenges presented by Stephen in the studio via a card involved saying or doing a particular task live on TV e.g. pretending to have a cramp, saying words like “totes emosh”, pretending to see a spider in the studio etc. This Morning were declared winners since they completed the most dares.

Also due to the COVID-19 regime the series finale will be live at the Television Centre, London and the main 'Happiest Minute' and series giveaway was changed to reflect this. Now called the 'Takeaway Getaway,' winners are given the opportunity to take an all-inclusive holiday anytime up to April 2023 courtesy of TUI. Sponsorship: National Lottery

Ratings

Episode	Date	Total viewers (millions)	ITV weekly ranking
1	20 February 2021	8.51	1
2	27 February 2021	8.01	1
3	6 March 2021	7.44	3
4	13 March 2021	7.30	3
5	20 March 2021	7.41	2
6	27 March 2021	7.18	2
7	3 April 2021	6.00	4

Opening Performance

Show	Date	Celebrity	Performance
1	20 February 2021	Gary Barlow and Beverley Knight	"Enough is Enough"
2	27 February 2021	Rag'n'Bone Man and Pink	“All You Ever Wanted”
3	6 March 2021	Tom Jones	“No Hole In My Head”
7	3 April 2021	Joel Corry, Raye & David Guetta	"Bed"

Double Trouble

Episode	Date	Runtime	Show
1	27 February 2021	5 mins 43 secs	2
2	6 March 2021	6 mins 8 secs	3
3	13 March 2021	4 mins 29 secs	4
4	27 March 2021	5 mins 53 secs	6
5	3 April 2021	6 mins 10 secs	7

Ant vs Dec: Go for Gold

Challenge number	Date	Challenge	Winner	Ant's score	Dec's score
1	20 February 2021	Footy Putty* / Mini Golf game with Footballs.	Ant	1	0
2	6 March 2021	’Fencing’ Hide & Seek* / Trying to hit the button at the front without getting spotted.	Dec	1	1
2	20 March 2021	Quasketball / Basketball Quiz	Dec	1	2
3	3 April 2021	The Superbowls* / Indoor Bowls challenge	Ant	7	3

*Commentated by Clive Tyldesley.

Singalong Live

Show	Singer(s)	Song
2	Brian Conley, Bonnie Langford, Chelsea Halfpenny, Caroline Sheen, Natalie McQueen and the West End cast of 9 to 5	9 to 5
4	Kaiser Chiefs	Ruby
6	Erasure	A Little Respect

Ant & Dec Undercover

Show	Date	Description	Location
2	27 February 2021	The second ‘Don't Feed The Pandas’ segment with Ant & Dec dressed as realistic pandas, encouraging children to help them escape	Hamleys, London
4	13 March 2021	Members of the public are served by Ant & Dec at the ‘Takeaway Drive-Thru’	Costa Coffee drive-thru
5	20 March 2021	Undercover hit on Cat Deeley	Studio in London

I'm a Celebrity...Get Out of Me Ear!

Show	Date	Celebrity	Description
1	20 February 2021	Harry Redknapp & Jamie Redknapp	Interviews for new bar staff
3	6 March 2021	Davina McCall	Recording a new fitness show
7	3 April 2021	Mo Farah	Interviews for a nanny

"End of the Show" - Show

Show	Date	Celebrity	Performance
1	20 February 2021	Gary Barlow feat Ant & Dec, Jamie Redknapp, Harry Redknapp, Stephen Mulhern and The London Vegetable Orchestra	Barlow performs his single 'Incredible' with some vegetable-themed altered lyrics, supported by a vegetable-playing orchestra
2	27 February 2021	Rag'n'Bone Man feat. Ant & Dec	Rag'n'Bone Man performs 'Giant' with Ant and Dec trying to make themselves taller in the background.
3	6 March 2021	Tom Jones feat. Ant & Dec and Tom and Jerry from Tom & Jerry (2021 film)	Jones performs Great Balls of Fire whilst Ant & Dec join him to chase Tom & Jerry around the studios before they all join together to dance
4	13 March 2021	Nathan Evans feat. Ant & Dec	Evans performs an edited version of his viral hit "Wellerman" alongside Ant & Dec and a number of studio and virtual guests
5	20 March 2021	Ant & Dec with Cat Deeley	Revival episode of SMTV Live sitcom feature ‘Chums’ starring Sting, Veronica Green, Brian McFadden, Lynn Parsons, Joe Lycett, Emily Atack, Steps, Simon Pegg, Michelle Visage, Eamonn Holmes, Ruth Langsford, Fleur East, Stephen Mulhern, Janice Long & Romesh Ranganathan as voiceover.
6	27 March 2021	McFly feat. Ant & Dec & Stephen Mulhern	McFly perform a virtual performance of “Happiness” before entering the studio whilst Stephen Mulhern traps Ant & Dec in the virtual screen.
7	3 April 2021	Jon Courtenay feat. Ant & Dec	Original song sang by Courtenay and Ant & Dec looking back at highlights across the series featuring memorable guests & moments in the studio and on screen.

Star Guest Announcers:

- 20 February: Olly Alexander
- 27 February: Gordon Ramsay
- 6 March: Rob Delaney
- 13 March: Michelle Visage
- 20 March: Romesh Ranganathan
- 27 March: Alesha Dixon
- 3 April: Mo Gilligan

=== Series 18 (2022) ===
On 9 February 2022, ITV revealed on their Twitter page that the eighteenth series of Saturday Night Takeaway will be airing for its usual seven-week run from 19 February 2022 to 9 April 2022. Series 18 saw the return of a full live studio audience, this is the first time since S16E4 which was broadcast on 14 March 2020 that the show had a live audience, as well as a brand new mini-series called Polter Guys. Jordan North joined this series appearing during the "Happiest Minute Of The Week" segment surprising someone live with a "Gift on the Shift" in where they win a "Takeaway Getaway" Sponsorship: National Lottery

New segments for this series included “Ring My Bell”, “Kiddi-oke”, “Level Up” and a revamp to last years Takeaway Rainbow called “Chase The Rainbow”. "Sofa Watch" also made its first return since series 15.

Returning segments from last series included “Saturday Night at the Movies” and “On-Air Dares”.

Ratings

Episode	Date	Total viewers (millions)	ITV weekly ranking
1	19 February 2022	7.46	2
2	26 February 2022	6.71	2
3	5 March 2022	6.41	1
4	12 March 2022	5.68	3
5	26 March 2022	5.32	3
6	2 April 2022	5.34	3
7	9 April 2022	4.99	4

Polter Guys

Episode	Show	Date	Title	Duration
1	2	26 February 2022	Deal with the Devil	6:37
2	3	5 March 2022	Ghoul School	5:24
3	4	12 March 2022	Possession Party	6:08
4	6	2 April 2022	Burglary at Beelzebub's	5:21
5	7	9 April 2022	Hell Hatch No Fury	5:48

Ant vs Dec vs...

Challenge number	Date	Challenge (Vs...)	Winner	Ant's score	Dec's score
1	19 February 2022	The Audience / Quiz and catching ball game featuring the Audience	Ant	1	0
2	26 March 2022	The Dark / Touching the player's light on the back in the dark	Dec	1	1
3	9 April 2022	Power Tools / Race featuring Power tools	Dec	1	2

Ant and Dec Undercover

Show	Date	Description	Location
1	19 February 2022	Undercover hit on Jeremy Clarkson	Diddly Squat Farm
2	26 February 2022	Members of the public take on the “Takeaway Security System”	The O2
5	26 March 2022	Grandchildren are pranked by their nans	The Dixon hotel's restaurant

I'm A Celebrity Get Out Of Me Ear...

Show	Date	Celebrity	Description
3	5 March 2022	Craig Revel Horwood	Finding a wedding planner
7	9 April 2022	Oti Mabuse	Finding a driver

Singalong Live

Show	Date	Singer(s)	Song
3	5 March 2022	The Darkness	I Believe In A Thing Called Love
6	2 April 2022	Culture Club	Karma Chameleon

"End of the Show" - Show

Show	Date	Celebrity	Performance
1	19 February 2022	Ant & Dec, The Vivienne, Lawrence Chaney and Krystal Versace	Ant & Dec perform their new single "We Werk Together" alongside the three winners of RuPaul's Drag Race UK
2	26 February 2022	The West End Cast of Mary Poppins The Musical featuring Ant & Dec	Ant & Dec perform a rendition of "Step in Time" alongside the cast of Mary Poppins the Musical
3	5 March 2022	Malevo	Argentinian dance troupe Malevo make their UK TV debut alongside Ant & Dec.
4	12 March 2022	Sam Fender	Fender performs "Seventeen Going Under" whilst Ant & Dec race to the middle of the series party.
5	26 March 2022	Michael Bublé	Bublé performs while Ant & Dec try to conduct.
6	2 April 2022	George Ezra	Performance of Anyone for You (Tiger Lily) alongside Ant & Dec with cut-out signs & props.
7	9 April 2022	Ant & Dec, Andi Peters, Fleur East, Stephen Mulhern and Oti Mabuse	Song performed in the tune of the Can-can looking back on memorable moments throughout the series featuring viewers tweets and messages.

Star Guest Announcers:

- 19 February: RuPaul
- 26 February: Adam Lambert
- 5 March: Paloma Faith
- 12 March: Richard E. Grant
- 26 March: Anna Maxwell Martin
- 2 April: Steve Coogan (acting as Alan Partridge)
- 9 April: Lee Mack

=== Series 19 (2023) ===
The nineteenth series aired between 25 February 2023 and 8 April 2023 for its usual 7-episode run. It was announced that the series finale would be taking place at Universal Orlando Resort for the first time since 2018, and it is also the first finale abroad since before the COVID-19 pandemic, after cancelling going to Walt Disney World Resort in 2020. It is also Anthony McPartlin's first Saturday Night Takeaway trip abroad since Walt Disney World in 2017, as he had to miss out on the last trip abroad to Universal Orlando Resort in 2018 due to his rehabilitation. A 1 hour documentary entitled "Ant & Dec's Saturday Night Takeaway: Behind the Screens" is being filmed during the series. Jordan North returned to the show with a new feature named “The Takeaway Truck” alongside Fleur East who stars in “Gift On A Shift” during the “Happiest Minute” & a new game “Who You Gonna Call?” and Andi Peters promoting a competition in various locations each week, along with a brand new mini-series called "Murder at Bigwig Manor". Sponsorship: Rightmove.

Episode	Date	Total viewers (millions)	ITV weekly ranking
1	25 February 2023	6.37	1
2	4 March 2023	5.48	2
3	11 March 2023	5.42	2
4	18 March 2023	5.22	3
5	25 March 2023	5.05	4
6	1 April 2023	5.57	2
7	8 April 2023	5.12	4

Murder At Bigwig Manor

Episode	Show	Date	Duration
1	2	4 March 2023	5:55
2	3	11 March 2023	5:32
3	4	18 March 2023	5:13
4	6	1 April 2023	6:48
5	7	8 April 2023	6:27

Ant vs Dec vs...

Challenge number	Date	Challenge (Vs...)		Winner	Ant's score	Dec's score
1	25 February 2023	Balloons / balloon race outside television Centre		Ant	1	0
2	11 March 2023	Doors / escaping through a series of doors and trying to escape		Dec	1	1
3	25 March 2023	Ice / Ice quiz where if you can't guess how many of something you can name you go down, get 3 wrong and you go in an ice bath.		Dec	1	2
4	8 April 2023	Movies	First Challenge / spot the difference while on rollercoaster	Ant	2	2
5	8 April 2023	Movies	Second Challenge / Trying to find Universal characters in 3 minutes	Draw	3	3
6	8 April 2023	Movies	Third Challenge / Harry potter read my lips challenge while on a rollercoaster	Draw	4	4
7	8 April 2023	Movies	Fourth Challenge / Complete the missing American word challenge and if you lose you get pied in the face	Dec	4	5

Ant & Dec Undercover

Show	Date	Description	Location
1	25 February 2023	Undercover hit on Alison Hammond	The Speech House Hotel
6	1 April 2023	Undercover hit on Rylan	Dukes Island Studios

I'm A Celebrity Get Out Of Me Ear...

Show	Date	Celebrity	Description
3	11 March 2023	Claudia Winkleman	Shopping in IKEA
4	18 March 2023	Joe Wicks	Looking for a new handyman

Singalong Live

Show	Date	Singer(s)	Song
4	18 March 2023	Toploader	Dancing in the Moonlight
7	8 April 2023	Wheatus	Teenage Dirtbag

"End of the Show" - Show

Show	Date	Celebrity	Performance
1	25 February 2023	Tom Grennan	Dressing-room performance of "Remind Me" with dancers and Ant & Dec, inspired by the "Virtual Insanity" music video.
2	4 March 2023	Mimi Webb	Performance of "Red Flags" with Ant & Dec interacting with lasers.
3	11 March 2023	The West End Cast of Frozen	Performance of “Let It Go” with Ant & Dec featuring Stephen Mulhern
4	18 March 2023	Jake Shears	Performance of "Too Much Music" with Ant & Dec featuring Joe Wicks & Fleur East
5	25 March 2023	Diversity	Dancing in a silent movie style with Ant & Dec accompanying them.
6	1 April 2023	Busted	Medley of "Crashed the Wedding", "Air Hostess" & "Year 3000" throughout the studio as Ant & Dec pack up for Florida, with appearances from Andi Peters, Stephen Mulhern, Jordan North, Fleur East, Rylan, Rob Beckett & various characters from Universal Pictures/DreamWorks Animation franchises along with SpongeBob SquarePants.
7	8 April 2023	Ant & Dec, Jordan North, Fleur East, Andi Peters, Stephen Mulhern, Nicole Sherzinger and the University of Central Florida Marching Knights.	Marching band performance through the Universal Studios Florida park, with Dancing in the Street as a backing track.

Star Guest Announcers:

- 25 February: David Tennant
- 4 March: Big Zuu
- 11 March: Daisy May Cooper
- 18 March: Toni Collette
- 25 March: Jill Scott
- 1 April: Rob Beckett
- 8 April: Nicole Scherzinger

=== Series 20 (2024) ===
It was revealed by ITV that Saturday Night Takeaway would return for a twentieth and final series; in 2024, which started airing on February 24, 2024. The series was billed as a "Grand Celebration" of the last twenty series with returning features such as Win The Ads and a return, of what would be the third incarnation of Little Ant & Dec. Applications for which opened in September 2023.

Ant & Dec also announced that the series will go on an indefinite hiatus, taking a break from the programme after the series. The duo will still be presenting their other shows such as Limitless Win, Britain's Got Talent and I'm a Celebrity...Get Me Out of Here!. The last episode was a 2 hour special including Girls Aloud as star guest announcers, the final challenge of Ant vs Dec, the final Get Out of Me Ear! at a restaurant with Ant & Dec, 3 Singalongs, the biggest prizes in Win the Ads and the end of the show show to end all show shows featuring people from home. Sponsorship: The National Lottery.

Episode	Date	Total viewers (millions)	ITV weekly ranking
1	24 February 2024	6.54	2
2	2 March 2024	4.85	2
3	9 March 2024	4.89	2
4	23 March 2024	4.73	3
5	30 March 2024	4.34	4
6	6 April 2024	4.80	2
7	13 April 2024	5.42	2

Ant vs Dec vs...

Show	Date	Challenge (Vs…)	Winner	Ant's score	Dec's score
1	24 February 2024	Most Evil Plan Ever / Climbing challenge with Ant & Dec climbing up elevated structures outside Television Centre	Ant	1	0
3	9 March 2024	Lies / Truth or Lie challenge whilst watching comic scenarios starring various celebrities including Anne Hegerty, Shaun Wallace, Mr. Motivator, Jedward, Shrek from Universal Orlando Resort, Martin Roberts and Prue Leith	Dec	1	1
5	30 March 2024	In for a Penny / Mashup of Ant Vs Dec and In For A Penny. Ant & Dec play some of the shows games along with members of the public	Draw	2	2
7	13 April 2024	Penalties / Ant and Dec compete in a penalty shootout featuring Ben Foster as goalkeeper	Dec	2	3

Ant & Dec Undercover

Show	Date	Description	Location
1	24 February 2024	2nd Undercover hit on Simon Cowell	Malibu and the America's Got Talent studio

Public Pranks

Show	Date	Description	Location
2	2 March 2024	Shenanigans as a check-in machine.	Vue, Leicester Square
4	23 March 2024	Ant and Dec prank shoppers with the Turbo till.	Asda, Milton Keynes

Little Ant & Dec

Show	Date	Description
1	24 February 2024	The third iteration of Little Ant & Dec are revealed after an audition process
2	2 March 2024	Little Ant & Dec interview Olivia Colman and Jessie Buckley
4	23 March 2024	Little Ant & Dec interview Paul Rudd

I’m A Celebrity...Get Out Of Me Ear!

Show	Date	Celebrity	Description
3	9 March 2024	Lorraine Kelly	Shopping in a department store
6	6 April 2024	Ant & Dec (as ‘Get Out Of Me Ear: The Revenge)	For the final hit, celebrities including Simon Cowell, Amanda Holden, Rylan Clark, Holly Willoughby, Dermot O'Leary, Alison Hammond, Oti Mabuse, Olly Murs, Cheryl, Davina McCall, Craig David, Richard Madeley, Teddy Quinn and Gino D’Acampo give instructions to Ant & Dec
7	13 April 2024	Ant & Dec (as ‘Get Out Of Me Ear: The Revenge)	For the final hit, celebrities including Simon Cowell, Amanda Holden, Rylan Clark, Holly Willoughby, Dermot O'Leary, Alison Hammond, Oti Mabuse, Olly Murs, Cheryl, Davina McCall, Craig David, Richard Madeley, Teddy Quinn and Gino D’Acampo give instructions to Ant & Dec

Singalong Live

Show	Date	Singer(s)	Song
4	23 March 2024	McFly	5 Colours in Her Hair
5	30 March 2024	JLS	Everybody in Love and She Makes Me Wanna ft. Sam Thompson
7	13 April 2024	Tony Hadley	Gold
7	13 April 2024	S Club	Reach
7	13 April 2024	Kaiser Chiefs	I Predict a Riot

What's Next?

Show	Date	Event
4	23 March 2024	Dreadtime story with Cat Deeley and Ben Shephard

"End of the Show" - Show

Show	Date	Celebrity	Performance
1	24 February 2024	Becky Hill and Urban Theory	Medley of Becky's hits: Never Be Alone, Disconnect, My Heart Goes (La Di Da) & Remember whilst Ant & Dec join Urban Theory in hand based choreography
2	2 March 2024	Ella Eyre and Tiggs Da Author	Head in the Ground featuring Ant & Dec and Matt Lucas
3	9 March 2024	Olly Alexander	Dizzy featuring Ant & Dec, Stephen Mulhern and Joe Lycett on a turntable stage.
4	23 March 2024	Adam Garcia and the cast of Chitty Chitty Bang Bang on tour	Performance of Old Bamboo and Bang Bang Chitty Chitty Bang Bang featuring Ant & Dec attempting a Bamboo Stick routine.
5	30 March 2024	The Blue Man Group	Ant & Dec perform with the Blue Man Group using music and paint.
6	6 April 2024	Take That	Performance of "You and Me".
7	13 April 2024	Everyone	Performance of "All About You" by McFly and "Celebration" by Kool & The Gang.

Star Guest Announcers:

- 24 February: Stephen Merchant
- 2 March: Matt Lucas
- 9 March: Joe Lycett
- 23 March: Maya Jama
- 30 March: Matt & Emma Willis
- 6 April: Lenny Rush
- 13 April: Girls Aloud
