= The Paul Daniels Magic Show series 1 =

The Paul Daniels Magic Show
- Season 1
- Starring: Paul Daniels
- No. of episodes: 4 + 1 Special

Release
- Original network: BBC
- Original release: 9 June – 22 December 1979

Series chronology
- Next → 2

The Paul Daniels Magic Show is a British magic show presented by entertainer and magician Paul Daniels that aired on BBC1 from 9 June 1979 to 18 June 1994. At its peak in the 1980s, the show regularly attracted viewing figures of 15 million and was sold to 43 countries.

Series 1 consisted of 4 regular episodes and 1 Christmas Special.

== Episodes ==
No. in series	Featured Guests	Directed by	Magic Associate	Original release date
1	Bob Bramson, The Morettis, Albrecht Roser, The Paul Daniels Magic Set, The Maggie Stredder Singers	Paul Ciani	Ali Bongo	9 June 1979
2	George Carl, The Morettis, The Paul Daniels Magic Set, The Maggie Stredder Singers	Paul Ciani	Ali Bongo	16 June 1979
3	Teddy Peiro and Patricio, The Morettis, Capt.Jim Fox, The Paul Daniels Magic Set, The Maggie Stredder Singers	Paul Ciani	Ali Bongo	23 June 1979
4	Ray Reardon, The Morettis, The Paul Daniels Magic Set, The Maggie Stredder Singers	Paul Ciani	Ali Bongo	30 June 1979
Special	Jeffery Atkins, Duo Brumbach, Bablu Mallick, Wong Mow Ting, Henry Cooper, Cher Adeyinka, Jacki Barron, Pam Quinn, The Paul Daniels Magic Set	Paul Ciani	Ali Bongo	22 December 1979
