= Wizbit =

- Created by: Barry Murray; Paul Daniels
- Starring: Paul Daniels; Debbie McGee
- Country of origin: United Kingdom
- No. of seasons: 3
- No. of episodes: 27 (14 missing, 4 incomplete)

Production
- Production locations: Ewart Television Studios (Series 1); IDC Stonebridge Studios (Series 2); Cannon Elstree Studios (Series 3)
- Running time: 12 x 25mins, 15 x 10mins
- Production companies: White Magic Productions; World Audio Visual Entertainment plc.

Original release
- Network: BBC1
- Release: 8 January 1986 – 10 February 1988

Wizbit is a 1980s BBC children's television show about an alien magician, Wizbit. It starred the established TV and stage magician Paul Daniels and his assistant Debbie McGee.

The series is set in Puzzleopolis, a town inhabited by walking, talking sponge-balls, dice, magic wands, playing cards and rabbits, where the protagonists must solve puzzles. Wizbit's year-and-a-day mission is to find out all about planet Earth.

The show is partly educational, with the (often lateral thinking) puzzles Wizbit is set often being presented to the audience at home, with the solutions being revealed towards the end of the episode. Wizbit's magic word was "Ostagazuzulum", and he came from the planet WOW, an acronym for "World of Wizards".

The show was created by Barry Murray, who had formerly been Mungo Jerry's record producer, with assistance from Daniels. Its theme tune is based on a song by Lead Belly, named "Ha-Ha This A Way", sung by Daniels. All rights to characters and designs were retained by Daniels, and the music rights by Murray.

Production for the series started in 1985.

Despite the show's cancellation in 1988, re-runs continued to air until 24 July 1989. A CGI revival of the series was announced in 2009 with a movie set for Summer 2010 with the production of the reboot was ready to being made in 2007 but they were both cancelled and the production of the Wizbit revival stopped. Books based on said revival have been released however.

The show was also broadcast in Singapore, Ireland, Malaysia, and on British forces television in Germany and Cyprus.

== Characters ==
- Wizbit, a large yellow cone-shaped wizard's hat, voiced by Paul Daniels and played by Tony Friel
- Wooly, an 8-foot-tall (2.4 m) white rabbit, best friend of Wizbit, also voiced by Paul Daniels
- Wilbur, Wooly's younger brother
- Squidgy Bog, a purple swamp monster, voiced by Martin Daniels
- Professor Doom, a moustachioed evil genius and arch-villain who lives in a castle, which sits atop a giant stone fist in the sky. Played by Rob Inglis
- Jinx, Professor Doom's cat
- Badbit, an evil version of Wizbit generated by Professor Doom
- The Gatekeeper, a woman who guarded the gates to Puzzleopolis by refusing to let anyone in until they had solved a riddle, played by Vicky Licorish
- Madame Martinka, a fortune teller who owned the magic shop in Puzzleopolis
- Grocer Green, a greengrocer with green hair
- Pierre Oe, a mime artist
- Spoof & Bluff
- Paul Daniels (playing himself) who owned the theatre in Puzzleopolis
- Various townsfolk shaped like magician's props - spongeballs, dice, wands and so forth
- Troll, a hideous and vicious purple-haired hag.

== Episodes ==
1. Enter Wizbit (8 January 1986)
2. Nasinamon Island (15 January 1986): Spoof and Bluff get into a very nasty situation while out fishing. Guess who gets them in it? Aldibirontiofornifoscio is an evil magic word used by an evil magic man to make up evil magic water that makes all the Puzzleopolians very sad. Wizbit sees that fairplay prevails.
3. A Game of 'Hanki-poo' (22 January 1986): Professor Doom elicits the help of two very shady characters to bamboozle poor old Wooly, the white rabbit. Wonderful Wizbit comes to the rescue with some magical 'Hanki-poo' of his own.
4. Squidgy Bog Cracks Up (29 January 1986): Outside Puzzleopolis lies a dank, wet, oozy purple bog called Squidgy.
5. The Super Riddle (5 February 1986): The Gatekeeper will not let anybody into Puzzleopolis until they have answered the riddle of the day. Today's riddle is just a piece of blank paper. Pierre-Oh, the clown, also loses his nose. Wizbit comes to the rescue.
6. The Grand Conjuring Contest (12 February 1986): The Grand Conjuring Contest Everybody in Puzzleopolis has an act of their own in the show at Paul's Playhouse, even Professor Doom, though in disguise. The Maskelyne Cup is first prize but somebody is up to their old skulduggery again. How does Wizbit save the day and who wins the cup?
7. A Foggy Day in Puzzleopolis (15 December 1986): 'Sports day schmortz day' is Wooly the unathletic rabbit's view of the Puzzleopolis sports day. Professor Doom agrees and does something about it, something very bad.
8. It Can Be Done (29 December 1986)
9. Treasure (6 January 1988)
10. Badbit (13 January 1988)
11. The King of Puzzleopolis (20 January 1988)
12. The Christmas That Nearly Never Was Part 1 (27 January 1988)
13. The Christmas That Nearly Never Was Part 2 (3 February 1988)

== Links ==
- Wizbit at IMDb
- Retro Junk
- ! It's all bad news for Squidgy Bog. edisparadise
