= Lilly Yokoi =

American bicyclist (1929–2026)

- Yokai in 1978
- Born: January 16, 1929; New York City, U.S.
- Died: May 11, 2026 (aged 96); Tokyo, Japan
- Occupation: Acrobat

Lilly Yokoi (November 15, 1929 – May 11, 2026) was an American bicycle acrobat known as "The Ballerina on the Golden Bicycle". Yokoi toured with her family, going solo after her appearance on The Ed Sullivan Show in 1956 and became one of the most sought-after circus performers of her time.

== Background ==
Yokoi was born on November 15, 1929 in New York City to a family of circus and vaudeville performers. Her Tokyo born father Eizo (also known as Shonan) learned how to do tricks after receiving a bicycle from an American friend when he was a teenager. Later he abandoned pursuing a law degree as he began performing trick cycling, eventually all over the world along with his wife. They trained their children in the art form becoming the Yokoi Family Bicycle Troupe or simply Yokoi Troupe and settled in the United States. Performing together as a family Lilly became the stand-out for her difficult tricks, most notably the "Boomerang Swing" where she swings herself around the bike several times in quick succession while the bike is in motion.

== Solo career ==
According to research by the University of Sheffield, in 1956 Yokoi had her breakthrough after appearing without her family on The Ed Sullivan Show, which began her solo career.

Earlier in her solo career Yokoi toured with the Harlem Globetrotters, where she performed before the main event and between breaks. In 1959 owner Abe Saperstein said she was "the greatest performer we've ever had with us".

After receiving an 18 karat gold-plated bike as a gift, Yokoi became known as "The Ballerina on the Golden Bicycle". In 1961 she performed at Radio City Music Hall where she took apart and reassembled the new bike while in motion. Variety noted her "fantastic gymnastics, balancing feats and other daring deeds".

Throughout her career Yokoi appeared on various television shows such as What's My Line?, The Paul Daniels Magic Show, and the Royal Variety Performance, and shared the stage with many circus luminaries around the world. About her performance while touring with the Circus Knie in 1962, Variety stated, "Working on a golden bike, she has lost none of her charm and grace nor the amazing skill with which she handles her vehicle though some of the Impact seems to wear off with repeated viewing."

Yokoi was in such high demand that the Bertram Mills Circus had to book her four years in advance for their 1963 BBC television special. In Mills' 1967 book, Bertram Mills Circus: Its Story, he stated Yokoi "... was one of the greatest performers I ever engaged. She was an artiste down to her fingertips..."

In the mid-1960's Yokio was featured in the documentary film Rings Around The World about the world's 19 greatest circus acts of the time, performed in the Las Vegas stage show Hello, America and made another appearance on The Ed Sullivan Show. In the 1970s she toured with the Greatest Circus on Earth, again with the Harlem Globetrotters and performed at Blackpool Tower Circus in Lancashire, where in 1982 Yokoi made her last known appearance.

== Personal life and death ==
Yokoi was known to be a private person. She married Ronald Johansson in 1955, a Swedish acrobat known as Rolando with whom she had a daughter. After she and Johansson divorced she moved to Japan. Yokoi died in Tokyo on May 11, 2026, at the age of 96.

== Works cited ==
- Tatarsky, Daniel (2016-10-01). The Splendid Book of the Bicycle: From boneshakers to Bradley Wiggins. Portico. ISBN 978-1-911042-63-1.
- Delfont, Bernard Baron (January 25, 1989). Curtain Up!: The Story of the Royal Variety Performance. Robson. ISBN 978-0-86051-629-3
- Mills, Cyril Bertram (1967). Bertram Mills Circus: Its Story. Hutchinson. ISBN 978-0-906798-22-5.
