= Ali Bongo (magician) =

British comedy magician (1929–2009)

- Born: William Oliver Wallace; 8 December 1929; Bangalore, British India
- Died: 8 March 2009 (aged 79); London, England
- Occupation: Magician

William Oliver Wallace (8 December 1929 – 8 March 2009), known by his stage name Ali Bongo, was a British comedy magician and former president of The Magic Circle, who performed an act in which he was known as the "Shriek of Araby".

== Early life ==
Bongo was born as William Oliver Wallace in Bangalore, British India, where his father (also called William) was serving as a sergeant major with the 1st Battalion of the Queen's Own Royal West Kent Regiment. Young William spent his early years on a British station in Trimulgherry, Secunderabad, before going to Britain with his mother Lillian at the age of seven.

After William Wallace senior had ended his army service, the family moved to Sutton Valence in Kent and young William won a scholarship to Sutton Valence School, leaving at the age of 16 to begin his career as an entertainer. His time in National Service was spent with the Royal Army Pay Corps. He worked for Harry Stanley's Unique Magic Studio and was manager of the magic department at Hamleys toy shop in London's Regent Street.

== Career ==
Wallace created his 'Shriek of Araby' character with an oriental costume (robes, golden curly-toed slippers, horn-rimmed spectacles and headgear that incorporated both fez and turban) and took the name Ali Bongo from a character he had created for a youth club pantomime that he had co-written and appeared in while in his teens. The original character had sung a song which began: "My name is Ali Bongo and I come from Pongo, pong-tiddley-pongo land." Among his later magic catchphrases were "Uju Buju Suck Another Juju", "Aldy Bority Phostico Formio", and "Hocus Pocus Fishbones Chokus".

He made his British television debut on The Good Old Days in 1965 on a bill topped by Tommy Trinder. Ali Bongo wrote many books on magic, many containing tricks of his own. He also illustrated them in his instantly recognisable style. He acted as magic consultant for many plays, opera, ballets and TV shows including David Nixon's Magic Box and The David Nixon Magic Show for Thames Television and The Paul Daniels Magic Show for the BBC.

Ali Bongo was the presenter of Ali Bongo's Cartoon Carnival, which featured himself and his assistant Oscar. It aired on UK TV BBC1 on Saturdays between 23 October and 18 December 1971 for a total of nine episodes.

Bongo was featured in an episode of children's TV show Rainbow, appeared in the science fiction show The Tomorrow People in the serial "Revenge of Jedikiah", and had a slot in Zokko!. He also acted as the magical advisor on the TV show Doctor Who and the 1970s cult series Ace of Wands. In 1988 he made a brief appearance in the LWT newspaper-based comedy show Hot Metal. His well-known ability for devising tricks and illusions and solving magical problems inspired the TV writer David Renwick to create a character who was a magician's assistant and amateur sleuth in the series Jonathan Creek. Bongo was magical adviser to the series.

Bongo joined The Magic Circle in 1960, and two years later was made a Member of The Inner Magic Circle. He won The Magic Circle Magician of the Year in 1972, the Carlton Comedy Award in 1983, and the David Berglas Award in 1991. He served twice as vice-president of The Magic Circle before being elected president on 8 September 2008.

== Death ==
At the beginning of February 2009, Bongo collapsed while giving a lecture in Paris. He was taken to hospital and, whilst there, suffered a stroke. He was subsequently returned to the United Kingdom and cared for in St Thomas's Hospital, London, where he later died from complications arising from pneumonia on 8 March. Ali Bongo's cremation and broken wand ceremony took place on 27 March 2009 at Randalls Park Crematorium, Leatherhead.
