= In for a Penny (game show) =

- Genre: Game show
- Created by: Ant & Dec
- Presented by: Stephen Mulhern
- Country of origin: United Kingdom
- Original language: English
- No. of series: 6
- No. of episodes: 50

Production
- Production location: Various
- Running time: 30 minutes (inc. adverts)
- Production companies: ITV Studios Entertainment (2019–2020); Lifted Entertainment (2021–2024); Mitre Television (2019–2020); Mitre Studios (2021–2024)

Original release
- Network: ITV
- Release: 13 April 2019 – 8 June 2024

Related
- Ant & Dec's Saturday Night Takeaway

In for a Penny is a British game show hosted by Stephen Mulhern, based on the segment of the same name in the show Ant & Dec's Saturday Night Takeaway. The show began airing on Saturday nights on ITV1 from 13 April 2019 to 8 June 2024.

== History ==
The show was announced, in April 2018, during the finale of the fifteenth series of Ant & Dec's Saturday Night Takeaway. The series began on 13 April 2019. On 9 July 2019, it was announced the show would return for a second series and a Christmas special. On 4 August 2020, filming began for a third series, with all social distancing guidelines being followed amid the COVID-19 pandemic. During August 2021, filming for a fourth series commenced, which started airing on 9 April 2022. During August 2022, filming for a fifth series commenced, which started airing on 15 April 2023.

== Format ==
Stephen Mulhern explores the streets of various UK towns and cities to find people to complete various challenges. The challenges include filling cars with an exact amount of fuel and guessing the prices of items on a conveyor belt. Each show ends with the 'In for a Penny, In for a Grand' finale game, which includes people doing silly things in order to win £1,000.

=== Segments ===
The programme consists of many different segments and games through the series. Some of them take place on a fixed location, others take place outdoors. These games include:

Introduced in Series 1 (2019)

- Pump It Up: This game takes place on a petrol station where Stephen greets drivers and asks them how much petrol they want to put in their car. If they can pump exactly the correct amount in two tries, Stephen will pay for their petrol. If not, the contestant must pay for their own petrol.
- Mum's The Word: In this game which takes place either indoors or outdoors, people are asked to call their mum and describe a word (which changes on each episode). They're not allowed to say the word or three other specified related words and if that happens, they leave empty-handed. But if the mum guesses correctly, they win £100.
- Check It Out: This game takes place in a supermarket where Stephen checks out people's shopping. All the shoppers have to do is say whether one item of shopping is more or less expensive than the last. If they get all of them right, Stephen will pay their shopping trolley. If they fail, they must pay for their own shopping trolley.
- Weigh To Go: This game takes place in an airport where Stephen meets members of the public at a check in desk, where they have to guess how heavy their suitcase is. If the get it correct, they win £100. If they get it wrong, they have to add or remove items from the suitcase to make it correct. If after three attempts, they still haven't got it right, they walk away with nothing.
- Whatever The Weather: In this outdoor game, players face five buckets, only one of them is filled with confetti, the other four are filled with water. Each contestant has three chances. If they get the confetti, they win £50, but starting from series 4, finding the confetti awards £55.
- Balanced Diet: In this game, one person has a minute to balance as much fruit and veg as they can onto their partner. Whoever's holding the greengrocery tries to balance it for a further 10 seconds. If they succeed, the value of the fruit and veg would be multiplied by 5.
- Pablo Petcasso: This game takes place in a pet shop. The players must draw an animal, if their friend guesses it, they'll win £20. The process repeats for five times.
- Get your Skates on: This game takes place on an ice rink

Introduced in Series 2 (2020)

- Driving Me Round The Bend: In this outdoor game, people must reverse their car into a parking space without touching the white lines which it happens, they walk away with nothing. However, doing it properly, awards £100.
- You Are What You Eat: This 2-player game is all about guessing what the other is eating, however they're blindfolded. One of the members of the public is fed a piece of food, and they have to describe it to the other person. Each correct answer they get wins them £10.
- Don't Rain On My Charade: In this outdoor game, two players are drenched by water spilled by a watering can and they have to answer as many charades as they can, every correct charade awards £20.
- Drawing a Bank: In this 2-player outdoor game, there are many famous characters whose faces are seen on some fake banknotes, all the players have to do is describing as much as they can to the other in 2 minutes. Each correct answer awards £10.
- Cross Dressing: In this 2-player game, they have to swap their clothes as they can in 30 seconds and for every piece of clothing they switch off, they win £10.
- Gelatto Fun: This 2-player outdoor game takes place outside an ice cream truck, one player has three attempts to launch the ice cream from the ladder onto the cone, if they succeed, they win £99, otherwise they leave empty-handed..

Introduced in Series 3 (2021)

- Pet Vet: In this game, the players dog must sit and stay on a giant golden coin. Players must then take 5 steps backwards, if the dog stays, they win £100. If the dog moves even one inch, they walk away with nothing.
- Pound Pong: In this game, players must bounce 5 balls into 10 cups, some of them have "Lose All" which reduces the winnings down to zero, but the rest of them contain cash values ranging between 1p to £100.
- Sausage Roll: In this 2-player game, the aim is to roll a sausage roll up their partner's body and into their mouth in less than 90 seconds, if it falls, use the hands or run out of time, they leave with nothing, but if they're successful, they win £100.

Introduced in Series 4 (2022)

- Get Trolleyed: In this outdoor game, the players have to push their trolley into the back of other trolley, but they're not allowed to let their feet cross the line. If they succeed, they win £50. If they fail, they have another go, but if they still haven't got it, they lose and walk away empty-handed.
- Splitting Hairs: This game takes place on a barber shop, where the players see how some guys have some towels in their heads, they must work out on whether the guy has hair or not, every correct guess add £10. But at the end of the game they have the chance to double the money if they're correct or lose everything if wrong!
- Partners Under Pressure
- Where does the bus stop at the Bus Stop?: This outdoor game takes place on a bus stop, where players must place a golden penny at where they think the bus doors will open. If they place their coin in the correct position, Stephen would pay for their bus fare and they would be given an extra £30 but if they fail, they will leave with nothing and they would pay for their own bus fare.
- Pound Pint Push: In this game, players have to push a pint across the table in an attempt to win some cash, if they make it to the blue they win the cash amount attached on it which ranges from 20p to £100, but if they get to the red zone, they lose everything. However, if they end on "Button's Up", the barman or barsmaid will spray at them!

Introduced in Series 5 (2023)

- Leaning Tower of Pounds
- Left Hanging: In this game, players lend Stephen their phone and he will scroll down the contact list, as soon the contestant says "Stop". They'll phone that person, if they pick it in five rings or less, they win £20 which they can decide to take it or risk it for the chance to double their money. If they fail on one, they walk away empty-handed.

Introduced in Series 6 (2024)

- Diving for Dosh: This game takes place in an indoor pool, where players celebrity knowledge is put to the test.
- Paint for Pounds: This head-to-head game
- Hoover Manoeuvre: In this game, players have to guess which robot hoover will win a race.
- Get Saucy: This 2-player game
- Romance or Showmance: This game sees a groom and four possible brides.
- Roll It: This game sees players rolling a toilet roll down a money ladder

=== In for a Penny, In for a Grand ===
At the end of each episode, Stephen approaches members of the public shopping on the high street, to take part in a special game show, but only if they have a penny on them. Each contestant takes part in five rounds - four focusing on different challenges, and the final focusing on stopping at a selected number of seconds (i.e. stopping between 9–10 seconds) - and should they complete all five, they win £1,000, but if they fail on one, the game ends and the entire production crew run off to find the next contestant, much to Stephen's frustration.

== Series overview ==
| Series | Episodes | Start date | End date |
|---|---|---|---|
| 1 | 7 | 13 April 2019 | 25 May 2019 |
| Christmas Special | 1 | 21 December 2019 | |
| 2 | 7 | 28 March 2020 | 9 May 2020 |
| Christmas Special | 1 | 26 December 2020 | |
| 3 | 8 | 17 April 2021 | 12 June 2021 |
| Christmas Special | 1 | 27 December 2021 | |
| 4 | 8 | 9 April 2022 | 4 June 2022 |
| Christmas Special | 1 | 24 December 2022 | |
| 5 | 7 | 15 April 2023 | 3 June 2023 |
| Christmas Special | 1 | 25 December 2023 | |
| 6 | 8 | 20 April 2024 | 8 June 2024 |

=== Episodes ===
| Series | Episode | Airdate | Location |
|---|---|---|---|
| 1 | 1 | 13 April 2019 | Cardiff |
| 1 | 2 | 20 April 2019 | Norwich |
| 1 | 3 | 27 April 2019 | Bournemouth |
| 1 | 4 | 4 May 2019 | Newcastle |
| 1 | 5 | 11 May 2019 | Glasgow |
| 1 | 6 | 18 May 2019 | Leeds |
| 1 | 7 | 25 May 2019 | Southend |
| Christmas Special | | 21 December 2019 | Manchester |
| 2 | 1 | 28 March 2020 | Nottingham |
| 2 | 2 | 4 April 2020 | Bristol |
| 2 | 3 | 11 April 2020 | Bognor Regis |
| 2 | 4 | 18 April 2020 | Swansea |
| 2 | 5 | 25 April 2020 | York |
| 2 | 6 | 2 May 2020 | Northampton |
| 2 | 7 | 9 May 2020 | Belfast |
| Christmas Special | | 26 December 2020 | Bath |
| 3 | 1 | 17 April 2021 | Sheffield |
| 3 | 2 | 24 April 2021 | Southampton |
| 3 | 3 | 1 May 2021 | Cambridge |
| 3 | 4 | 8 May 2021 | Chester |
| 3 | 5 | 15 May 2021 | Barry Island |
| 3 | 6 | 22 May 2021 | Blackpool |
| 3 | 7 | 29 May 2021 | Torquay |
| 3 | 8 | 12 June 2021 | Somerset^{[a]} |
| Christmas Special | | 27 December 2021 | Chelmsford |
| 4 | 1 | 9 April 2022 | Birmingham |
| 4 | 2 | 16 April 2022 | Sunderland |
| 4 | 3 | 23 April 2022 | Plymouth |
| 4 | 4 | 30 April 2022 | Newport |
| 4 | 5 | 7 May 2022 | Portsmouth |
| 4 | 6 | 21 May 2022 | Derby |
| 4 | 7 | 28 May 2022 | Great Yarmouth |
| 4 | 8 | 4 June 2022 | Essex^{[b]} |
| Christmas Special | | 24 December 2022 | Peterborough |
| 5 | 1 | 15 April 2023 | Edinburgh |
| 5 | 2 | 29 April 2023 | Lincoln |
| 5 | 3 | 6 May 2023 | Hull |
| 5 | 4 | 13 May 2023 | Liverpool |
| 5 | 5 | 20 May 2023 | Brighton |
| 5 | 6 | 27 May 2023 | Cardiff |
| 5 | 7 | 3 June 2023 | Eastbourne |
| Christmas Special | | 25 December 2023 | Various |
| 6 | 1 | 20 April 2024 | Various^{[c]} |
| 6 | 2 | 27 April 2024 | Various^{[d]} |
| 6 | 3 | 4 May 2024 | Various^{[e]} |
| 6 | 4 | 11 May 2024 | Various^{[f]} |
| 6 | 5 | 18 May 2024 | Various^{[g]} |
| 6 | 6 | 25 May 2024 | Various^{[h]} |
| 6 | 7 | 1 June 2024 | Various^{[i]} |
| 6 | 8 | 8 June 2024 | Walt Disney World |

== Notes ==
- a. Features unseen games from the series and an In for a Penny, In for a Grand game from Bristol.
- b. Features unseen games from the series and an In for a Penny, In for a Grand game from Thurrock.
- c. Features games filmed in Manchester, Leicester, Bournemouth and Bristol.
- d. Features games filmed in Bournemouth, Bristol, Glasgow and Leicester.
- e. Features games filmed in Leicester, Bolton, Bournemouth and Manchester.
- f. Features games filmed in Manchester, Bristol, Glasgow and Bournemouth.
- g. Features games filmed in Glasgow, Leicester, Bristol and Wigan.
- h. Features games filmed in Bournemouth, Glasgow, Leicester and Milton Keynes.
- i. Features games filmed in Luton, Manchester, Leicester and Glasgow.
