= Debbie McGee =

English radio and TV performer (born 1958)

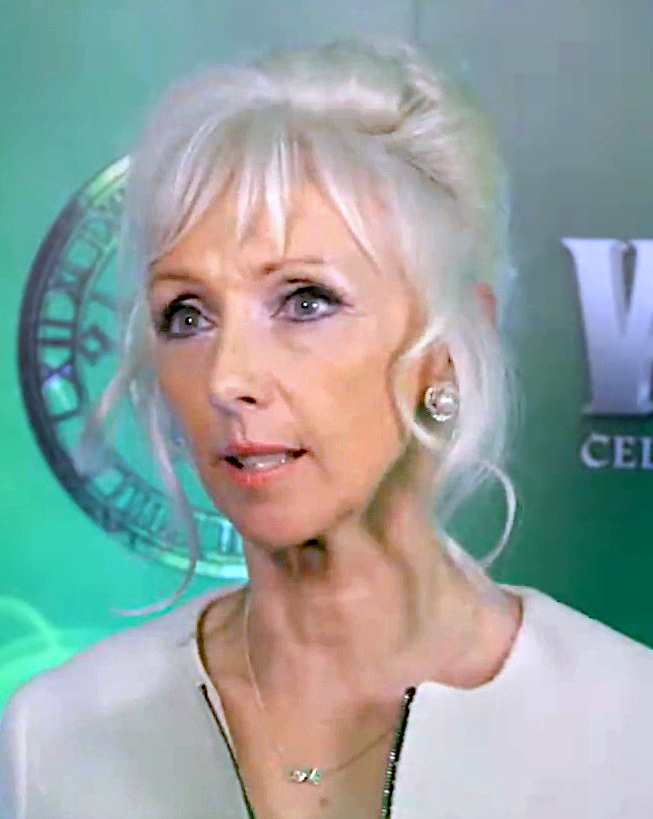
- McGee at Wicked 10th Birthday 2016
- Born: Debra Ann McGee; 31 October 1958 (age 67); Kingston upon Thames, Surrey, England
- Occupations: Radio presenter; magician's assistant
- Years active: 1979–present
- Spouse: Paul Daniels (m. 1988; died 2016)
- Website: debbiemcgee.co.uk

Debra Ann McGee (born 31 October 1958) is an English television, radio and stage performer who is best known as the assistant and widow of magician Paul Daniels.

She performed with Daniels through the 1980s and 1990s on stage and television, including the long-running BBC1 series The Paul Daniels Magic Show. McGee and Daniels married in 1988.

McGee is a former ballet dancer and for three years was artistic director of her own ballet company. She presents a Sunday morning show for BBC Radio Berkshire. McGee was a finalist in BBC's 2017 Strictly Come Dancing and a winner of the 2019 Christmas Special, and has been a recurring member of the Loose Women panel.

== Early life ==
Debra Ann McGee was born on 31 October 1958 in Kingston upon Thames, Surrey, England, to Patrick McGee and Lillian Howes. She has two younger siblings, a sister, Donna and a brother, Robert. When McGee was young her parents ran a corner shop. Later, her father worked for a large manufacturing firm making gold rings and other jewellery.

McGee attended Our Lady Immaculate RC Primary School in Tolworth, then Tolworth Girls' School for secondary school.

== Career ==
Aged 16, McGee auditioned for and won a place at the Royal Ballet School. After graduating, she joined the Iranian National Ballet Company in Tehran. Aged 19, she became part of the Corps de Ballet and later a soloist, but her ballet career was brought to an abrupt halt by the Iranian Revolution. She was forced to flee and returned to the UK with little money or possessions. Seeking new work she auditioned for the Bernard Delfont Organisation, which was responsible for a number of big summer resort shows and touring productions.

=== Magic with Paul Daniels ===
Delfont found her a job performing on stage with magician Paul Daniels in his 1979 summer show at the Britannia Pier Theatre in Great Yarmouth. She met Daniels on 23 May 1979 at rehearsals for the show, which were held at a church hall in London.

She later joined Dougie Squires's Second Generation troupe as a dancer, which involved touring Europe with acts including Chris de Burgh and James Last. After winter work in pantomime, McGee joined Daniels again for his 1980 summer season in Bournemouth. She then performed in his London stage show It's Magic, which opened on 10 December 1980 and which, by the time it closed 14 months later, had become the longest-running magic show ever to play in the West End.

McGee achieved national and international fame through television appearances with Daniels. After seeing her on stage in the West End, BBC producer John Fisher asked Debbie to appear in the BBC1 series The Paul Daniels Magic Show, which had begun in 1979. That series continued until 1994 and regularly attracted audiences of 15 million in the UK and was sold to 43 countries. Daniels regularly referred to McGee on his TV shows as "the lovely Debbie McGee", a phrase that entered popular culture as a stereotype for magicians' assistants.

Daniels and McGee were married in Buckinghamshire in April 1988.

In October 1991, McGee was one of the first female magicians to become a member of The Magic Circle, a society for British professional magicians. She celebrated by appearing on TV to perform a trick accompanied by Daniels as her assistant "The Lovely Paul", who was not allowed to speak during the performance.

McGee was the 2017 winner of the Magic Circle's Maskelyne Award "for services to British Magic", the same award that her husband received in 1988.

=== Dance company ===
In 2000, McGee and Daniels set up Ballet Imaginaire to produce ballet shows and tour them around the country. The enterprise was never intended to be financially successful (as acknowledged in When Louis Met...) but in the three years it was active it did achieve its objective of allowing McGee to fulfil a lifelong dream of producing ballet and achieving recognition as a dancer.

=== Radio ===
In 2004 McGee presented Box Jumpers, a two-part radio documentary about magician's assistants for BBC Radio 4. She works as a presenter for BBC Radio Berkshire, where, since 8 June 2008, she has hosted a regular Sunday morning show from 9 am to noon.

On 12 June 2018, McGee was a guest on the BBC Radio 4 programme My Teenage Diaries.

=== Television ===
McGee appeared on comedian Caroline Aherne's talk show The Mrs Merton Show in 1995; Aherne's character Mrs Merton asked McGee "what first attracted you to the millionaire Paul Daniels?", a joke which a poll later ranked as Britain's second-best one-liner. Calling the continuing popularity of the joke "lovely", McGee credits the appearance on Mrs Merton for kickstarting her own fame, saying "after Mrs Merton people started to really recognise me. It gave us great publicity."

In 2001, McGee and Daniels were the subjects of an episode of When Louis Met..., a documentary filmed by Louis Theroux. The episode, titled When Louis Met... Paul and Debbie, was broadcast on BBC Two and subsequently Netflix.

In 2001, McGee appeared in the documentary Paul Daniels in a Black Hole, which challenged Daniels to be recognised as a famed magician in the United States within one week.

In October 2004, McGee and Daniels appeared on The Farm, Five's version of the RTÉ show Celebrity Farm. In May 2006, she appeared on The X Factor: Battle of the Stars with her husband singing "Let Me Entertain You" by Robbie Williams. Debbie and Paul were knocked out in the first round of the talent show.

On 1 April 2007, McGee appeared along with Daniels, Vanessa Feltz, and her then-fiancé Ben Ofoedu in a celebrity edition of Channel 4's reality television show Wife Swap. In 2008 McGee appeared on Ant & Dec's Saturday Night Takeaway. On 14 September 2010, McGee appeared on the celebrity version of Come Dine with Me.

In 2012, McGee made a cameo appearance as herself in an episode of the UK TV comedy drama Stella.

She took part in Celebrity MasterChef in 2017. In August 2017, it was announced that McGee would be appearing as a contestant on the fifteenth series of Strictly Come Dancing where her professional dance partner was Giovanni Pernice. The couple reached the final but were beaten by Joe McFadden and Katya Jones.

| Week # | Dance / Song | Judges' scores | | | | | Result |
|---|---|---|---|---|---|---|---|
| Week # | Dance / Song | Horwood | Bussell | Ballas | Tonioli | Total | Result |
| 1 | Paso doble / "Be Italian" | 8 | 8 | 7 | 7 | 30 | No elimination |
| 2 | Viennese waltz / "She's Always a Woman" | 8 | 9 | 9 | 8 | 34 | Safe |
| 3 | Quickstep / "Let's Call the Whole Thing Off" | 6 | 7 | 7 | 8 | 28 | Safe |
| 4 | Cha-cha-cha / "The Shoop Shoop Song (It's in His Kiss)" | 6 | 7 | 7 | 8 | 28 | Safe |
| 5 | Rumba / "Baby Can I Hold You" | 9 | 9 | 9 | 9 | 36 | Safe |
| 6 | Charleston / "Frankie" | 9 | 10 | 10 | 10 | 39 | Safe |
| 7 | Tango / "I Gotta Feeling" | 10 | 10 | 10 | 10 | 40 | Safe |
| 8 | Salsa / "Can't Take My Eyes Off You" | 9 | 9 | 8 | 9 | 35 | Safe |
| 9 | Samba / "Wannabe/Who Do You Think You Are" | 7 | 8 | 9 | 9 | 33 | Bottom two |
| 10 | Argentine tango / "Por una Cabeza" | 9 | 9 | 10 | 10 | 38 | Safe |
| 11 | American Smooth / "Memory" | 9 | 10 | 10 | 10 | 39 | Safe |
| 12 | Jive / "I'm So Excited"; Foxtrot / "Isn't She Lovely" | 7; 8 | 9; 9 | 9; 9 | 9; 10 | 34; 36 | Safe |
| 13 | Salsa / "Can't Take My Eyes Off You"; Freestyle / "One Day I'll Fly Away"; Argentine tango / "Por una Cabeza" | 9; 9; 10 | 10; 9; 10 | 10; 10; 10 | 10; 10; 10 | 39; 38; 40 | Runner-up |

In November 2017 she appeared alongside Chesney Hawkes in Celebrity Antiques Road Trip.

In December 2019, McGee appeared in the quiz show Tenable All Stars for a Christmas special.

She has been a recurring member of the Loose Women panel.

=== Other activities ===
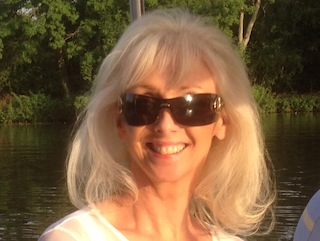
Debbie McGee in 2013

A cookery and party book written by McGee, called Dine with Debbie - A Magical Touch, was published. In 2005 she became the brand ambassador for "Good Boy" chocolates.

In 2006, McGee and friend Sue Simons created a modelling and casting agency, Debbie McGee Models.

In February 2009, McGee and Daniels appeared in Closer magazine in a picture recreating an image from an Armani advert that featured footballer David Beckham and his wife Victoria. Later in the summer of that year, she appeared in a fringe theatre show in London called Frank's Closet.

On 21 August 2013, McGee took part in the Dead Air Podcast, a show hosted by Nick Lee and Rob Oldfield.

From 9 December 2016 to 1 January 2017, McGee starred in the pantomime Aladdin as Slave of the Ring at the Grand Opera House, York.

She is known for her work with dogs, including as an advocate for canine welfare and the charity Medical Detection Dogs. Alongside her late husband, Paul Daniels, she championed the training of dogs to detect diseases such as cancer and diabetes, participating in high-profile fundraising campaigns to support their research.

== Personal life ==
McGee married Paul Daniels in 1988. Daniels died on 17 March 2016, at the age of 77, a month after being diagnosed with a brain tumour.

McGee's pastimes include golf and she has played in celebrity charity events.

In January 2019, McGee announced that she had overcome the early stages of breast cancer in 2018; after a small surgical procedure she had been given the all-clear.
