= Jeffery Atkins =

British magician

Henry Jeffery Atkins (3 September 1919 – 19 March 2001) was a British magician. He is cited as a major force in the International Brotherhood of Magicians (IBM) British Ring, for which he was honorary secretary and convention organizer for many years. He also served a term as international president of the IBM. As a performer he specialized in revivals or re-creations of antique magic. He made a number of appearances on national television in the United Kingdom. On one occasion he staged a revival of the Radium Girl illusion for the Paul Daniels Magic Show. He is commemorated through the 'Jeffery Atkins memorial lecture' held at the annual convention of the British Ring of the IBM.

== Spelling ==
There is occasionally confusion over the spelling of Atkins' name. His obituary at the Magic Times website used the spelling Jeffery and it has been stated on the Genii magazine forum that this was the correct spelling of his name, not Jeffrey.
