= Hans Moretti =

- Born: Johannes Cewe; 24 July 1928; Beckersdorf, Poland (now Yustynivka, Ukraine)
- Died: 13 March 2013 (aged 84); Dillingen, Saarland, Germany
- Occupations: Illusionist, escapologist
- Spouse: Helga Moretti
- Website: http://www.moretti.de/

Johannes Crewe, more widely known by his stage name Hans Moretti (24 July 1928 – 13 March 2013) was an illusionist and escapologist.

== Life and career ==
Born in Beckersdorf, in what was then the Eastern Galician part of Poland, his family moved to Germany after the signing of the Molotov–Ribbentrop Pact in 1939. He began performing at the age of sixteen, first as a juggler before becoming a magician and escapologist.

During the course of his career he won many awards, including the Grand Illusions award of the FISM (Fédération Internationale des Sociétés Magiques) in 1976 for a routine in which he escaped, unharmed and having changed into a clown costume, from a box through which swords had been thrust by members of the audience, and the Mentalism Award of the FISM in 1979, for a routine in which he played Russian roulette with two loaded revolvers. He was a Member of the Inner Magic Circle with Gold Star, and was appointed to the Order of Merit of the Federal Republic of Germany in recognition of his achievements.

Often assisted by his wife Helga, he appeared as a guest on The Paul Daniels Magic Show on numerous occasions during the 1980s, more times than any other performer, and was billed as "Europe's Greatest Illusionist" when performing in Las Vegas. Throughout his career he broke eighteen world records.

He retired in 2006 after being diagnosed with Alzheimer's disease. His wife Helga predeceased him. They had three children: Hans, Peter and Nicole Moretti, all of whom are also professional magicians.

== Bibliography ==
- Moretti, Hans; Mehler, Ha. A. (1997). Moretti – Eine magische Karriere. Möwe Verlag. ISBN 3-925127-73-9.
