= Ant & Dec's Saturday Night Takeaway =

British television variety show

- Genre: Light entertainment Game show Comedy
- Created by: Anthony McPartlin; Declan Donnelly
- Presented by: Ant & Dec
- Starring: See cast
- Narrated by: Various celebrity guest stars
- Opening theme: "Saturday" (originally by Norma Jean Wright)
- Country of origin: United Kingdom
- Original language: English
- No. of series: 20
- No. of episodes: 139 (+ 1 special) (list of episodes)

Production
- Production locations: The London Studios (2002–2009, 2013–2018); Television Centre (2020–2024)
- Running time: 60–120 minutes (inc. adverts)
- Production companies: Granada Productions (2002–2003, 2004–2006); Granada Television (2003–2004); ITV Studios Entertainment (2006–2021) (Note: Was known as ITV Productions from 2006-2009.); Gallowgate Productions (2006–2009); Mitre Studios (2013–2024) (Note: Was known as Mitre Television from 2013-2021.); Lifted Entertainment (2021–2024)

Original release
- Network: ITV
- Release: 8 June 2002 – 13 April 2024

Related
- In for a Penny

Ant & Dec's Saturday Night Takeaway (referred to simply as Saturday Night Takeaway, Takeaway or SNT) is a British television variety show, presented by Anthony McPartlin and Declan Donnelly (colloquially known as Ant & Dec), which was originally broadcast on ITV from 8 June 2002 to 21 March 2009. The show returned after a 4-year hiatus, airing from 23 February 2013 to 13 April 2024, after which the show went on another hiatus for an undisclosed amount of time. A potential return for the show has not yet been ruled out.

The show's format, heavily influenced by previous Saturday night light entertainment shows such as Noel's House Party, Opportunity Knocks and Don't Forget Your Toothbrush, focused on a mixture of live and pre-recorded entertainment and game-show-influenced segments, as well as interactivity with viewers through prize-giving.

With series averages attracting viewing figures from 5 to 9 million, the programme proved an immense success for the broadcaster, earning several awards including Most Popular Entertainment Programme at the National Television Awards and the BAFTA for Entertainment Programme in 2013, as well as earning awards for the presenters. Its success led to several international versions being created, though most have been short-lived. The show celebrated its 50th episode on 29 September 2007, and its 100th episode on 3 March 2018.

Up until 2018, episodes were broadcast live from Studio 1 at The London Studios. Following the permanent closure of the site after the fifteenth series, the programme moved to Studio TC1 at the Television Centre in West London in 2020. The show entered an indefinite hiatus after the twentieth series in 2024 due to the presenters wanting to spend more time with their families.

== Cast timeline ==
Cast members	Series			
Anthony McPartlin	Main	Main	Main	Main
Declan Donnelly	Main	Main	Main	Main
Kirsty Gallacher	Also starring			
Ashley Roberts		Also starring		
Stephen Mulhern			Also starring	Also starring
Scarlett Moffatt			Also starring	
Fleur East				Also starring
Andi Peters				Also starring
Jordan North				Also starring

== Format ==
The general set up for each episode was a selection of segments consisting of games, comedy/entertainment films, participation by either a studio audience member or unsuspecting viewer, and a show finale consisting of a performance by a musician, dance group, singer, or group performers.

Episodes of Saturday Night Takeaway were broadcast live during the weekend, during a prime-time slot, usually 7 o’clock, on Saturday evenings for the entire run of a series. Each episode was introduced with a line-up of what segments will be featured during its broadcast, along with an introduction of the hosts themselves – from the seventh series onwards, this responsibility was given to a special celebrity announcer, who would not only give an introduction of themselves and the hosts, but would also state what viewers would expect in the show for that episode, along with an update on what was still to come before each commercial break in the programme. Prior to 2022, the opening titles were usually preceded by a cold open scene involving the hosts performing a comedy sketch, similar to the cold openings of the U.S. light entertainment programme Saturday Night Live and usually with celebrity guests for the episode, which ended with them or the celebrities saying – "Roll the titles!"

=== Segments ===
Throughout the show's history, the programme had featured a variety of segments, some based on notable elements in Saturday night TV. However, Saturday Night Takeaway features a regular selection of segments that it uses frequently in the majority of its episodes. These segments include:

Features in Series 20

Segment	Series	Details
Win the Ads	Series 1–20	From Series 1–9, the last segment of an episode, or from Series 10–20, often the penultimate, a member of the audience is randomly selected to take part in a quiz to win a series of prizes. Prior to broadcast, an ITV programme that had been broadcast during the week is randomly selected, whereupon the adverts broadcast during its commercial break(s) are used to create the prizes. Before the quiz begins, the prizes are placed on a grid, concealed, and randomly rearranged, before being given a number. The contestant has 60 seconds to answer as many questions as they can, based on that week's news stories, with each correct answer allowing the contestant to pick a number as their prize at the end. After time is up, the contestant is given the option to take their prizes or gamble for the chance of winning all the prizes if they correctly answer one final question.
An Audience Member's Game	Series 2–20	Played at the beginning of an episode, the segment focuses on the presenters initially picking on certain audience members over something embarrassing about them. However, the last person picked takes part in a specially themed game just for them, in which they receive a prize regardless of the outcome. Research for the game is usually by the production team via input from relations and close friends who nominated the participant.
Ant vs. Dec	Series 5–20	Played throughout a series, the presenters compete against each other in a number of themed challenges in which neither presenter knows what each challenge is about. The winner of the game earns a point, and at the end of the series the winner is the one with the highest score; the loser is forced to undertake a forfeit during the series finale. The segment is joined by Stephen Mulhern, who wears a costume according to the challenge, gives out the rules, relays the results of the challenge, and is sometimes joined by a commentator during the challenge. Starting from Series 18, the segment has been renamed to "Ant Vs Dec Vs...".
Ant & Dec Undercover	Series 2–5; 10–20	The presenters pull a prank on a selected celebrity, involving scripted scenes, such as a situation going wrong for their target. The prank would sometimes include the pair being on scene with their target, but in disguise. The footage is shown with the celebrity present in the studio to watch it and react. In 2020, Ant & Dec apologised for blackface after clips resurfaced from 2003 and 2005, portraying Jamaican women and stereotypically black rappers.
Little Ant & Dec	Series 2–6; 10–14, 20	Two young "look-alikes" of the presenters, nicknamed "Little Ant" and "Little Dec", meet with celebrities and ask them blunt questions regarding various subjects, which sometimes bamboozled the interviewee into giving some surprisingly straight answers. The two children playing each look-alike were recast twice, in the tenth series, and twentieth series after the original actors grew too old.
End of the Show" Show	Series 10–20	The final segment of an episode, it is always a musical number that is performed by a singer or a band alongside the presenters and special guest star(s).
I'm a Celebrity ... Get Out of Me Ear!	Series 10–20	Similar to "Undercover" and introduced in the tenth series, the presenters give a celebrity a concealed earpiece, and task them with doing whatever the pair instruct them to do before unsuspecting public members.
Singalong Live	Series 11–20	The presenters' surprise three unsuspecting viewers, who become contestants in a karaoke-style quiz. Each is tasked with singing a segment of a song that is being sung by its artist, whereupon they must correctly identify a word that is missing from it.
Happiest Minute of the Week	Series 13–20	Ant & Dec celebrate the 'Happiest Minute of the Week' by giving prizes to members of their audience and viewers at home. Despite its name, it actually lasts for around 3 minutes.
Ring My Bell	Series 18–20	An audience member's Ring doorbell can be seen and if that audience member recognises that as their house they have to shout, "ding dong that's my doorbell". Then people who live next to that house have 45 seconds to bring a mystery item and ring the bell. If they do it in time, they and the audience member will win £500.

=== Discontinued segments ===
The following is a list of segments used on the programme in the course of its history, that have since been retired, although may have returned in later series as a one off. These segments include:

Former features

Segment	Series	Details
Grab the Ads	Series 1–9	Run for nine series, the segment focused on one randomly chosen viewer taking part in a prize give out. Viewers are initially asked to phone in for a place in the segment, with the chosen viewer receiving one of nine prizes on offer. Each prize was hidden behind a number – 1 to 9 – and whichever number was chosen was the prize that viewer got.
Banged Up with Beadle	Series 1	This segment functioned liked a spoof of a reality show, in which each week, a different member of the public was chosen to spend seven days locked up in a dungeon at Spitbank Fort in the Solent, with Jeremy Beadle. When they appeared live in the episode on Saturday, they were given a task, in which they won £5,000 if successful.
Jim Didn't Fix It	Series 1–3	This segment functioned as a spoof version of the format for Jim'll Fix It, in which an audience member who had written to Jimmy Savile in their youth for the means to fulfil their dreams but had never been lucky to receive it, were given the chance to realise their dreams years later.
Home Run	Series 1–3; 15–16; 20	This segment focused on unsuspecting members of the public who were not watching the show at home being surprised by the presenters at a public location they were in, shown to viewers and the studio audience via hidden cameras set up at the location. The members selected by the show take part in a race to get back to their home immediately for a cash prize of £3,000.
What's Next?	Series 2–4; 20	The presenters disable their autocues and earpieces and are surprised with a task, challenge or skit they must complete with no prior knowledge.
Opportunity Knocks, Again	Series 2–5	Based upon Opportunity Knocks, the format focused on members of the studio audience, who had previously performed on the show, to repeat their act on Saturday Night Takeaway.
Saturday Cash Takeaway	Series 3	This segment focused on a member of the studio audience randomly selecting one of nine popular takeaways, each being delivered to their customers. The one chosen would then be stuffed with £1,000, which the unsuspecting customer could receive, along with their food, if they answered a question correctly from their front door.
Saturday Night Pub Olympics	Series 4	This segment focused the production team selecting a random pub across the country, in which a number of unsuspecting customers visiting it would be invited to take part in a series of sporting events, dubbed the "Saturday Night Pub Olympics". The members taking part are split into two teams and face off against each other in three different events, with Dickie Davies providing commentary on proceedings.
Beat the Boys	Series 6–8	This segment focused on the presenters competing against a pair of celebrities in a specially themed time-trail event. Each pair would drive around a specially created course in a specific type of vehicle, and attempt to set a fast lap time. For each episode that the segment was featured in, the course included a specially designed set of obstacles that both pairs had to complete correctly; any not completed correctly would incur a ten-second penalty to the pair's lap time.
Jiggy Bank	Series 6–7	This segment focused on a studio audience member being randomly chosen to take part in a game with a cash prize. The game focused on them riding a robotic pig, like a rodeo, and holding for as long as possible, with their time affecting the amount of money they won.
The Mouse Trap	Series 8–9	This segment focused on a viewer being randomly picked to take part in a game. The chosen viewer is given one minute to collect as much cheese from a specially created maze as they could possibly get and escape the maze before time ran out. Each piece of cheese collected was worth £1,000, with a total of five pieces to collect.
Escape from Takeaway Prison	Series 9	This segment focused on twenty celebrities being imprisoned in a fictional prison of the show, in which they competed against each other in a series of games to win their freedom.
Supercomputer	Series 10–13	This segment had a "supercomputer" which would travel around Britain. Members of the public would come up to the computer and hit the red button on the front under the display to begin. The computer would then set a bunch of bizarre tasks and people who did well would be rewarded with a prize.
A Ticket To Slide	Series 12	This segment focused on the presenters choosing a random member of the public to take part in a game in which they, along with their friends and family, had to collect keys while travelling down an inflatable slide. If enough keys were collected, the contestant would win tickets for a vacation to New York.
Make 'Em Laugh	Series 14 (or Make Ant Laugh in Series 1)	This was a one-off segment featuring the presenters against Phillip Schofield & Holly Willoughby. In this game, they have to try and make each laugh out loud. The game ended in a draw (3–3), so there was a live tiebreak and Ant & Dec laughed first, so that meant Schofield and Willoughby were the winners. A similar format was used in Series 1, for a segment called Make Ant Laugh, where members of the public would come on the show to present an act in the hope of making Ant laugh. If they did within a minute, they were presented with an I Made Ant Laugh trophy.
The Pandas	Series 16–17	The boys go undercover as pandas, fooling children at locations such as Hamleys and London Zoo.
Who You Gonna Call?	Series 19	The SNT crew takes 50 audience members' mobile phones away from them and one of the members of the audience gets chosen to play the game. In it, Fleur East has to call someone from that person's phone. They get £250 for each person that accepts the call, but if they get three accepted calls that person wins a place on the plane. However, if one person doesn't accept the call, the game ends and the player loses everything.
In for a Penny	Series 14–15	Hosted by Stephen Mulhern and pre-recorded before an episode, this segment focuses on members of public being approached by Mulhern and taking part in a special gameshow, so long as they can provide a penny. Each contestant takes part in five rounds – four focusing on different challenges, and the final focusing on stopping at a selected number of seconds (i.e. stopping between 9–10 seconds) – and should they complete all five, they win £1,000, otherwise the game ends. At the end of Series 15, ITV confirmed that the segment would be spun-off as its own show.
Read My Lips	Series 13–15; 17–19	A contestant reads various words through a video call to the episode's guest announcer, who wears noise-cancelling headphones, so they have to read the contestant's lips to get the answer. If the contestant manages to get the announcer to say three correct answers, they win a place on the series finale taking place outside of the UK.
Best Seats in the House/Sofa Watch	Series 13–15; 18	These segments focused on viewers participation in which viewers are shown several sofas hidden in various locations in the UK, as shown by live-streaming via an on-site camera for each sofa. To win a place, the viewers must be within range of the location visit it in order to win a prize when the presenters check to see who has found the sofas at a later stage in the episode.
Ant & Dec's Saturday Night Takeaway Presents...	Series 13–19	Starting from the thirteenth series, the programme began airing a mini-serial with each series focused on light-hearted comedy mystery dramas starring Ant & Dec, and are primarily parodies of noted fiction genres from films and television programmes. The first serial, a parody of "whodunnit" crime mystery stories titled "Who Shot Simon Cowell?", focused on the presenters investigating the mysterious sudden shooting of Cowell at his birthday party. After the mini-serial is aired with each series, all episodes are later condensed into a special feature-length episode under the title of Ant & Dec's Saturday Night Takeaway Presents..., and broadcast in late December of that year.
The Takeaway Rainbow	Series 17	Similar to Sofa Watch, this segment involves McPartlin and Donnelly lighting up a rainbow which starts outside the studio and ends at a mystery location, in which viewers have to visit if in the local area to win a prize.
On Air Dares	Series 17–18	Stephen Mulhern surprises TV and Radio presenters by entering their studios and asking them to do dares while on air, unknown to the viewer/listener at the time.
Saturday Night at the Movies	Series 17–19	In this segment, a random family has to act out several movies using props/costumes. The guest announcer has to guess what movie they are acting out, each family and the announcer gets 45 seconds each to act/guess as many movies as they can.
The Takeaway Truck	Series 19	The Takeaway Truck gets driven to a location that's told to the viewers, and if they're near it, they have to get outside and find it. Similarly to Saturday Night at the Movies, a random contestant from an audience gets picked to try and guess what songs the audience is dancing to without listening to it before time runs out.

== Filming ==
Filming for every episode was done both live, for studio segments and off-site broadcasts across the country, and pre-recorded for filmed segments. Live studio segments since the show premiered took place from Studio 1 at The London Studios, and included the backstage areas near to the studio for various sketches and banter by the presenters. Although the presenters were the primary cast members of Saturday Night Takeaway, the show also employs a variety of co-stars who would handle off-site segments. After 2018, live studio segments would cease to be conducted at London Studios following the conclusion of the fifteenth series, owing to the site's imminent closure and sale. Filming for the live studio segments were moved to Studio TC1 at the Television Centre in West London, operated and owned by BBC Studioworks, in time for the sixteenth series launch in February 2020. After the fourth episode of the sixteenth series, the programme's format was tweaked in the wake of the coronavirus pandemic, with the fifth episode on 21 March being broadcast from the studio without an audience, and the final two episodes retooled as 60 minute editions featuring classic moments from past episodes with pre-recorded links by the presenters from their own homes.

In 2016, the production staff and the programme's creators decided to air live finales abroad in other locations, as part of a new prize-giving format involving the provision of travel holiday packages to lucky recipients within the audience and around the country. The first finale to be filmed under this new format element took place aboard the MV Britannia while it was docked in Spain during its cruise journey. The format's success led to further sites abroad being used including Walt Disney World, Florida in 2017, and Universal Orlando in 2018 and returned in 2023. The finale for the sixteenth series in 2020 was originally planned to return to Walt Disney World, but was cancelled both as a precaution against the spread of the coronavirus and due to Disney closing the resort as a result of the pandemic. This was announced on the fourth episode of that series, and all recipients of the prize up to that point would be honoured with a holiday at Walt Disney World for a later date. For the seventeenth series in 2021, the giveaway was presented in the form of a "Takeaway Getaway", allowing recipients to choose where they would like to travel to on an all-inclusive holiday courtesy of TUI. This was also retained on the eighteenth series in 2022 as rules on international travel following the pandemic had still not been fully relaxed by then, and used again in 2024 to ensure the series finale could be broadcast from Television Centre.

== Transmissions ==
Series	Episodes	Originally released		Avg. viewers (millions)
Series	Episodes	First released	Last released	Avg. viewers (millions)
1	6	8 June 2002	13 July 2002	4.76
2	11	11 January 2003	22 March 2003	7.91
3	6	13 March 2004	17 April 2004	7.86
4	6	2 October 2004	6 November 2004	7.97
5	10	12 February 2005	16 April 2005	7.68
Christmas Special		24 December 2005		6.22
6	6	16 September 2006	21 October 2006	7.22
7	6	8 September 2007	13 October 2007	6.25
8	6	16 February 2008	22 March 2008	7.27
9	6	14 February 2009	21 March 2009	6.63
10	7	23 February 2013	6 April 2013	7.82
11	7	22 February 2014	5 April 2014	7.61
12	7	21 February 2015	4 April 2015	7.00
13	7	20 February 2016	2 April 2016	7.78
14	7	25 February 2017	8 April 2017	8.02
15	6	24 February 2018	7 April 2018	8.43
16	7	22 February 2020	4 April 2020	8.54
17	7	20 February 2021	3 April 2021	7.41
18	7	19 February 2022	9 April 2022	5.99
19	7	25 February 2023	8 April 2023	5.70
Behind the Screens		9 April 2023		5.34
20	7	24 February 2024	13 April 2024	5.08

== Merchandise ==
In 2004, Susan Presecot Games released a board game based on the series. In June 2016, another board game was released by Paul Lamond Games.

=== Ant & Dec's Takeaway on Tour ===
On 31 October 2013, showrunners announced a live tour of the show, under the title "Takeaway on Tour", which would be co-produced between Ant & Dec, James Grant Live, and ITV Studios. Presented by the show's hosts, with Kim Gavin as the tour's artistic director, it featured appearances by various celebrities and performers and a number of segments from the programme, including an appearance by Ashley Roberts (who also performed at the shows) as the host of the tour's version of "Ant vs. Dec".

Demand for tickets was high, leading to extra dates and venues being added on 28 November 2013, along with some shows having their dates rearranged. The tour ran for only one series of shows, between 6 August – 13 September 2014 across various cities in the United Kingdom and the Republic of Ireland, which were: London, Cardiff, Birmingham, Leeds, Manchester, Glasgow, Belfast, Sheffield, Newcastle, Nottingham, Liverpool and Dublin.

=== Home media ===
On 24 November 2003, a compilation VHS and DVD containing clips from the second series was released by Video Collection International and Granada Media. The DVD release also contained some bonus extras.

On 1 November 2004, another compilation VHS and DVD, titled "Home Delivery" was released by Granada Ventures, this time featuring clips from the third series. Bonus features on both formats include various interviews, a behind-the-scenes featurette, and a bonus clip of Jonathan Wilkes' interaction with the Ploppies.

Episodes from Series 18 to 20 are available on ITVX, as of Oct 2026.

== International versions ==
The success of Saturday Night Takeaway led to the creation of a number of international versions:

- A Finnish version of the programme, entitled Huuma (Ecstasy in English) was aired on MTV3. Premiering in March 2005, it ran for four years before it was axed in 2009. The show featured its own take on notable segments, such as "Little Ant & Dec" and "Win the Ads", and featured various hosts presenting it. It was revived by MTV3 on 14 September 2019, and ran for 10 episodes, ending on 16 November 2019.
- A Chinese version of the programme was launched on 11 January 2008. Entitled Friday Night Takeaway (快乐2008 in Chinese), it was broadcast on Hunan TV, and hosted by He Jiong and Ma Ke.
- Two German versions of the programme were created. The first version, made in 2005, was cancelled after just one episode was shown on Sat.1. The second version was launched on 29 August 2008, under the title Die Sonja & Dirk Show, and had better success. Created for RTL Television, it was hosted by Sonja Zietlow and Dirk Bach, both of whom were known for presenting the German version of I'm a Celebrity...Get Me Out of Here!, and featured a similar format to the British original in terms of segments. The programme ran for 4 years before it was axed, following the death of Bach on 1 October 2012.
- A Spanish version of the show, El supershow, was aired on Antena 3 in Summer 2004, presented by Carlos Sobera and Patricia Pérez. Starting on 21 July and lasting until late August, it was axed after one series despite getting good ratings.
- A Flemish version of the show, named Alles Moet Weg ("Everything has to go") was aired on the Belgian commercial channel VTM for one season. Hosted by Koen Wauters, the show ran for one season of six episodes, starting on 29 February 2008. It featured several segments copied from the British version like "the Jiggy Bank" and "versus" (here named "Koen Versus", where Koen would compete against a different Flemish celebrity each week.) and "Beat The Boys". The sixth and last episode aired on 4 April 2008.
- A Portuguese version named Sabadabadão was launched on 10 May 2014. Broadcast on SIC, and co-produced by FremantleMedia, it was hosted by Júlia Pinheiro and João Baião, and ran for only one series of twelve episodes before it was axed.
- An American version was initially planned with Ant & Dec being the host under the name Saturday Night Takeout. The programme was launched on 15 September 2015. Announced the previous year on 27 October 2014, it was entitled Best Time Ever with Neil Patrick Harris (referred to also as Best Time Ever), presented by Neil Patrick Harris, and produced by NBC as part of their Tuesday night entry for 2015–16 television season. The show ran for one season, ending on 3 November 2015, before it was announced on 15 December, later that year, that it had been cancelled.
- A French version of the programme was launched on 11 February 2015. Announced the previous month, it was entitled Tout peut arriver ("Anything Could Happen"), aired on M6, and hosted by Guillaume Pley and Jérôme Anthony. The show performed poorly in the ratings and was cancelled after airing three episodes, the third of which was aired on W9.
- In October 2015, Australian network Seven announced plans to create an Australian version of the British original, intended to be aired on Sundays under the title of Sunday Night Takeaway, though no further announcements were made by Seven following this, and their plans were later dropped amidst claims it was focusing efforts on another project. On 19 May 2018, Network Ten officially announced plans to create an Australian version, under the same proposed title, and to be hosted by Julia Morris and Chris Brown, both of whom host the Australian version of I'm a Celebrity...Get Me Out of Here!, later confirming that year on 9 September that the pair had been secured as hosts and that the show was intended to be broadcast in 2019. It was announced in early February that Chris & Julia's Sunday Night Takeaway would premiere on 24 February 2019.

Country	Title	Broadcaster(s)	Presenter(s)	Premiere	Finale
Australia	Chris & Julia's Sunday Night Takeaway	Network Ten	Julia Morris and Chris Brown	24 February 2019	14 April 2019
Belgium (Flanders)	Alles Moet Weg	VTM	Koen Wauters and Wendy Huyghe	29 February 2008	4 April 2008
China	Friday Night Takeaway 快乐2008	Hunan TV	He Jiong and Ma Ke	11 January 2008	2008
Finland	Huuma	MTV3	Lorenz Backman, Jaakko Saariluoma, Heikki Paasonen and Niina Herala; Roope Salminen, Ernest Lawson and Jenni Kokander	5 March 2005; 14 September 2019	21 March 2009; 16 November 2019
France	Tout peut arriver	M6; W9	Guillaume Pley and Jérôme Anthony	11 February 2015; 24 March 2015	18 February 2015; 24 March 2015
Germany	?	Sat. 1	?	2005	2005
Germany	Die Sonja & Dirk Show	RTL	Sonja Zietlow and Dirk Bach	29 August 2008	1 October 2012
Portugal	Sabadabadão	SIC	Júlia Pinheiro and João Baião	10 May 2014	2 August 2014
Spain	El supershow	Antena 3	Carlos Sobera and Patricia Pérez	21 July 2004	August 2004
United States	Best Time Ever with Neil Patrick Harris	NBC	Neil Patrick Harris with Nicole Scherzinger	15 September 2015	3 November 2015
