= The Paul Daniels Magic Show =

- 1994 titlecard
- Genre: Magic
- Starring: Paul Daniels; Debbie McGee
- Country of origin: United Kingdom
- Original language: English
- No. of series: 15; 1 (Paul Daniels Secrets)
- No. of episodes: 120 (series); 21 (specials); 5 (compilations); 8 (Secrets)

Production
- Running time: 60 mins

Original release
- Network: BBC1
- Release: 31 December 1977
- Release: 9 June 1979 – 18 June 1994

Related
- Paul Daniels Secrets

The Paul Daniels Magic Show is a British magic show presented by entertainer and magician Paul Daniels that aired on BBC1 from 9 June 1979 to 18 June 1994. Daniels' assistant throughout the series was Debbie McGee, whom he married in 1988. At its peak in the 1980s, the show regularly attracted viewing figures of 15 million and was sold to 43 countries.

== Transmissions ==
=== Original series ===
| Series | Start date | End date | Episodes |
|---|---|---|---|
| 1 | 9 June 1979 | 30 June 1979 | 4 |
| 2 | 13 September 1980 | 18 October 1980 | 6 |
| 3 | 26 September 1981 | 28 November 1981 | 6 |
| 4 | 2 October 1982 | 20 November 1982 | 8 |
| 5 | 15 October 1983 | 3 December 1983 | 8 |
| 6 | 1 September 1984 | 20 October 1984 | 8 |
| 7 | 7 September 1985 | 9 November 1985 | 10 |
| 8 | 6 December 1986 | 14 February 1987 | 10 |
| 9 | 2 January 1988 | 27 February 1988 | 9 |
| 10 | 7 January 1989 | 25 February 1989 | 8 |
| 11 | 6 January 1990 | 24 February 1990 | 8 |
| 12 | 5 January 1991 | 2 March 1991 | 9 |
| 13 | 11 January 1992 | 7 March 1992 | 9 |
| 14 | 2 January 1993 | 27 February 1993 | 9 |
| 15 | 2 April 1994 | 18 June 1994 | 9 |

=== Specials ===
| Date | Entitle |
|---|---|
| 31 December 1977 | (Special produced by Granada TV) |
| 22 December 1979 | Christmas Special |
| 25 December 1980 | The Paul Daniels Magic Christmas Show |
| 25 December 1981 | Paul Daniels Magical Christmas |
| 25 December 1982 | The Paul Daniels Magic Christmas Show |
| 26 December 1983 | The Paul Daniels Magic Christmas Show |
| 25 December 1984 | The Paul Daniels Magic Christmas Show |
| 6 April 1985 | The Paul Daniels Magic Easter Show |
| 26 December 1985 | The Paul Daniels Magic Christmas Show |
| 27 December 1986 | The Paul Daniels Magic Christmas Show |
| 31 October 1987 | Paul Daniels Live at Hallowe'en |
| 26 December 1987 | The Paul Daniels Magic Christmas Show |
| 31 October 1988 | Paul Daniels Live at Hallowe'en |
| 26 December 1988 | The Paul Daniels Magic Christmas Show |
| 26 December 1989 | The Paul Daniels Magic Show |
| 24 December 1990 | The Paul Daniels Magic Show Christmas Edition |
| 22 March 1991 | The First Ten Years |
| 28 December 1991 | The Paul Daniels Magic Show Festive Edition |
| 24 December 1992 | The Paul Daniels Magic Show Festive Edition |
| 28 December 1993 | The Paul Daniels Christmas Magic Show |

=== Compilations ===
| Date | Entitle |
|---|---|
| 12 April 1982 | The Best of Paul Daniels 1981 |
| 4 April 1983 | The Best of Paul Daniels 1982 |
| 3 April 1984 | The Best of Paul Daniels |
| 3 January 1985 | Paul Daniels Magic Moments - Best of Series 6 |
| 5 May 1986 | Paul Daniels Million Pound Magic - Best of Series 7 |

=== Paul Daniels Secrets ===
==== Special ====
| Date | Entitle |
|---|---|
| 29 December 1994 | Secrets Festive |

==== Series ====
| Series | Start date | End date | Episodes |
|---|---|---|---|
| 1 | 15 November 1995 | 17 January 1996 | 8 |
