= Paul Daniels =

English magician (1938–2016)

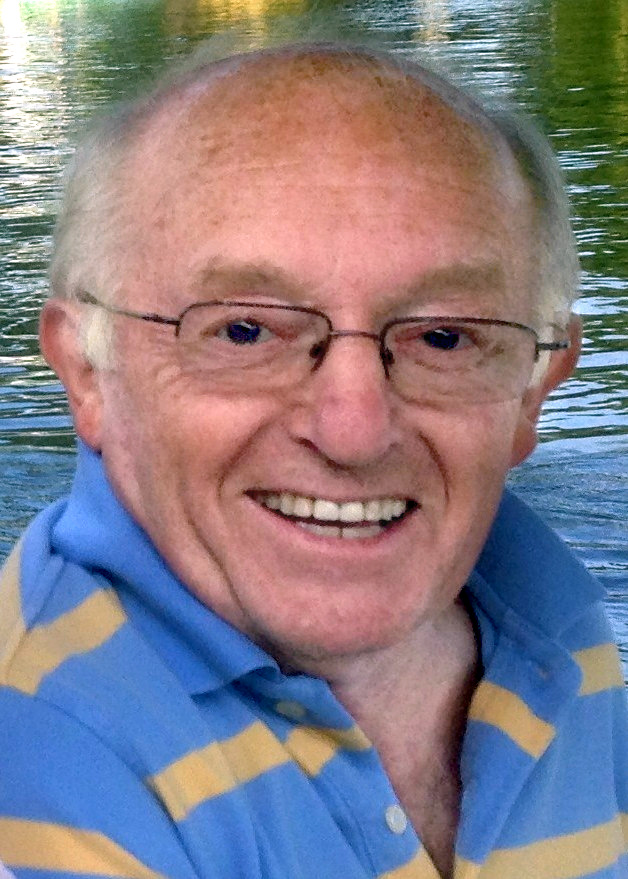
- Daniels in August 2013
- Born: Newton Edward Daniels; 6 April 1938; South Bank, England
- Died: 17 March 2016 (aged 77); Wargrave, England
- Occupations: Magician; television presenter
- Years active: 1969–2016
- Spouses: Jacqueline Skipworth (m. 1960; div. 1975) Debbie McGee (m. 1988)
- Children: 3, including Martin
- Website: www.pauldaniels.co.uk

Newton Edward Daniels (6 April 1938 – 17 March 2016), known professionally as Paul Daniels, was an English magician and television presenter. He achieved international fame through his television series The Paul Daniels Magic Show, which ran on the BBC from 1979 to 1994.

Daniels was known for his catchphrase "You'll like this... not a lot, but you'll like it!", and for his marriage to his assistant, Debbie McGee. He was awarded the "Magician of the Year" Award by the Academy of Magical Arts in 1982, the first magician from outside the United States to receive it. He also won the Golden Rose of Montreux in 1985. He was a Member of the Inner Magic Circle with Gold Star. He has been described as "The Godfather of Magic" and has been repeatedly credited with inspiring many top magicians to start in the profession.

Daniels was outspoken on matters including politics, current affairs, magic, entertainment, and fellow celebrities. Towards the end of his life he also appeared in reality television shows.

== Early life ==
Daniels was born on 6 April 1938 in the South Bank area of Middlesbrough, the son of Handel Newton "Hughie" Daniels and Nancy (née Lloyd). He was of Welsh descent. His father was a cinema projectionist at the Hippodrome Theatre and a worker for ICI in Wilton, North Riding of Yorkshire. After completing his education at Sir William Turner's Grammar School on Coatham Road in Coatham, North Riding of Yorkshire and holding his first job as a junior clerk in the treasurer's office of Eston Council, Daniels served as a conscript in the 1st Battalion, Green Howards, during his national service. He was posted to the British garrison in Hong Kong before training as an accountant in local government.

Even in his early age, Daniels had thinning hair, which he claimed to be an act of "magic". He later sported a wig for much of his television career. After working as a junior clerk and then as an auditor in local government, he joined his parents in their grocery business. He later set up his own shop, at one point a mobile shop, but eventually gave this up in favour of his growing career as a magician.

In 2012, Daniels explained the origin of his stage name to The Guardian, saying: "I borrowed the name Paul from my first son, who was born in 1960. I was born Newton Edward Daniels, everyone called me Ted, but Paul worked better for showbusiness".

== Showbusiness career ==
Daniels' interest in magic began at the age of 11 when, during a holiday, he read a book called How to Entertain at Parties. He began performing magic as a hobby, occasionally entertaining at parties and youth clubs and later doing shows for fellow servicemen during his national service. After returning to civilian life he continued to develop his magic by performing in clubs in the evenings while working at his grocery business during the day. Paul was a member of the Middlesbrough Circle of Magicians where he developed an act with his first wife Jackie under the name of "The Eldani's", an anagram of Daniels. It was while working the clubs that he developed what would become his long-running catchphrase, "You'll like this ... not a lot, but you'll like it." He stated that he first came up with the line at a club in Bradford as a way to deal with a heckler.

A major turning point in Daniels' career came in 1969 when he was offered a summer season in Newquay in Cornwall. He decided to sell his grocery business and try magic as a full-time career. He made his television debut on the long-running talent show Opportunity Knocks in 1970, and came second. Television producer Johnnie Hamp saw Daniels in that show and later gave him a regular spot on a show compèred by Bernard Manning, The Wheeltappers and Shunters Social Club, for Granada Television.

In 1978, ITV gave Daniels his own Sunday night show, Paul Daniels' Blackpool Bonanza. His first series for the BBC was For My Next Trick, where Daniels appeared with several other magicians and singer Faith Brown. This led to Daniels presenting his own television series, The Paul Daniels Magic Show, on BBC1 from 1979 until 1994. As well as featuring tricks and illusions for pure entertainment, he also included a regular segment (the "Bunco Booth") in which he exposed the confidence tricks of street charlatans. He also replicated the kind of results that have impressed researchers of the paranormal and parapsychologists in a segment called Under Laboratory Conditions, thereby demonstrating his scepticism about claims made in these fields.

Daniels starred in his own stage show, It's Magic, at the Prince of Wales Theatre from 10 December 1980 until 6 February 1982. At that time, the show was one of the longest-running magic shows ever staged in London. By this point he was already working with his future wife, Debbie McGee, whose role as his assistant would become a major feature of his act. She had first worked with him on his summer season show in Great Yarmouth in 1979.

In addition to his magic shows he hosted other television series during the 1980s and 1990s, including three BBC1 quiz shows: Odd One Out, Every Second Counts and Wipeout (all of which were based on short-lived American game shows), and the children's television programme Wizbit (also for the BBC), about a magician called Wizbit and a rabbit called Woolly, who lived in Puzzleopolis. In 1987, he was a timekeeper in the charity television special The Grand Knockout Tournament.

Also in 1987, Daniels hosted a controversial Halloween live special of his magic show where he replicated a Harry Houdini escape from an iron maiden. The trick was deliberately staged to give the illusion that the escape had gone tragically wrong and Daniels had been killed – it was later broadcast that he had successfully escaped from the device.

He was the subject of This Is Your Life in 1988 when he was surprised by Michael Aspel.

Daniels and McGee were the focus of one of the episodes of the 2001 BBC documentary series When Louis Met..., presented by Louis Theroux, with Daniels additionally appearing on Da Ali G Show in an Ali G costume, and was interviewed by Caroline Aherne in her guise as Mrs Merton. In 2004, Daniels and McGee appeared in the Channel 5 reality TV show, The Farm, and in 2006, they appeared in the ITV show The X Factor: Battle of the Stars. They were the first act voted off the show, after singing "Let Me Entertain You" by Robbie Williams. Daniels and McGee also made a guest appearance in the Wife Swap series in early 2007, with McGee changing places with journalist and presenter Vanessa Feltz.

In 2007 Daniels announced they were working on a return of the once successful tv show Wizbit, they started with a small release of a book series to drum up interest ahead of a Television pilot, with episodes produced by HandE Productions. This was with a brand new cast and had bigger plans to be made into a movie in 2010. However during the recession, this revival was cancelled.

In 2010, he competed in Strictly Come Dancing with his partner Ola Jordan. They were consistently criticised by the judges and were the second couple to leave the competition.

In August 2011, while filming a scene for ITV's Sooty, Daniels was struck by a flying pizza, thrown by the puppet Sooty. He got a piece of pizza in his eye and called in to a cottage hospital for them to rinse it out. Later that month he appeared with his son, Martin, on episode 9 of the first season of Penn & Teller: Fool Us.

On 10 October 2012, Daniels and McGee appeared on All Star Mr & Mrs on ITV.

In 2008 and 2010, Daniels toured with 'The Best of British Variety Tour', with acts including Cannon and Ball, Christopher Biggins, Frank Carson and The Krankies, where he closed the first half of the show.

In 2013, Daniels and Debbie McGee toured their 'First Farewell Tour', followed by a tour 'comically' entitled 'Back Despite Popular Demand Tour' a year later. They toured 'The Intimate Tour' in 2015 and starred in the pantomime Aladdin at the Regent Theatre, Ipswich from December 2015 until January 2016, completing the run a few days before Daniels was taken ill.

== Awards ==
Daniels was awarded the Zina Bennett trophy from the British Ring of the International Brotherhood of Magicians in 1964, while he was known as Ted Daniels.

Daniels was awarded the Magician of the Year award by the Academy of Magical Arts in 1982, becoming the first magician from outside the US to receive it. An Easter special of The Paul Daniels Magic Show won the Golden Rose of Montreux Award at the International TV Festival in Switzerland in 1985.

Daniels was the recipient of the Maskelyne, awarded for services to British magic by The Magic Circle in 1988.

Daniels was awarded the Devant for services to International Magic by the Magic Circle in 2007, and the Carlton Comedy Award was bestowed upon him in 2012 by the same organization.

Daniels was also given the Great Lafayette Award by the Edinburgh International Magic Festival in 2011.

== Politics and other views ==
Daniels was a supporter of the Conservative Party. He was reported to have considered leaving the UK with the election of a Labour Party government at the 1997 general election. Daniels later said that his views had been misrepresented, and he would only have considered leaving if they raised income tax. Daniels stated that he had limited sympathy with the homeless because he had come from a "very poor" background and "grafted" to achieve his success. In 2011, he tweeted that he did not consider the term "Paki" to be any more offensive than the word "Brit", and described those who held the opposite view as being excessively politically correct.

Daniels was personally affected by the winter storms of 2013–2014 and described himself in an interview for Channel 4 News as a climate change sceptic, instead attributing flooding to changes in procedures of The Environment Agency, particularly with regard to dredging. He supported the hereditary system in the House of Lords, expressing the view that the aristocracy had "genetic knowledge" that others lacked. On the subject of criminal justice, he once publicly offered to help murderer Ian Huntley end his own life.

Daniels refused to attend magic conferences in the UK since they "...were ruined for me by bitchiness and jealousy...now I only go to foreign conventions where, to be honest, I am greeted with respect and civility AND I have tons of 'foreign' magician friends." He was dismissive of modern illusionists, once describing David Blaine as "not very original". He commented on other television personalities such as Anne Robinson and Chris Morris, saying that Robinson had hated him ever since his 1987 Halloween special hoax performance, while describing Morris as "just nasty." He was dismissive of the younger generation of impressionists, saying: "Forget Alistair McGowan. There's been no-one good since Mike Yarwood." Daniels was also critical of journalists, stating "I don't really understand why journalism has to be so nasty, so sarcastic and intrusive".

Following the Jimmy Savile sexual abuse scandal in 2012, Daniels said that while he believed his fellow BBC broadcaster Jimmy Savile was "undoubtedly a bad guy", he questioned whether some accusers were "for real". His comments were criticised by the NSPCC, and Mark Williams-Thomas, the former child protection officer who had presented the documentary that first aired the allegations against Savile, accused Daniels of "belittling" Savile's victims in one of his blog posts. The entry was later removed from Daniels's blog.

Daniels was an atheist.

== Personal life ==
Daniels married his first wife, Jacqueline Skipworth (born 1942), in 1960; she was 17 and he was 21. They had three sons together: Gary, Paul, and magician Martin. All three sons occasionally appeared on The Paul Daniels Magic Show in varying capacities. Daniels's father often made props for the show, such as wooden boxes for the Selbit Sawing illusion, whilst his mother sewed the stage curtains for his theatre tours.

Daniels married his second wife, long-time assistant Debbie McGee, on 2 April 1988 in Buckinghamshire. The couple met in London in May 1979 during rehearsals for Daniels's summer season show in Great Yarmouth that year. McGee went on to work with Daniels in his 1980 summer show in Bournemouth and then his London stage show It's Magic before being offered the role of assistant in his long-running television series. Their relationship gradually became more established, and he proposed in 1987. When they married, he was 50 and she was 29. Early in their marriage, they lived in a house in Denham that once belonged to Roger Moore. In 1998, they moved to a house on the banks of the River Thames in Wargrave, Berkshire.

Daniels' 2000 autobiography, Under No Illusion, includes descriptions of his and McGee's sex life: "I was writing and needed to concentrate, so I had a 'Do Not Disturb' sign on my back. Eventually I went to bed and Debbie was lying stark naked on the bed – eat your heart out fellas! She was wearing the sort of sleeping blindfold you get on long-haul flights. Printed on it was 'Do Not Disturb'. But further down her body she had a sign that said 'Disturb'!" Daniels also wrote in the book that he had had sex with more than 300 women. He said that he had a "passionate" encounter with a schoolgirl hitch-hiker in 1969 when he was aged 30, though he ejected her from the car upon realising her age.

Daniels maintained a website that included personal information, a detailed blog, and podcasts.

In 2012, Daniels cut off his left index finger and the tip of his ring finger in an accident with a circular saw, in the garden shed of his Wargrave home. He drove himself from his home to hospital in Henley-on-Thames, where the index finger was reattached.

== Health problems and death ==
On 20 February 2016, Daniels had a fall and was taken to hospital, where he was treated by medical staff for suspected pernicious anemia. It was later discovered that he had an incurable brain tumour. He died less than a month later, on 17 March, at the age of 77, at his home in Wargrave.
