= 1986 in British television =

This is a list of British television related events from 1986.

== Events ==
=== January ===
- 1 January
  - New Year's Day highlights on BBC1 include a Paul Young concert simulcast with BBC Radio 1.
  - The network television premieres of the 1981 fantasy film Clash of the Titans and the 1979 Sylvester Stallone sequel Rocky II on BBC1.
- 2 January – A special edition of Tomorrow's World travels back a century to discover the latest developments in science and technology from 1886.
- 4 January – Televised football returns to British television after the contractual dispute from the previous year is resolved.
- 6 January
  - Debut of the children's animated series and second programme in the trilogy to be produced by Maddocks Cartoon Productions, Jimbo and the Jet-Set on BBC1, while Children's ITV premieres Telebugs.
  - A regional news bulletin is broadcast after the Nine O'Clock News for the first time. It had originally been planned to appear the previous September to coincide with last year's relaunch of the Nine O'Clock News.
- 8 January – BBC1 begins showing the popular culture and video game themed quiz show First Class. Hosted by Debbie Greenwood it is notable for competitors playing the Atari arcade game Paperboy.
- 9 January
  - Rowan Atkinson returns as Edmund Blackadder in the BBC1 comedy series Blackadder II, moving forward in time to the Elizabethan era. It also features Tony Robinson, Tim McInnerny, Stephen Fry (Lord Melchett) and Miranda Richardson ("Queenie").
  - BBC2 launches the follow-up series to the acclaimed political satire Yes Minister with Yes, Prime Minister.
- 10 January – Debut of the comedy-drama mystery series Lovejoy on BBC1, starring Ian McShane as the titular roguish antiques dealer, based on the novels by Jonathan Gash and adapted for television by Ian La Frenais. Despite being a moderate rating success it is not brought back until 6 January 1991, following a five-year gap between the first and second series.
- 12 January – Debut of the high-tech game show Catchphrase on ITV, presented by Roy Walker.
- 14 January – Debut of the private detective series Boon on ITV, starring Michael Elphick.
- 17 January – Central Weekend begins broadcasting in ITV's Central region hosted by Sue Jay, Andy Craig and Roger Cook, while BBC1 airs a feature-length episode of US soap Dynasty that sets up the storyline ready for the spin-off series Dynasty II: The Colbys which begins on 24 January.
- 19 January – Debut of the Screen Two film The Silent Twins, a drama based on the true story of June and Jennifer Gibbons, identical twin sisters known as the "Silent Twins" because they refuse to speak to anyone but each other.
- 21 January – Debut of children's wildlife magazine programme The Really Wild Show on BBC1.
- 24 January – The US soap Dynasty II: The Colbys makes its UK debut on BBC1.
- 25 January
  - Channel 4 begins showing the first full series of the comedy and music show Saturday Live, with regular appearances by Ben Elton, Harry Enfield, Stephen Fry, Hugh Laurie, Chris Barrie, Craig Ferguson and Julian Clary.
  - Channel 4 broadcasts the Super Bowl XX live from the Louisiana Superdome.
- 28 January – NASA's Space Shuttle Challenger spacecraft disintegrates. BBC1 breaks the news during Newsround, while ITV interrupts the live broadcast of Splash, and Channel 4 make their news reports after both Countdown and the American sitcom Bewitched. BBC1 hands over the news coverage over to BBC2 once Newsround has ended, in order to air both Grange Hill and Fax!. The latter channel then broadcasts a special edition of Newsnight (dropping both Fast Forward and The Adventure Game, with No Limits being spared, due to the programme being broadcast at 6pm, against the news on BBC1). ITV later makes a news update before the third episode of Boon.
- 31 January – Channel 4 begins showing Season 4 of the US comedy series Cheers, which introduces Woody Harrelson to the long running show.

=== February ===
- 4 February – Thorn EMI sells its stake in Swindon Cable to British Telecom and the new owners axe Focus on Swindon and other local programming and replaces it with bought-in content.
- 8 February – The game show Every Second Counts makes its debut on BBC1, presented by Paul Daniels.
- 19 February – BBC1 airs Round Britain Whizz, an edition of the science documentary series Q.E.D. The 30-minute programme consists of a sped up flight around the coastline of Great Britain with guest appearances from geologists and TV personalities including Patrick Moore, David Bellamy and Terry Wogan telling the viewer about the geology and natural history of certain areas.
- 26 February – Channel 4 airs its first terrestrial television showing of Terry Gilliam's 1981 British fantasy adventure Time Bandits, starring Sean Connery, John Cleese, Shelley Duvall, Ralph Richardson, Ian Holm, Michael Palin and David Warner.
- February – For the first time in the UK, animated graphics are seen during teletext transmissions. They are broadcast on Channel 4. This is made possible by transmitting 4-Tel On View from a disc rather than live.

=== March ===
- 4 March – Channel 4 screens the network premiere of John Boorman's 1981 King Arthur fantasy film Excalibur, starring Nigel Terry, Nicol Williamson and Helen Mirren.
- 5 March – Two months after the BBC finally resolved a deal with Lorimar Television distributors Worldvision Enterprises, a year after Thames bought the UK rights for ITV before handing it back to the BBC, BBC1 finally starts airing season 9 of the US drama series Dallas beginning with a feature-length episode. This season is often referred to as the so-called "Dream Year" of the character Pam Ewing.
- 10 March
  - The first advert for a sanitary towel is broadcast on British television on Channel 4.
  - James the Cat, created by Kate Canning and narrated by Bergerac actor Sean Arnold, makes its debut on Children's ITV – although closing credits indicate it was produced in 1984. James the Cat had previously appeared in Canning's Flower Stories in 1975.
- 23 March – The television play Shergar, telling the story of the theft of the racehorse Shergar, is aired as part of BBC2's Screen Two anthology series. The film stars Stephen Rea and Gary Waldhorn.
- 26 March – Debut of the SuperTed public information film designed to teach children road safety.
- 27 March – Following the launch the previous Autumn of in-vision continuity for children's programmes on the BBC, for the first time, in-vision presentation is introduced to holiday weekday morning children's programmes. The Easter period's ten programmes are presented by Roland Rat and are called Roland Rat's Easter Extravaganza.
- 30 March – BBC 2 airs its twin-striped 2 ident for the final time between 5.45 and 9.10 pm. The TWO ident makes its debut between 7.15 and 10 pm and is used until 16 February 1991.
- 31 March – The network television premiere of the 1982 romantic drama An Officer and a Gentleman on ITV, starring Richard Gere and Debra Winger.

=== April ===
- 1 April
  - All commercial activities of the BBC are now handled by BBC Enterprises Ltd.
  - As part of the BBC's Drugwatch campaign, BBC1 airs It's Not Just Zammo, a Newsround special presented by John Craven and Nick Ross that seeks to warn younger viewers about the dangers of using drugs. The programme follows a recent drug abuse storyline in Grange Hill involving the character Zammo McGuire (Lee MacDonald) and features the launch of a version of the anti-drugs song "Just Say No", recorded by members of the Grange Hill cast. The song goes on to reach the top ten of the UK Singles Chart while members of the cast are invited to the White House to meet First Lady Nancy Reagan who founded the Just Say No campaign.
- 2 April – The first in-vision teletext service is seen on ITV when Central launches its Jobfinder service. It broadcasts for one hour after the end of the day's programming. Many other regions launch their own Jobfinder service later in the 1980s.
- 3 April
  - The children's animated series The Raggy Dolls makes its debut on ITV, narrated by Neil Innes.
  - BBC1's Top of the Pops introduces its new theme tune "The Wizard" by Paul Hardcastle, which will be used until 1991.
- 5 April – ITV begins showing the final series of Robin of Sherwood, with Jason Connery starring as a new Robin Hood.
- 8 April – Miami Vice returns to BBC1 for its second season with the episode Phil the Shill, starring the singer Phil Collins. However, the majority of the episodes are shown out of order on the BBC with the feature-length opening season episode not broadcast until July 1987.
- 11 April – The music show The Chart Show makes its debut on Channel 4.
- 12 April – The network television premiere of John Carpenter's 1982 science-fiction horror remake film The Thing on ITV, starring Kurt Russell, Wilford Brimley, Keith David, T. K. Carter and Richard Dysart.
- 17 April – Last edition of the snooker series Pot Black as a peak time series on BBC2 which was won by Jimmy White. The series was axed due to more snooker tournaments filling the season calendar and by then snooker was one of the most watched sports in the UK. It will return five years later as a daytime series.
- 20 April – The game between Hearts and Aberdeen is the first football league match in Scotland to be televised live, broadcast by Scottish Television.
- 25 April – BBC1 shows the very first Comic Relief. Pre-recorded at the Shaftesbury Theatre in London, it features comedians such as Lenny Henry, Rowan Atkinson and Billy Connolly, with music from Kate Bush as well as Cliff Richard, appearing alongside the cast of The Young Ones.
- April – Ahead of the launch of Super Channel, negotiations which result in the merger of Super Channel and Music Channel Ltd begin. This will result in Music Box moving from being a stand-alone channel to being a segment within Super Channel when it launches next year.

=== May ===
- 1 May
  - The sitcom Bread makes its debut on BBC1.
  - Tim Roth stars in a new four–part drama miniseries King of the Ghetto on BBC2.
- 3 May – The Saturday morning children's series Get Fresh makes its debut on ITV, presented by Gareth Jones.
- 8 May – Television and radio broadcasts coverage of the local elections for the first time. The BBC airs coverage until around 2.30am. ITV's coverage is not a networked ITN special but is instead produced by individual companies.
- 9 May – BBC1 airs "Video Jukebox", a special extended edition of its Omnibus arts programme telling the story of the music video. It is presented by John Peel and John Walters.
- 11 May – Spitting Image's "The Chicken Song" reaches No. 1 in the UK Singles Chart, holding the position for three weeks.
- 14 May – The network television premiere of the 1982 science-fiction sequel Star Trek II: The Wrath of Khan on ITV, starring William Shatner, Leonard Nimoy, DeForest Kelley and Ricardo Montalbán.
- 21 May – Debut of A Very Peculiar Practice on BBC2.
- 23 May – The final edition of Pebble Mill at One is broadcast on BBC1 after 14 years on the air. It ends ahead of the launch in the Autumn of a full daytime service on BBC1 which will see it being replaced by a new lunchtime news bulletin, the One O'Clock News. The series would return in 1991.
- 24 May – ITV London shows the network premiere of John Landis' 1980 musical comedy film The Blues Brothers, starring John Belushi and Dan Aykroyd. It is later shown on Central on 5 July and Granada on 7 November.
- 26 May – The hit US comedy series Moonlighting makes its UK debut on BBC1, starring Bruce Willis and Cybill Shepherd. It begins with the feature-length pilot and the rest of the series is shown on BBC2 from 29 May.
- 31 May–29 June – The BBC and ITV provide coverage of the 1986 FIFA World Cup.
- May – Ealing Cable launches Indra Dhnush, a subscription-based Asian service devoted to Hindi films and television programmes with some material in other Indian languages for 16 hours a day.

=== June ===
- 3 June – BBC1 airs a three-part dramatisation of the Jeffrey Archer novel Kane and Abel. Part Two is shown on 5 June and Part Three on 6 June.
- 5 June – The network television premiere of Ridley Scott's 1982 cult science-fiction thriller Blade Runner on ITV, starring Harrison Ford, Sean Young, Rutger Hauer, Daryl Hannah and Edward James Olmos.
- 6 June – The first Parliamentary review programme is broadcast when the first edition of The Lords This Week is shown at 11:40pm on BBC2.
- 8 June – Brian Walden presents his final edition of LWT's political programme Weekend World after nine years in the role.
- 15 June – Singer Helen Shapiro joins Granada's Albion Market as hairdresser Viv Harker.
- 18 June – In Coronation Street, the Rovers Return pub is gutted by a fire with landlady Bet Lynch (Julie Goodyear) trapped inside.
- 25 June – The final episode of The Adventures of Portland Bill airs on Children's ITV.
- 26 June – The long-running science-fiction series Doctor Who goes on the air in The Bahamas on ZNS-TV.
- 28 June – The final episode of Robin of Sherwood airs on ITV.

=== July ===
- 5 July – ITV begins showing the Disney and HTV produced adventure series, Return to Treasure Island, starring Brian Blessed as Long John Silver.
- 18 July – The Crystal Palace transmitter becomes the first in the world to transmit stereophonic sound using the NICAM digital sound system when it broadcasts the BBC's coverage of the First Night of the Proms in stereo.
- 23 July
  - In London, Prince Andrew, Duke of York marries Sarah Ferguson at Westminster Abbey. Both BBC1 and ITV broadcasts the wedding from 6.15am to 1.30pm and the couple's honeymoon departure (BBC1 from 3.30 to 4.20pm and ITV from 4 to 5pm) and documentaries, with ITV airing them from 6.45 to 7.30pm, and at 12.40pm, while BBC1 show their documentary from 9.30 to 10.30pm.
  - BBC1 airs a live edition of Top of the Pops, presented by Gary Davies and Peter Powell.
- 24 July – BBC1 airs the opening ceremony from the 1986 Commonwealth Games in Edinburgh which includes a 45-minute display produced by the BBC that celebrates the Spirit of Youth.
- 24 July–2 August – The BBC airs the 1986 Commonwealth Games and for the first time they are shown live and in full with around ten hours of live coverage each day.
- 27 July – London Weekend Television begins screening half hour compilations of Telebugs on Sunday afternoons. A couple of other ITV regions will later adopt this practice as TVS and Channel Television screen these special compilations on Wednesday mornings, followed by Anglia, Central and Grampian on Saturday mornings.
- 28 July–29 August – Children's BBC switches to the traditional morning Summer block of programmes. Included is a series of special Newsround programmes called Newsround Special Edition, which tours the UK with the Radio 1 Roadshow.
- 31 July – Debut of the long-running science series Equinox on Channel 4.

=== August ===
- 1 August – The US sitcom The Golden Girls makes its UK debut on Channel 4.
- 4–29 August – Due to Children's BBC moving to mornings, the afternoon children's slot is dropped for this period. Much of the slot is replaced with a reshowing of Fame.
- 5 August
  - Michael Cashman makes his EastEnders debut as Colin Russell, the soap's first gay character.
  - The police procedural series The Bill makes its Australian television debut on ABC.
- 9 August – The Yorkshire ITV region becomes the first UK terrestrial channel to broadcast 24 hours a day, simulcasting the cable and satellite music video channel Music Box throughout the night. The other ITV regions gradually switch to 24-hour television over the next two years.
- 16 August – The FA Charity Shield is shown live in its entirety for the first time when ITV provides coverage of the match involving Everton and Liverpool.
- 21 August – Channel 4 announces the introduction of its red triangle to "indicate certain late-night feature films for which special discretion may be required".
- 24 August – Granada's "continuing drama series" Albion Market airs its 100th and final episode. The show is cancelled after less than a year on air due to poor ratings and negative reviews.
- 26 August – In Emmerdale Farm, original character Pat Sugden dies after rolling her car down a hillside to avoid a flock of sheep.
- 29 August – After 16 years, London Weekend Television drops its river-based logo and launches a new ident.
- 30 August – BBC1 begins a run of films making their debut on British television, under the banner of Saturday Night at the Movies. The first in the run is Harold Becker's 1981 drama Taps, starring Timothy Hutton, Sean Penn and Tom Cruise.
- 31 August
  - Debut of Alan Bleasdale's four-part World War I drama The Monocled Mutineer on BBC1, starring Paul McGann. The series causes some controversy when some right-wing newspapers cite it as an example of what they believe to be a left-wing bias of the BBC.
  - The network television premiere of the 1981 James Bond film For Your Eyes Only on ITV, starring Roger Moore.
- August – "Anyone Can Fall in Love", a song performed by EastEnders actress Anita Dobson (Angie Watts), which gives words to the soap's theme tune, is released as a single and peaks at number 4 on the UK Singles Chart.

=== September ===
- 1 September – The sitcom Brush Strokes makes its debut on BBC1.
- 2 September – Ahead of the launch of all-day television on BBC1, the weekly magazine programme for Asian women, Gharbar, transfers back to BBC2. It moves to a new day and new slot, 9am on Tuesdays.
- 6 September
  - Part One of The Trial of a Time Lord is broadcast on BBC1, marking the return of Doctor Who after a 17-month hiatus.
  - Debut of the long-running medical drama Casualty on BBC1. Although an immediate success with viewers, the show attracts controversy because of its portrayal of an under-funded National Health Service, which is seen as a criticism of Margaret Thatcher's government.
  - The network television premiere of Stanley Donen's 1980 science-fiction thriller Saturn 3 on BBC1.
- 9 September – The last ever non-stop all-day BBC2 Ceefax transmission takes place.
- 13 September – The network television premiere of the 1983 horror film sequel Psycho II on ITV, with Anthony Perkins reprising his role as Norman Bates.
- 14 September – Matthew Parris succeeds Brian Walden as presenter of Weekend World.
- 15 September – BBC1 screens the network television premiere of the 1982 action film First Blood, starring Sylvester Stallone as Vietnam War veteran John Rambo.
- 19 September
  - Central revives New Faces. Styled as New Faces of '86, it is presented by Marti Caine, a winner from the previous version.
  - From this day, Channel 4 shows a red triangle at the start of and during films with adult themes. The first use of the warning is for the film Themroc, aired at 11:30pm. After lobbying from newspapers and pressure groups, this method of identifying such material is phased out within a year.
- 20 September – The network television premiere of Gordon Carroll's helicopter action thriller Blue Thunder on BBC1, shown censored with profanities redubbed for television.
- 20–21 September – For the third and final time, BBC2 goes Rock Around the Clock.
- 24 September – The children's series Thomas the Tank Engine and Friends returns for its second series on ITV with Ringo Starr returning as the narrator. The upcoming episodes will also introduce new characters including Trevor, Bill and Ben, Donald and Douglas, Daisy, Diesel, Duck, Boco and Harold.
- 27 September – The network television premiere of Jay Sandrich's adventure Seems Like Old Times on BBC1.

=== October ===
- 4 October – The network television premiere of Dick Lowry's adventure film Wet Gold on BBC1.
- 6 October – Debut of the children's animated series The Trap Door on ITV, featuring the rotund blue creature "Berk" voiced by Willie Rushton.
- 8 October – The award-winning series The Life and Loves of a She-Devil is shown on BBC2.
- 11 October – The network television premiere of Roger Spottiswoode's crime thriller The Pursuit of D. B. Cooper on BBC1.
- 12 October – "Every Loser Wins", performed by the actor Nick Berry, begins a three-week run at the top of the UK Singles Chart after featuring in recent episodes of EastEnders. The song is an instant hit upon its release and goes on to win its writers an Ivor Novello Award.
- 13 October – Debut of the popular and long-running fashion series The Clothes Show on BBC1, hosted by the designer Jeff Banks.
- 14 October – Ahead of the forthcoming launch of a full daytime service, BBC2 begins regular late afternoon programming by showing a film during the second half of the gap between the end of Daytime on Two and the start of the evening's programmes.
- 16 October – The first two-hander episode of EastEnders, featuring Den and Angie Watts (Leslie Grantham and Anita Dobson), is broadcast on BBC1. The episode, in which Angie tells Den she has six months to live after he tells her he wants a divorce, is an experiment as the two-hander format has not been tried in a British soap before, but is well received by viewers and critics.
- 17 October – BBC2 broadcasts a teatime news summary with subtitles for the last time. For the past three years this bulletin which had been broadcast at around 5:25pm, had been the first programme of the day (apart from educational programmes and sports coverage).
- 18 October
  - Channel 4 starts weekend morning broadcasting with weekend transmissions now beginning at around 9:25am. Programming had previously started at 1pm.
  - The network television premiere of Peter Weir's 1983 romantic drama The Year of Living Dangerously, starring Mel Gibson and Sigourney Weaver on BBC1.
- 20 October – Following considerable criticism, including from the Independent Broadcasting Authority, Scottish Television reverses its 1984 changes to Scotland Today and the programme once again becomes a news broadcast with the feature elements transferred to a new lunchtime programme called Live at One Thirty.
- 22 October – BBC1 starts airing season 10 of the US drama series Dallas beginning with a feature-length episode.
- 24 October
  - Ahead of the launch of the BBC's daytime television service, Pages from Ceefax is shown during the day on BBC1 for the final time.
  - News After Noon is broadcast for the final time. The bulletin is replaced by a revamped lunchtime news programme One O'clock News.
  - The weekday mid-afternoon regional news summary is broadcast on BBC1 for the final time. From Monday, it is broadcast on BBC2.
- 27 October
  - BBC1 starts a full daytime television service. Before this day, excluding special events coverage, BBC Television has closed down at times during weekday mornings and afternoons, broadcasting trade test transmissions and, from May 1983, Pages From Ceefax. BBC Two also expands its broadcasting hours, providing a full afternoon service for the first time but it is not until the end of the decade that BBC Two is on air all day every day.
  - As part of the new service, the Australian soap Neighbours makes its UK debut on BBC1, a year after it first aired in its homeland. It is shown twice daily, at 1:25pm and a repeat of the previous episode at 10am.
- 29 October
  - Debut of the hugely popular game show Strike It Lucky on ITV, presented by Michael Barrymore.
  - The US crime drama series The Equalizer makes its UK debut on ITV, starring Edward Woodward.
- 31 October – BBC1 screens the 1982 John Carpenter-produced horror film Halloween III: Season of the Witch.

=== November ===
- 1 November – ITV shows the children's fantasy television movie The Worst Witch, starring Tim Curry and Diana Rigg.
- 2 November – To mark the 50th anniversary of the start of television broadcasting, TV50, in which BBC2's entire evening output for the next week is used to show programmes from the BBC's archives.
- 10 November – Breakfast Time is relaunched with a more formal news and current affairs format.
- 13 November – Self-employed hod-carrier Michael Lush is killed during his first rehearsal for a live stunt planned for BBC1's The Late, Late Breakfast Show. The stunt, called "Hang 'em High", involves bungee jumping from an exploding box suspended from a 120 ft-high crane. The carabiner clip attaching his bungee rope to the crane springs loose from its eyebolt during the jump and he dies instantly of multiple injuries. The 15 November edition is cancelled after presenter Noel Edmonds resigns, saying he does not "have the heart to carry on".
- 15 November – The network television premiere of Michael Crichton's science fiction crime drama Looker on BBC1.
- 16 November – Dennis Potter's critically acclaimed serial The Singing Detective makes its debut on BBC1, starring Michael Gambon and Joanne Whalley.
- 22 November – Debut of the practical jokes series Beadle's About on ITV, presented by Jeremy Beadle.
- 23 November – Channel 4 airs the speculative film The Trial of Lee Harvey Oswald.

=== December ===
- 6 December
  - Doctor Who concludes its The Trial of a Time Lord story-arc with part 2 of The Ultimate Foe. This marks the final appearance of Colin Baker as the Sixth Doctor before he is abruptly fired from the role.
  - The network television premiere of Jack Smight's romantic comedy Loving Couples on BBC1.
- 7 December – Jack Rosenthal's original two-hour TV movie of London's Burning, directed by Les Blair, is broadcast on ITV. It returns for a full series in February 1988.
- 8 December
  - Six weeks after launching its daytime service, the BBC starts broadcasting hourly news summaries. Morning bulletins are shown on BBC1 and early afternoon bulletins (at 2pm, 3pm and 3:50pm) are shown on BBC2. Each bulletin is followed by a weather forecast.
  - ITV begins airing the US Civil War miniseries North and South, starring Patrick Swayze and Lesley-Anne Down.
  - British Gas shares are floated on the Stock Exchange. To encourage individuals to become shareholders, the offer has been intensively advertised with the "If you see Sid...Tell him!" campaign.
- 11 December – The IBA announces that BSB has been awarded a fifteen-year franchise to operate a satellite television service in the UK.
- 13 December
  - Comedian Duggie Small wins New Faces of '86.
  - The network television premiere of Don Coscarelli's 1982 fantasy adventure The Beastmaster on BBC1.
- 15 December – Channel 4 airs Soap Aid in which cast members of Coronation Street and Brookside raise funds to help those affected by the famine in Ethiopia.
- 17 December – Ringo Starr narrates his last ever Thomas the Tank Engine and Friends episode with the second series finale, Thomas & the Missing Christmas Tree, on ITV.
- 20 December – ITV shows the network premiere of the 1983 comedy movie Trading Places, starring Dan Aykroyd and Eddie Murphy.
- 25 December
  - Noel Edmunds returns to television following the tragic death of a contestant on the cancelled The Late, Late Breakfast Show to present the annual Christmas Morning with Noel live on BBC1.
  - ITV shows the UK network television premieres of the classic 1941 Walt Disney family animated film Dumbo and the 1983 James Bond film Never Say Never Again, with Sean Connery reprising his role as 007.
  - BBC1 attracts the highest audience of all time for a British television drama, more than 30 million viewers, for the Christmas Day episode of EastEnders in which Den Watts (Leslie Grantham) serves divorce papers on his wife Angie (Anita Dobson) after discovering that she had feigned a terminal illness to try to stop him from leaving her in the two-hander episode aired in October.
  - BBC1 shows the network premiere of the 1983 comedy-drama Educating Rita, starring Julie Walters and Michael Caine.
- 26 December
  - ITV airs a 30-minute Christmas special of Rainbow with the Rainbow Christmas Show (aka The Colours of the Rainbow) which is the highest ever rated episode of the show. It was thought that Rainbow would end following this episode, but Thames renews the contract after good ratings and it will continue until 1992 when Thames loses its licence to broadcast.
  - The network television premiere of the 1982 comedy film sequel Airplane II on ITV.
- 27 December – The network television premieres of the hit 1984 romantic fantasy Splash with Tom Hanks, the 1983 dance drama Flashdance with Jennifer Beals and the 1983 Disney Christmas cartoon Mickey's Christmas Carol all on ITV.
- 28 December – BBC1 begins a season of films starring Dustin Hoffman, starting with the network television premiere of the 1982 romantic comedy Tootsie.
- 31 December – New Year's Eve highlights on BBC1 include the network television premiere of the 1984 Australian animated film The Camel Boy and Day After the Fair, a screenplay starring Hannah Gordon, Kenneth Haigh, Anna Massey and Martyn Stanbridge. Terry Wogan welcomes in the New Year from the BBC Television Theatre.

=== Unknown ===
- The Peacock Report recommends that Channel 4 should be given the option to sell its own airtime.
- Viewers' campaigner Mary Whitehouse lobbies advertisers to boycott Channel 4 with some success.
- Channel Television switches its feed of the ITV network from TSW to TVS.
- For 6 months at Friday midnight, pirate television station NeTWork 21 broadcasts to the London area.

== Debuts ==
=== BBC1 ===
- 6 January – Jimbo and the Jet-Set (1986–1987)
- 7 January – Fax (1986–1988)
- 8 January – Wizbit (1986–1988)
- 8 January – First Class (1986–1988)
- 9 January – Blackadder II (1986)
- 10 January – Lovejoy (1986; 1991–1994)
- 12 January – Bluebell (1986)
- 15 January – Running Scared (1986)
- 21 January – The Really Wild Show (1986–2006)
- 24 January – Dynasty II: The Colbys (1985–1987)
- 8 February – Every Second Counts (1986–1993)
- 17 February – Dear John (1986–1987)
- 19 February – You Should Be So Lucky (1986–1987)
- 1 March – The Collectors (1986)
- 23 April – Jossy's Giants (1986–1987)
- 25 April – Comic Relief (1986—present)
- 1 May – Bread (1986–1991)
- 26 May – The Russ Abbot Show (1986–1991)
- 28 May – The Africans: A Triple Heritage (1986)
- 3 June – Kane and Abel (1985)
- 9 June – Hell's Bells (1986)
- 31 August – The Monocled Mutineer (1986)
- 1 September
  - The Mysterious Cities of Gold (1982–1983)
  - Brush Strokes (1986–1991)
- 5 September – Call Me Mister (1986)
- 6 September
  - Casualty (1986–present)
  - Roland Rat: The Series (1986–1988)
- 9 September – Butterfly Island (1985–1987)
- 24 September – Heathcliff (1984–1986)
- 13 October – The Clothes Show (1986–2000, 2006–2009)
- 19 October – David Copperfield (1986)
- 22 October – Pinny's House (1986)
- 27 October
  - One O'Clock News (1986–present)
  - Open Air (1986–1990)
  - Neighbours (1985–2022)
- 29 October – The Cuckoo Sister (1986)
- 16 November – The Singing Detective (1986)
- 24 November – Kilroy (1986–2004)
- 8 December – BBC News Summary (1986–2018)
- 24 December – Babar and Father Christmas (1985)
- 30 December – Slip-Up (1986)

=== BBC2 ===
- 9 January – Yes, Prime Minister (1986–1988)
- 15 January – Dead Head (1986)
- 26 February – Sticks and Stones (1986)
- 12 March – That Uncertain Feeling (1986)
- 1 May – King of the Ghetto (1986)
- 12 May – Naked Video (1986–1991)
- 21 May – A Very Peculiar Practice (1986–1988)
- 29 May – Moonlighting (1985–1989)
- 8 July – Steam Days (1986)
- 9 July – ScreenPlay (1986–1993)
- 23 September – Floyd on Food (1986)
- 8 October
  - The Life and Loves of a She-Devil (1986)
  - The Trouble with Sex (1986)
- 19 November – Breaking Up (1986)
- 9 December – All Passion Spent (1986)

=== ITV ===
- 6 January
  - The Telebugs (1986–1987)
  - Spirit Bay (1986)
- 10 January – Constant Hot Water (1986)
- 9 January – Bellamy's Bugle (1986–1988)
- 12 January – Catchphrase (1986–2002, 2013–present)
- 14 January – Boon (1986–1992, 1995)
- 17 January – Central Weekend (1986–2001)
- 19 January – The Return of the Antelope (1986–1988)
- 1 February – Ask No Questions (1986–1987)
- 10 February – All at No 20 (1986–1987)
- 13 February – Farrington of the F.O. (1986–1987)
- 16 February – Hot Metal (1986–1989)
- 10 March – James the Cat (ITV 1986, Channel 5 1998)
- 3 April – The Raggy Dolls (1986–1994)
- 22 April – The Blunders (1986–1987)
- 27 April – Lord Mountbatten: The Last Viceroy (1986)
- 1 May – Alfred Hitchcock Presents (1985 TV series) (1985–1989)
- 6 May – Ladies in Charge (1986)
- 5 July – John Silver's Return to Treasure Island (1986)
- 14 July – The Wuzzles (1985)
- 29 August – To Have and To Hold (1986)
- 1 September – We'll Think of Something (1986)
- 3 September – Slinger's Day (1986–1987)
- 15 September – Paradise Postponed (1986)
- 23 September – C.A.B. (1986–1989)
- 29 September – Chocky's Challenge (1986)
- 30 September – First Among Equals (1986)
- 6 October – The Trap Door (1986–1990)
- 10 October – Worlds Beyond (1986–1988)
- 20 October –
  - Henry's Leg (1986)
  - Executive Stress (1986–1988)
- 24 October – Lost Empires (1986)
- 25 October – Jem (1985–1988)
- 29 October
  - Strike It Lucky and Strike It Rich (1986–1999)
  - The Equalizer (1985–1989)
- 31 October – The Two of Us (1986–1990)
- 8 November – Unnatural Causes (1986)
- 9 November – Room at the Bottom (1986–1988)
- 12 November – S.W.A.LL.O.W. (1986)
- 22 November – Beadle's About (1986–1996)

=== Channel 4 ===
- 17 February – Kate & Allie (1984–1989)
- 19 February – Prospects (1986)
- 2 March – Mr Pye (1986)
- 11 April
  - The Chart Show (1986–1998, 2008–2009)
  - Revid (1986–1988)
- 13 April – Zastrozzi, A Romance (1986)
- 3 July – What If It's Raining (1986)
- 22 July – Tusitala (1986)
- 31 July – Equinox (1986–2006)

=== Sky Channel ===
- 1 September – The DJ Kat Show (1986–1995)

=== The Children's Channel ===
- 6 January – The Story of Pollyanna, Girl of Love (1986)

== Channels ==
=== New channels ===
Date	Channel
May	Indra Dhnush

=== Defunct channels ===
Date	Channel
1 April	Mirrorvision

== Television shows ==
=== Changes of network affiliation ===
Shows	Moved from	Moved to
Opportunity Knocks	ITV	BBC1

=== Returning this year after a break of one year or longer ===
- 11 September – This Week (1956–1978, 1986–1992)
- 19 September – New Faces (1973–1978, 1986–1988)

== Continuing television shows ==
=== 1920s ===
- BBC Wimbledon (1927–1939, 1946–2019, 2021–present)

=== 1930s ===
- Trooping the Colour (1937–1939, 1946–2019, 2023–present)
- The Boat Race (1938–1939, 1946–2019, 2021–present)
- BBC Cricket (1939, 1946–1999, 2020–2024)

=== 1940s ===
- Come Dancing (1949–1998)

=== 1950s ===
- What's My Line? (1951–1964, 1984–1996)
- Panorama (1953–present)
- What the Papers Say (1956–2008)
- The Sky at Night (1957–present)
- Blue Peter (1958–present)
- Grandstand (1958–2007)

=== 1960s ===
- Coronation Street (1960–present)
- Songs of Praise (1961–present)
- Doctor Who (1963–1989, 1996, 2005–present)
- World in Action (1963–1998)
- Top of the Pops (1964–2006)
- Match of the Day (1964–present)
- Crossroads (1964–1988, 2001–2003)
- Play School (1964–1988)
- Mr. and Mrs. (1965–1999)
- World of Sport (1965–1985)
- Jackanory (1965–1996, 2006)
- Sportsnight (1965–1997)
- Call My Bluff (1965–2005)
- The Money Programme (1966–2010)
- Reksio (1967–1990)
- The Big Match (1968–2002)

=== 1970s ===
- The Old Grey Whistle Test (1971–1987)
- The Two Ronnies (1971–1987, 1991, 1996, 2005)
- Pebble Mill at One (1972–1986)
- Rainbow (1972–1992, 1994–1997)
- Emmerdale (1972–present)
- Newsround (1972–present)
- Weekend World (1972–1988)
- We Are the Champions (1973–1987)
- Last of the Summer Wine (1973–2010)
- That's Life! (1973–1994)
- Wish You Were Here...? (1974–2003)
- Arena (1975–present)
- Jim'll Fix It (1975–1994)
- One Man and His Dog (1976–present)
- 3-2-1 (1978–1988)
- Grange Hill (1978–2008)
- Ski Sunday (1978–present)
- Terry and June (1979–1987)
- The Book Tower (1979–1989)
- Blankety Blank (1979–1990, 1997–2002)
- The Paul Daniels Magic Show (1979–1994)
- Antiques Roadshow (1979–present)
- Question Time (1979–present)

=== 1980s ===
- Play Your Cards Right (1980–1987, 1994–1999, 2002–2003)
- Family Fortunes (1980–2002, 2006–2015, 2020–present)
- Juliet Bravo (1980–1985)
- Cockleshell Bay (1980–1986)
- Children in Need (1980–present)
- Finders Keepers (1981–1985)
- Freetime (1981–1985)
- Game for a Laugh (1981–1985)
- Tenko (1981–1985)
- That's My Boy (1981–1986)
- Razzamatazz (1981–1987)
- Bergerac (1981–1991)
- Odd One Out (1982–1985)
- On Safari (1982–1985)
- 'Allo 'Allo! (1982–1992)
- Wogan (1982–1992)
- Saturday Superstore (1982–1987)
- The Tube (1982–1987)
- Brookside (1982–2003)
- Countdown (1982–present)
- Let's Pretend (TV series) (1982–1988)
- No. 73 (1982–1988)
- Timewatch (1982–present)
- Right to Reply (1982–2001)
- Up the Elephant and Round the Castle (1983–1985)
- Inspector Gadget (1983–1986)
- Bananaman (1983–1986)
- Just Good Friends (1983–1986)
- Philip Marlowe, Private Eye (1983–1986)
- Breadwinners (1983–1986)
- Breakfast Time (1983–1989)
- Dramarama (1983–1989)
- Don't Wait Up (1983–1990)
- Good Morning Britain (1983–1992)
- First Tuesday (1983–1993)
- Highway (1983–1993)
- Blockbusters (1983–93, 1994–95, 1997, 2000–01, 2012, 2019)

== Ending this year ==
- 20 February
  - Blackadder II (1986)
  - SuperTed (1983–1986)
  - Alias the Jester (1985–1986)
- 27 March – In Loving Memory (1969–1986)
- 2 April – The Wall Game (1985–1986)
- 4 April – That's My Boy (1981–1986)
- 15 April – Bananaman (1983–1986)
- 18 April – James the Cat (ITV 1986, Channel 5 1998)
- 22 April – Cockleshell Bay (1980–1986)
- 5 May – The Practice (1985–1986)
- 23 May – Pebble Mill at One (1972–1986, 1991–1996)
- 3 June – Philip Marlowe, Private Eye (1983–1986)
- 4 June – The Blunders (1986)
- 18 June – Bertha the Machine (1985–1986)
- 25 June – The Adventures of Portland Bill (1983–1986)
- 28 June – Robin of Sherwood (1984–1986)
- 17 July – What If It's Raining (1986)
- 26 July – Terrahawks (1983–1986)
- 15 August – The Practice (1985–1986)
- 24 August – Albion Market (1985–1986)
- 16 October – Chocky's Challenge (1986)
- 23 October – Fresh Fields (1984–1986)
- 24 October – News After Noon (1981–1986)
- 6 November – Henry's Leg (1986)
- 8 November – The Late, Late Breakfast Show (1982–1986)
- 10 December – Breaking Up (1986)
- 11 December – Girls on Top (1985–1986)
- 15 December – From the Top (1985–1986)
- 17 December – S.W.A.LL.O.W. (1986)
- 22 December – Dodger, Bonzo and the Rest (1985–1986)
- 23 December – All Passion Spent (1986)
- 25 December
  - Just Good Friends (1983–1986)
  - Duty Free (1984–1986)
  - We Love TV (1984–1986)
  - The Story of Pollyanna, Girl of Love (1986)
  - Breadwinners (1983–1986)

== Births ==
- 1 January
  - Anna Brewster, actress (Versailles)
  - Colin Morgan, actor (Merlin)
- 11 January – Rachel Riley, television presenter
- 21 February – Charlotte Church, soprano
- 25 February – Jameela Jamil, model, and television and radio presenter
- 27 April – Jenna Coleman, actress
- 13 May – Robert Pattinson, actor
- 25 May – Lauren Crace, actress
- 26 August – Nathalie Lunghi, actress
- 2 October – Tom Hudson, actor
- 23 October – Emilia Clarke, actress
- 13 November – Kevin Bridges, Scottish comedian
- 1 December – Andrew Tate, media personality

== Deaths ==
Date	Name	Age	Profession and notable programmes
3 January	Dustin Gee	43	comedian
5 January	Thomas Heathcote	68	actor
11 January	Sid Chaplin	69	screenwriter
20 January	Alex Munro	74	comedian
6 February	Dandy Nichols	78	actress (Till Death Us Do Part)
23 February	Beatrix Thomson	85	actress
10 March	Ray Milland	79	Welsh-born actor
21 March	Derek Farr	74	actor (BBC Television Shakespeare)
1 May	Hylda Baker	81	actress and comedienne (Nearest and Dearest)
14 May	William Lindsay	40	actor
24 May	Robert Holmes	60	television scriptwriter
26 May	Peggy Ann Clifford	65	actress
2 June	Jimmy Grafton	70	television producer and scriptwriter
6 June	Tony Wright	60	actor (The Saint)
23 June	Nigel Stock	66	actor (Owen, M.D.)
24 June	George Howe	86	actor
17 September	Pat Phoenix	62	actress (Elsie Tanner in Coronation Street)
20 September	Dennis Spooner	53	scriptwriter (Doctor Who, Randall and Hopkirk (Deceased))
22 September	Janet Davies	59	actress (Dad's Army)
28 September	Denis Carey	77	actor (Elizabeth R, I, Claudius, The Barchester Chronicles)
11 October	John Crockett	68	television director
13 October	Maidie Andrews	93	actress
13 October	Eunice Crowther	70	choreographer
28 October	Ian Marter	42	actor and writer
28 October	Eddie Waring	76	rugby commentator and presenter
6 November	Howard Thomas	77	television executive
19 November	Billy Dainty	59	comedian
23 November	Derek Hart	61	television presenter
29 November	Ronald Baddiley	64	actor (Crown Court)
1 December	Robert Lee	73	actor
21 December	Bill Simpson	55	actor (Dr. Finlay's Casebook)

== See also ==
- 1986 in British music
- 1986 in British radio
- 1986 in the United Kingdom
- List of British films of 1986
