= The Laughter Show =

British TV series (1984–91)

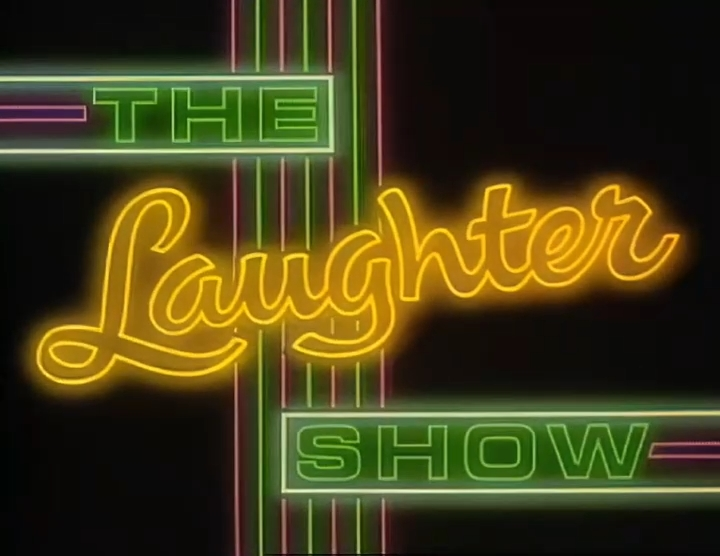
- Directed by: John Bishop Series 1-3, 6 Michael Leggo Series 4-5
- Starring: Dustin Gee (Series 1-3); Les Dennis; Roy Jay (Series 1); Caroline Dennis (Series 1)
- Theme music composer: Bobby Gubby
- Ending theme: Bucks Fizz - Series 1
- Country of origin: United Kingdom
- Original language: English
- No. of series: 8
- No. of episodes: 51 (including. 3 Christmas specials)

Production
- Producer: John Bishop
- Running time: Average 34 minutes
- Production company: BBC

Original release
- Network: BBC1
- Release: 7 April 1984 – 27 July 1991

The Laughter Show is a BBC comedy sketch show, which featured Dustin Gee and Les Dennis (along with Roy Jay and Caroline Dennis in 1984), from 1984 to 1986, and then only featured Dennis until 1991.

== History ==
Dustin Gee and Les Dennis both started their TV careers on Who Do You Do? in 1975, forming their partnership then. The pair went on to appear on stage and TV including Russ Abbot's Madhouse. In 1984, BBC 1 gave the pair their own show, The Laughter Show, whilst they continued to work on Russ Abbot's Madhouse.

This was the show that included their most notable impressions, as Coronation Street's Vera Duckworth in two-handers with Mavis Riley.

On 3 January 1986 Dustin Gee died suddenly and unexpectedly of a heart attack shortly before transmission of the third series (which had already been recorded) was due to start. The series continued with Les Dennis, retitled The Les Dennis Laughter Show, until 1991.

== Series ==
=== 1984 - The Laughter Show - Series 1 ===
- Pilot Episode - Starring Les Dennis, Dustin Gee, Roy Jay, Caroline Dennis, with guests Matt Bianco, Hale & Pace
- Episode 1–7 April - Starring Les Dennis, Dustin Gee, Roy Jay, Caroline Dennis, with guests David Copperfield, David Essex, Hale & Pace
- Episode 2–14 April - Starring Les Dennis, Dustin Gee, Roy Jay, Caroline Dennis, with guests Lorraine Chase, Brian Conley, Hale & Pace
- Episode 3–21 April - Starring Les Dennis, Dustin Gee, Roy Jay, Caroline Dennis, with guests Su Pollard, Shakin' Stevens, Hale & Pace, Trevillion & Nine
- Episode 4–28 April - Starring Les Dennis, Dustin Gee, Roy Jay, Caroline Dennis, with guests Al Dean, Nik Kershaw, Hale & Pace, Rondo Veneziano

=== 1985 - The Laughter Show - Series 2 ===
- Episode 1–16 February - Starring Les Dennis, Dustin Gee with guests The Black Abbotts, Pete Price, Linda Barr, Bella Emberg, David Masterman, Nick Wilton
- Episode 2–23 February - Starring Les Dennis, Dustin Gee with guests Larry Grayson, Gerard Kenny, Jeff Stevenston, Bella Emberg, Jane Cussons
- Episode 3–2 March - Starring Les Dennis, Dustin Gee with guests Roy Jay, Roy Walker, Harvey and the Wallbangers, Bella Emberg, Jane Cussons
- Episode 4–9 March - Starring Les Dennis, Dustin Gee with guests, Gary Wilmot, Sherrie Hewson, Bella Emberg, Jane Cussons, Rex Robinson, and "music is provided by the talented newcomer Jani".
- Episode 5–16 March - Starring Les Dennis, Dustin Gee with guests Michael Barrymore, Peter Piper, Roy Walker, Bella Emberg, Ruth Kettlewell, Nick Wilton, Jane Perry
- Episode 6–23 March - Starring Les Dennis, Dustin Gee with guests Greg Rogers, Susie Blake, Harvey and the Wallbangers, Bella Emberg, David Masterman

=== 1986 - Les & Dustin's Laughter Show - Series 3 ===
- Episode 1–28 December 1985 - Starring Les Dennis, Dustin Gee with guests Roy Walker, Susie Blake
- Episode 2–18 January - Starring Les Dennis, Dustin Gee with guests Glynn Edwards, Black Onyx, Made in England
- Episode 3–25 January - Starring Les Dennis, Dustin Gee with guests Roy Walker, Five Star, Debbie Arnold, Leslie Crowther, Charles Pemberton
- Episode 4–1 February - Starring Les Dennis, Dustin Gee with guests Mia Carla, Buster Merryfield, Dudley Stevens, The Flaming Mussolinis
- Episode 5–8 February - Starring Les Dennis, Dustin Gee with guests John Challis, Laura Francis, Jessica Martin, Royce Mills, Gary Wilmot, Black Onyx, Roy Walker
- Episode 6–15 February - Starring Les Dennis, Dustin Gee with guests Susie Blake, John Bluthal, Nula Conwell, Jeffrey Holland, Greg Rogers
- Episode 7–22 February - Starring Les Dennis, Dustin Gee with guests Dean Park, Graeme Garden, Tania Jones, Jessica Martin, Sonny Hayes & Co

=== 1987 - Les Dennis's Laughter Show - Series 4 ===
- Episode 1–13 June - Starring Les Dennis with guests Joe Longthorne, Martin Daniels, Lisa Maxwell, Shane Richie, Donald Hewlett, Aiden Waters
- Episode 2–20 June - Starring Les Dennis with guests Joe Longthorne, Martin Daniels, Lisa Maxwell, The 2 Marks, Bella Emberg
- Episode 3–27 June - Starring Les Dennis with guests Joe Longthorne, Martin Daniels, Lisa Maxwell, Wayne Dobson, Jeffrey Holland
- Episode 4–4 July - Starring Les Dennis with guests Joe Longthorne, Martin Daniels, Lisa Maxwell, Richard Digance, Aiden Waters
- Episode 5–11 July - Starring Les Dennis with guests Joe Longthorne, Martin Daniels, Lisa Maxwell, Billy Pearce, Mike Reid, Lou Hirsch
- Episode 6–18 July - Starring Les Dennis with guests Joe Longthorne, Martin Daniels, Lisa Maxwell, Jeff Stevenston

=== 1988 - The Les Dennis Laughter Show - Series 5 ===
- Episode 1–28 May - Starring Les Dennis with guests Joe Longthorne, Mark Walker (entertainer), Lisa Maxwell, Bella Emberg, Jeffrey Holland, Jim Bowen, Mark Heap, John Junkin, Mark Saban, Jeff Richer Dancers
- Episode 2–4 June - Starring Les Dennis with guests Joe Longthorne, Martin Daniels, Lisa Maxwell, Bella Emberg, Myrtle Devenish, Stuart Fell, Mark Heap, Robert Rawles, Mark Saban, Basil Soper, Jeff Richer Dancers
- Episode 3–11 June - Starring Les Dennis with guests Joe Longthorne, Mark Walker, Lisa Maxwell, Bella Emberg, Jeffrey Holland, Lila Kaye, Mark Heap, Geoffrey Russell, Mark Saban, Jeff Richer Dancers
- Episode 4–18 June - Starring Les Dennis with guests Joe Longthorne, Martin Daniels, Mark Walker, Lisa Maxwell, Bella Emberg, Jeffrey Holland, Craig Ferguson, Gordon Kennedy, Alex Norton, Jeff Richer Dancers
- Episode 5–25 June - Starring Les Dennis with guests Joe Longthorne, Gorden Kaye, Mark Walker, Lisa Maxwell, Bella Emberg, Jeffrey Holland, Craig Ferguson, Gordon Kennedy, Alex Norton, Mark Heap, Mark Saban, Jeff Richer Dancers
- Episode 6–2 July - Starring Les Dennis with guests Joe Longthorne, Martin Daniels, Lisa Maxwell, Bella Emberg, Jeffrey Holland, Eamonn Walker, Mark Heap, Mark Saban, Dorothy Vernon, Jeff Richer Dancers
- Episode 7–9 July - Starring Les Dennis with guests Joe Longthorne, Mark Walker, Lisa Maxwell, Bella Emberg, Jim Bowen, Lou Hirsch, Mark Heap, Mark Saban, Molly Weir, Angus Lennie, Jeff Richer Dancers
- Episode 8–16 July - Starring Les Dennis with guests Joe Longthorne, Martin Daniels, Lisa Maxwell, Bella Emberg, Jeffrey Holland, Mark Walker, Mark Heap, Mark Saban, Lou Hirsch, John Junkin, Alex Norton, Jeff Richer Dancers
- 1988 Christmas special-27 December - Starring Les Dennis with guests Martin Daniels, Lisa Maxwell, Bella Emberg, George Layton, Mark Walker, Gary Lovini, Bruce Callender, Christopher Fah, Jeff Richer Dancers

=== 1989 - The Les Dennis Laughter Show - Series 6 ===
- Episode 1–10 June - Starring Les Dennis with guests Martin Daniels, Lisa Maxwell, Bella Emberg, Jeffrey Holland, Mark Walker (entertainer), Burt Kwouk, Colin Skeaping, Tip Tipping, Jeff Richer Dancers
- Episode 2–17 June - Starring Les Dennis with guests Martin Daniels, Lisa Maxwell, Bella Emberg, Donald Hewlett, Mark Walker, Eric Carte, Brian Conway, Paul Shearer, Grahame Wyles, Jeff Richer Dancers
- Episode 3–24 June - Starring Les Dennis with guests Martin Daniels, Lisa Maxwell, Mark Walker, Donald Hewlett, Michael Stainton, Nicholas Bennett, Jeff Richer Dancers
- Episode 4–1 July - Starring Les Dennis with guests Martin Daniels, Lisa Maxwell, Roy Hudd, Donald Hewlett, Mark Walker, Lou Hirsch, Ed Bishop, Jeff Richer Dancers
- Episode 5–8 July - Starring Les Dennis with guests Martin Daniels, Lisa Maxwell, Robert East, Benedict Eccles, Mark Walker, Graham Wyles, Jeff Richer Dancers
- Episode 6–15 July - Starring Les Dennis with guests Martin Daniels, Lisa Maxwell, George Layton, Mark Walker, Jeffrey Holland, Jeff Richer Dancers
- 1989 Christmas Special - 23 December - Starring Les Dennis with guests Lisa Maxwell, Bella Emberg, Mac McDonald Bruce Callender, Martin Daniels, Gary Lovini, Jeff Richer Dancers, Val Stokes Singers

=== 1990 - The Les Dennis Laughter Show - Series 7 ===
- Episode 1–9 June - Starring Les Dennis with guests Martin Daniels, Lisa Maxwell, John Martin, Roy Holder, Dominic Lake
- Episode 2–16 June - Starring Les Dennis with guests Martin Daniels, Lisa Maxwell, Bella Emberg, Mark Walker (entertainer), Chris Greener, Roy Holder, Anthony Millan, Jonathan Prince, The Richard Sampson Dancers
- Episode 3–23 June - Starring Les Dennis with guests Martin Daniels, Lisa Maxwell, Bella Emberg, Mark Walker, Jonathan Prince, The Richard Sampson Dancers
- Episode 4–30 June - Starring Les Dennis with guests Martin Daniels, Lisa Maxwell, John Martin, Roy Holder, John Gleeson, Jonathan Prince, The Richard Sampson Dancers
- Episode 5–14 July - Starring Les Dennis with guests Martin Daniels, Lisa Maxwell, Mark Walker, Roy Holder, John Gleeson
- Episode 6–21 July - Starring Les Dennis with guests Martin Daniels, Lisa Maxwell, Mike Ozman, Roy Holder, Diane Langton
- 1990 Christmas Special - 22 December - Starring Les Dennis with guests, Lisa Maxwell, Gary Lovini, Mark Robertson (juggler), Brian Glover, Jonathan Prince, Jonathan Prince, The Richard Sampson Dancers

=== 1991 - The Les Dennis Laughter Show - Series 8 ===
- Episode 1–22 June - Starring Les Dennis with guests Martin Daniels, Lisa Maxwell, Bruce Grobbelaar, Benedict Eccles, Roy Holder, Herbert Johnston, Clayton Mark, Roger Mark, The Richard Sampson Dancers
- Episode 2–29 June - Starring Les Dennis with guests Martin Daniels, Lisa Maxwell, John Gleeson, Roy Holder, David Masterman, Stuart St Paul, Michael Sheard, The Richard Sampson Dancers
- Episode 3–6 July - Starring Les Dennis with guests Martin Daniels, Lisa Maxwell, Bryn Williams, Roy Holder, David Masterman, The Richard Sampson Dancers
- Episode 4–13 July - Starring Les Dennis with guests Martin Daniels, Sherrie Hewson, John Martin, Roy Holder, Owen Brenman, Benedict Eccles, Stuart Fell, Diane Langton, David Masterman,, The Richard Sampson Dancers
- Episode 5–20 July - Starring Les Dennis with guests Martin Daniels, Sherrie Hewson, John Martin, Roy Holder, Owen Brenman, Gail Harrison, Elizabeth Norton, Peter Stockbridge, David Masterman,, The Richard Sampson Dancers
- Episode 6–27 July - Starring Les Dennis with guests Martin Daniels, Sherrie Hewson, John Martin, Roy Holder, Owen Brenman, Joanne Heywood, Brian Glover, Herbert Johnson, David Masterman, The Richard Sampson Dancers
