= Roy Jay =

British stand-up comedian (1948–2007)

- Jay c. 1982
- Born: Roy Jørgensen; 1948; Oslo, Norway
- Died: December 2007 (aged 59); Alicante, Spain
- Occupations: Comedian, singer
- Years active: 1972–2007

Roy Jay (born Jørgensen; 1948 – December 2007), was a British–Norwegian comedian. He performed with musical accompaniment and wearing a prison uniform decorated with broad arrows, speaking in an American accent and telling jokes interspersed with his "spook!" and "slither hither" catchphrases. Jay made high-profile television appearances in the 1980s, including in The Little and Large Show, The Bob Monkhouse Show, The Laughter Show, and The Main Attraction.

== Early life ==
According to one account, Jay was born as Roy Jørgensen in Oslo, the son of a Norwegian father and a Scottish/Irish mother. He left Norway with his family at age four to live in South Wales. When he was eight, he spent a year in Cork, Ireland, studying Irish and the violin, after which time he returned to his parents in Wales. The family soon moved again, to Atherton, Greater Manchester, England, where he attended Hesketh Fletcher High School. Aged 15, Roy joined the Royal Norwegian Navy. Returning to civilian life, he performed as a singer in a band that performed in small Northern clubs and dance halls. Following this, Jay became Assistant Entertainments Manager at Pontins holiday camp in Southport, where he began performing stand-up comedy.

Jay worked for Pontins in Morecambe starting in 1968, primarily as a singer, but also as a comedian. In the following five years he continued working on his act while beginning to tour the local club circuit, eventually refining it from typical stand-up to a more eccentric character-based routine.

== Career ==
In 1973, Roy Jay topped the bill in cabaret following the Miss Gibraltar beauty pageant, broadcast by GBC, the Gibraltar Broadcasting Corporation. Jay toured the clubs of England, Ireland, Scotland, and Wales before being offered a three-month tour of South Africa in 1975. Jay stayed for eight months and rapidly built a following in the country before returning to the UK. In 1979, The Stage described Jay as "like no one else" and tipped him for future stardom. At this time, Jay employed a look inspired by the teddy boy era, and his act encompassed singing and impressions of Leo Sayer and Gene Vincent, amongst others.

In the early 1980s, Jay began appearing on television with his "Spook Spook Slither Hither" act. Jay would prowl around the stage to musical accompaniment wearing a convict's uniform, telling jokes interjected with his catchphrases. He would often remark, "you'll all be doing it tomorrow", in reference to his act. In 1982, Jay self-released a single, "Vehicle / You Might Need Somebody". The A-side is a version of the 1970 hit single by the Ides of March, often the musical accompaniment to Jay's act. These two tracks were included on a self-titled album on Clubland Records later that year. The album includes Jay's versions of popular songs, including John Lee Hooker's "Dimples", Procol Harum's "A Whiter Shade of Pale", and Leo Sayer's "The Show Must Go On". In 1983, Jay appeared in The Bob Monkhouse Show and was introduced by Monkhouse as "a new comedian with a style that's all his own". In June that year, Jay appeared on Chas and Dave's show Knees-Up. Jay achieved his greatest fame around this time, appearing in television advertisements for Smiths Square Crisps and Schweppes lemonade. On 7 April 1984, Jay first starred with Les Dennis and Dustin Gee as a regular in the first series of BBC One's The Laughter Show.

On 29 August 1984, Jay performed at the exclusive Inn on the Park club in Jersey. Frustrated with hecklers, he dropped his trousers on stage in front of a family audience. Jay was fined £200 after admitting indecent exposure. The incident received media coverage and dented Jay's public image. Jay did not appear as a regular in the second series of The Laughter Show but did make a guest appearance in the third episode on 2 March 1985.

== Later years and death ==
In later years, Jay performed in Benidorm first at The Talk of the Coast and later at the cabaret bar Chaplins in the English Square. He opened for Sticky Vicky. Roy Jay died in December 2007, in Alicante, Spain, at 59 years old. Money to pay for his funeral was raised by local friends and fans.
