= Beadle's About =

- Genre: Comedy
- Created by: Ralph Edwards
- Presented by: Jeremy Beadle
- Theme music composer: Laurie Holloway
- Country of origin: United Kingdom
- Original language: English
- No. of series: 10
- No. of episodes: 93

Production
- Producers: Keith Stewart (1986); Richard Hearsey (1987)
- Production location: The London Studios
- Running time: 30 minutes (inc. adverts)
- Production companies: LWT in association with Ralph Edwards Productions and Action Time

Original release
- Network: ITV
- Release: 22 November 1986 – 31 October 1996

Related
- Game for a Laugh

Beadle's About is a British television programme hosted and written by Jeremy Beadle, where members of the public became victims of practical jokes, filmed by hidden cameras. It was produced by LWT for ITV, and ran on Saturday nights from 22 November 1986 to 31 October 1996.

== Format ==
The format originated as an element of the show Game for a Laugh, which Beadle co-presented. Many of the practical jokes involved someone's car or van secretly being swapped for an identical one, and then having a disaster befall it, such as exploding, falling into the sea, or being dropped from a great height, as the owner of the vehicle looked on in horror. Another common prank was for unauthorised building works to be carried out close to, or within, the victim's home or garden.

After a few minutes, Beadle would appear in disguise (typically, as a policeman or some other figure of authority, and often wearing a fake beard on top of his natural beard), and interact with the shell-shocked and/or irate victim. He would subtly drop more and more hints and would remove his disguise and point a stick microphone at the person. As the public were familiar with Beadle from the earlier show Game for a Laugh, they would then immediately realise they had been had, often with the words "I don't believe it!". A follow-up series was entitled 'It's Beadle!' which followed a similar format.

== Memorable pranks ==
One of the most notable pranks was where Dorset resident Janet Elford was convinced into believing that aliens had landed in her garden. Members of the public were set up by a resident team of Beadle's About actors including: Pam Cole, Ricky Diamond, Tony McHale, Nicholas Young and Flavia Brilli.

== Popularity ==
At its peak, the show attracted approximately 15 million viewers, making it one of ITV's most popular Saturday night programmes during that period. After the show was axed by ITV in 1996, Beadle's About was repeated on Granada Plus in the late 1990s.

The show was then repeated in full on Challenge TV throughout the 2000s; although Challenge (and sister channels Ftn and Virgin 1) sometimes aired certain Beadle's About sketches (under the banner The Best of Beadle's About) as programming fillers whenever the channel had allocated time to fill after programmes finished early, Beadle's About then was not repeated in full on national TV for over a decade afterwards, until That's TV announced in December 2021 that the programme would feature in its Christmas schedule alongside other ITV programmes like The Benny Hill Show and Kenny Everett's New Year Specials.

== Profanity bubble ==
The "Bleep!" or "Oops!" bubble used to block out offensive language was a well known feature from the show. The bubbles were simply clouds with either "Bleep!" or "Oops!" in them, the text being set in Balloon typeface. These were also used to cover up offensive hand gestures as well.

The record of the most times it was used on one stunt was 105 in 1990. Beadle even gave the person a bag of bleeps for setting the record.

Jeremy once revealed in an interview that during editing, they deliberately inserted "bleeps" where there were no profanities as this made it funnier.

== Transmissions ==
=== Series ===
Series	Start date	End date	Episodes	Recorded
1	22 November 1986	27 December 1986	6	1986
2	5 September 1987	24 October 1987	8	1987
3	22 October 1988	17 December 1988	9	1988
4	16 September 1989	2 December 1989	11	1989
5	15 September 1990	24 November 1990	11	1990
6	22 September 1991	1 December 1991	10	1991
7	10 October 1992	26 December 1992	10	1992
8	29 October 1993	12 February 1994	10	1993
9	11 March 1995	20 May 1995	10	1994
10	29 June 1996	31 October 1996	10	1995

=== Highlights Specials ===
Date
9 December 1989
16 December 1989
8 September 1990
8 December 1990
15 December 1990
30 December 1990
27 December 1991
22 February 1992
18 April 1992
3 April 1993
10 April 1993
18 April 1993
21 August 1993
4 September 1993
11 September 1993
19 February 1994
24 June 1994
12 August 1994

== DVD releases ==
The first two series of Beadle's About have been released on DVD by Network.

DVD title	Discs	Year	Episodes	Release date
Complete Series 1	1	1986	6	28 March 2011
Complete Series 2	1	1987	8	2 April 2012
