= Lingo (British game show) =

British game show

- Genre: Game show
- Based on: Lingo by Ralph Andrews
- Presented by: Martin Daniels (Original); Adil Ray (Revival); RuPaul (Celebrity Lingo)
- Voices of: Nick Jackson (Original)
- Country of origin: United Kingdom
- Original language: English
- No. of series: 1 (Original); 4 (Revival); 2 (Celebrity)
- No. of episodes: 10 (Original); 169; 1 unaired (Revival); 17 (Celebrity Lingo)

Production
- Production location: Dock10 (Revival)
- Running time: 30 minutes (Original); 60 minutes (Revival); 30-60 minutes (Celebrity)
- Production companies: Thames in association with Ralph Andrews Presentations and Action Time (Original); Objective Media Group North and Objective Entertainment (Note: Known as Triple Brew Media for series 2 to 4) (Revival)

Original release
- Network: ITV
- Release: 12 May – 14 July 1988
- Release: 1 January 2021 – present

Lingo is a British game show. Originally hosted by Martin Daniels, it ran for one series between 12 May and 14 July 1988, before being revived in 2021 with Adil Ray as the host. The programme involves contestants decoding words based on their first letter, similar to the word game Jotto. In the original version, correctly guessed words also allowed contestants to draw numbers and mark spaces off a bingo card.

The series was initially produced by Thames Television and Action Time and was based on the American version of the same name. The revival series is produced by Objective Media Group, and is based on the Dutch version. Following the success of the revival, a celebrity version was aired between 4 September and 19 November 2022, hosted by RuPaul. A second series of Celebrity Lingo was aired in 2026 with Adil Ray as host, before the series was shelved by ITV in September 2026.

== Gameplay ==
The game is played between teams of two contestants, tasked with solving mystery words. The team in control is given the first letter of each mystery word and receives five attempts to guess and spell the word. After each guess, the team is told whether their guess contains letters that are in the mystery word and whether or not they are in the correct position.

Teams have five guesses to solve each word. Should a team fail to identify the correct word within five guesses, take longer than 10 seconds to make a guess, misspell a word, or give a word not in an approved dictionary, the team does not earn any money for that word. In later rounds, other teams may make a guess, and will earn the money associated with that word if their guess is correct.

Contestants who are deaf or hearing-impaired are allowed to have an interpreter on the set, who may interpret between spoken words and sign language. However, the interpreter is forbidden from helping with solving the words.

=== Round 1 ===
Each team solves four four-letter words (three four-letter words in series 1) worth £200 each, followed by a nine-letter Puzzleword (ten letters in series 1); a word with an often cryptic clue and the first letter given. Letters are revealed sporadically, with the value of the word decreasing after each letter is revealed. The Puzzleword starts with a value of £300, decreasing to a minimum of £100 once five more letters have been given.

=== Round 2 ===
Each team solves three five-letter words worth £300 each, followed by a ten-letter Puzzleword (eleven-letter Puzzleword in series 1), initially worth £400. In this round, if a team does not correctly guess a word, the other teams may buzz in and make a guess to try and steal the money. The team with the least amount of money after round 1 plays first, and the team with the least amount of money at the end of this round is eliminated.

=== Round 3 ===
One member of each team is assigned to four-letter words and the other member of each team is assigned to five-letter words respectively with each member receiving two words alternately. Each word is worth up to £500, but its value decreases by £50 for each attempt. As with round 2, if one team fails to correctly guess the word, the other team have a chance to guess the word and win £300 if they are correct. However, if a team gives an incorrect word with more than one guess left, the other team is allowed all of the remaining guesses. An eleven-letter Puzzleword (twelve letters in series 1) is played after the four-letter words, and a twelve-letter Puzzleword (eleven letters in series 2-3) is played after the five-letter words. Each Puzzleword is worth up to £750, and both teams may buzz in and make a guess at any time. After the second Puzzleword is played, the team with less money is eliminated and the winning team progresses to the final.

=== Final ===
The winning team has 90 seconds to solve three more words in order to claim their winnings. If the team cannot solve a word, they may pass and receive a new one. The team must first solve one four-letter word to claim half of their winnings, then one five-letter word to claim the entirety of their winnings and then one six-letter word to double their winnings. From series 3 onwards, the team may choose to go for either a six-letter word for double their winnings, or a seven-letter word to win £15,000. If a team runs out of time, they take home the money they had earned up to that point; however, if they attempt a seven-letter word and do not complete it in time, they go home with nothing.

Since series 4, winning teams are allowed to stay on for up to three shows, regardless of how they do in the final round. The maximum possible jackpot is £45,000; as of the end of series 4, the highest amount won so far is £25,185.

== Original version ==
In the 1988 version (which was based on the original U.S. syndicated version), the game was played between two teams. They were each assigned a 25-space "Lingo card" (similar to American bingo) with ten numbers on each card already marked (such that two were marked off on each horizontal row and two on each vertical column). The blue team’s card contained only odd numbers, while the green team played with even numbers. Each word was five letters in length and each correct guess awarded £50. Upon guessing correctly, the team would draw two balls from a hopper containing balls with the 15 remaining numbers on the card, two white surprise balls and three red balls. Drawn numbers were marked off on the team's Lingo card, and surprise balls awarded the team a prize. Drawing a red ball immediately ended the team's turn and passed control to their opponents. Forming a "Lingo" line of five numbers in a row vertically, horizontally or diagonally awarded a £100 bonus.

The team with the highest score at the end of the game advanced to the bonus round "No Lingo"; the team was given a new card with 16 spaces covered, arranged in a star shape along the diagonals, middle row and middle column (but excluding the centre space). Unlike the main game, the objective was to avoid forming a line of five in a row. The team once again had to solve mystery words (given the first letter and one additional letter) but were required to draw one ball afterward for each guess taken. If they failed to guess after five attempts, they had to draw two additional balls as a penalty (seven total). The hopper initially contains 39 numbered balls consisting of the even figures from 2 to 80 (but excluding the ball corresponding to the centre space) and one silver ball.

If the team drew a numbered ball, it was discarded and marked off if it appeared on their card. If the team drew the silver ball, they no longer had to draw any more numbers for the round and the silver ball was returned to the hopper. After each successful round, the team's pot is doubled and they are given the option to leave with their winnings or play another round. If the team forms a Lingo at any point, the game ends and the team's bonus winnings are reduced by half. Up to five rounds could be played, beginning with a base pot of £100 and progressing to the grand prize of £3,200, beginning with the second round, the ball corresponding to the centre space is added to the hopper.

== Celebrity Lingo ==
=== 2022 version ===
The 2022 version followed mostly the same rules as the civilian version, except the word values were increased to £500 (round 1), £750 (round 2) and £1,000 (round 3). Puzzlewords were also increased to £750 (eight letters), £1,000 (nine letters) and £1,500 (ten letters) respectively. Losing teams' charities received a consolation prize of £1,000. This version was hosted by RuPaul.

=== 2026 version ===
The 2026 version consisted of 30-minute episodes, and was therefore played with only two teams. It was hosted by Adil Ray.

==== Round 1 ====
Each team guesses three four-letter words, with the value dropping after each guess (starting at £1,000 on the first guess, before falling to £750, £550, £450 and finally £350 if solved on the last guess). Each team then solves an eight-letter Puzzleword, starting at £1,500 and decreasing by £150 for each extra letter revealed. As with round 1 of the original format, if a word is not correctly guessed, other teams cannot steal.

==== Round 2 ====
Each team solves two five-letter words, with play alternating between teams. Words are worth £1,500 if guessed on the first try, then drop to £1,100, £900, £700 and finally £500 for a correct guess on the final try. Teams are now able to steal words if the other team does not guess correctly. After each team has played two words, a nine-letter Puzzleword is played that both teams can attempt, worth up to £2,000 and decreasing by £150 for every extra letter revealed. After this, the team with more money progresses to the final. The losing team keeps their money and splits it between their chosen charities.

==== Final ====
The rules of the final are the same as in the civilian version, though the seven-letter word is not offered and teams do not stay on for multiple shows.

== Transmissions ==
=== Original ===
| Series | Start date | End date | Episodes |
|---|---|---|---|
| 1 | 12 May 1988 | 14 July 1988 | 10 |

=== Revival ===
| Series | Start date | End date | Episodes |
|---|---|---|---|
| 1 | 1 January 2021 | 12 February 2021 | 30 |
| 2 | 8 November 2021 | 4 February 2022 | 59 (Note: Commissioned for 60 episodes, 1 episode is unaired until the foreseeable future.) |
| 3 | 2 January 2023 | 23 October 2024 | 50 |
| 3 | 18 February 2025 | | 50 |
| 4 | 6 January 2025 | 17 February 2025 | 30 |
| 5 | 27 May 2026 (Note: Soccer Aid special.) | | 30 |
| 5 | 26 October 2026 | TBD | 30 |

=== Celebrity ===
| Series | Start date | End date | Episodes |
|---|---|---|---|
| 1 | 4 September 2022 | 19 November 2022 | 7 |
| 2 | 25 February 2026 | 22 April 2026 | 10 |

== See also ==
- Wordle
