= Lisa Maxwell (actress) =

British actress and television presenter (born 1963)

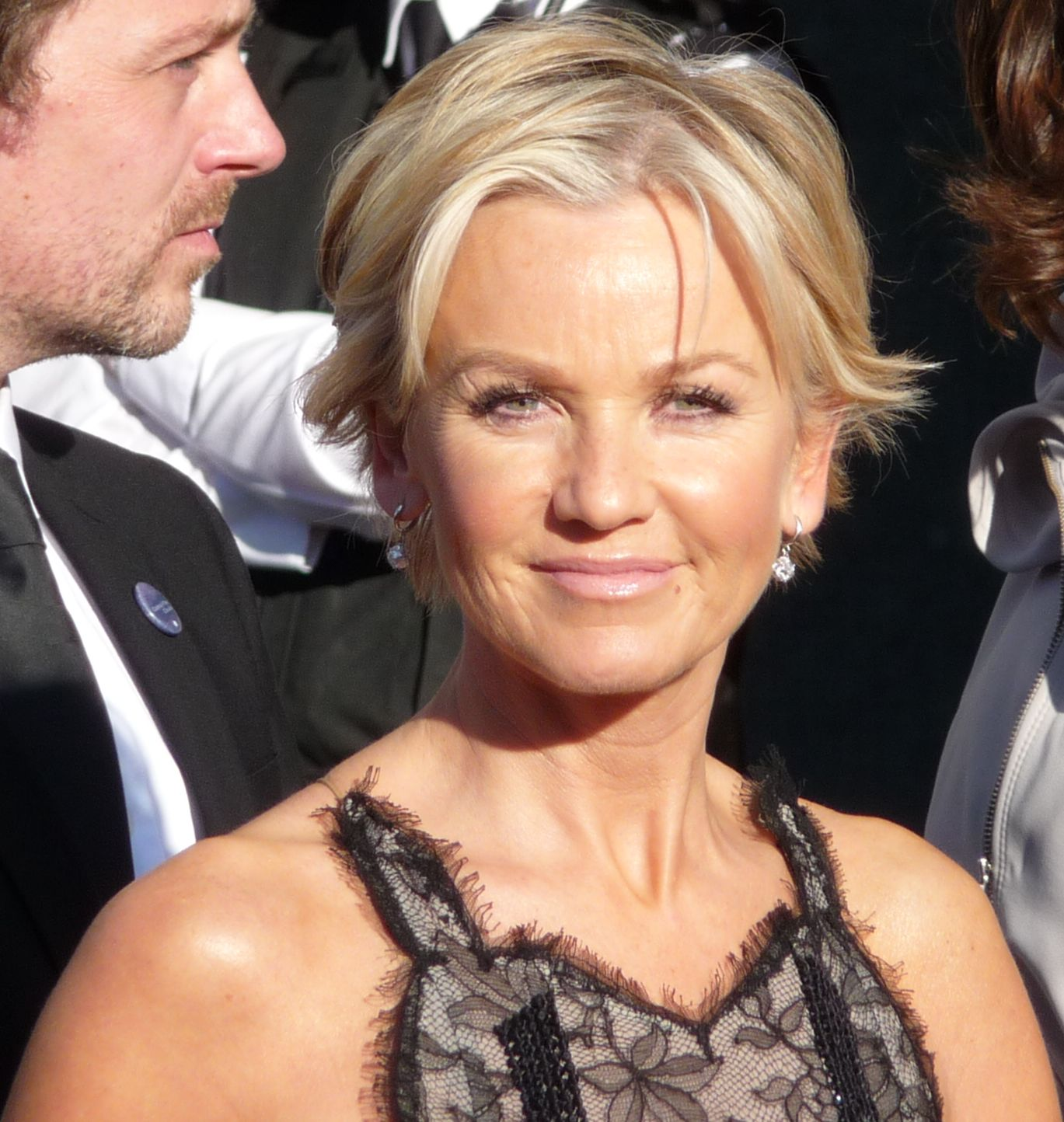
- at the British Academy Television Awards 2009 in London
- Born: 24 November 1963 (age 62); Elephant and Castle, London, England
- Education: Italia Conti Academy of Theatre Arts
- Occupations: Actress, television presenter
- Years active: 1976–present
- Spouse: Paul Jessup (m. 2014)
- Children: 1
- Parent(s): John Murphy, Valerie Maxwell

Lisa Maxwell (born 24 November 1963) is an English actress and television presenter, best known for her role in The Bill as Samantha Nixon. Between 2009 and 2014, she was a regular panellist on ITV chat show series Loose Women.

== Early life ==
Maxwell was born in the Elephant & Castle district of Southwark, South London, in November 1963. When she was conceived, her father, John Murphy, already had a pregnant wife. Her 22-year-old mother, Valerie Maxwell, returned to her parents' home, where the three of them brought up Maxwell. She met her father for the first time when she was 45. She has three paternal half-siblings.

Maxwell was educated at the Italia Conti Academy of Theatre Arts, and first acted on TV aged 11, in a schools programme A Place Like Home. In 1981, she participated in BBC TV's A Song for Europe as a member of the group Unity. They finished in last place.

== Career ==
=== Acting ===
Maxwell's first senior role was in Remembrance (1982), and in the same year she voiced Kira in the Jim Henson film The Dark Crystal.

In 1993, she auditioned for the part of Daphne Moon in Frasier, but the part eventually went to Jane Leeves.

She played Detective Inspector Samantha Nixon in the ITV1 drama The Bill between 2002 and 2009. She joined the cast in late 2001 and filmed her last scenes on The Bill on 20 March 2009.

In September 2013, she appeared in the BBC One soap opera EastEnders, playing Naomi, the girlfriend of established character David Wicks (Michael French).

In 2016, Maxwell played Judy Garland in the UK tour of End of the Rainbow and also joined the cast of Hollyoaks as Tracey Donovan, the mother of established character Grace Black (Tamara Wall) and her half-brothers, Adam (Jimmy Essex), Liam (Maxim Baldry) and Jesse (Luke Jerdy).

In May 2018, it was announced that she would be appearing in Celebrity MasterChef later that year.

=== Comedy ===
Maxwell appeared on The Russ Abbot Show in 1990, which led to her getting her own short-lived TV show, The Lisa Maxwell Show, on BBC television in 1991.

=== Presenting ===
In 1985, Maxwell won a television vote to become a presenter on the BBC Two pop music show No Limits.

She then went on to become a presenter on a number of children's programmes, including Children's ITV flagship magazine programme Splash!.

In March 2009, Maxwell began appearing as a regular panellist on ITV's lunchtime chat show, Loose Women. However, soon after starting, she was forced to take a break after she fractured two ribs. She returned to the show on 10 June 2009. In March 2014, it was announced that she was to leave the show immediately, saying: "It's not the same show".

=== Other appearances ===
Maxwell was the subject of This Is Your Life in 2003 when she was surprised by Michael Aspel while recording an episode of The Bill.

On 5 August 2008, Maxwell appeared in an episode of Daily Cooks Challenge.

On 7 March 2009, Maxwell, alongside Patrick Robinson, participated in Let's Dance for Comic Relief. They danced to Riverdance.

On 27 February 2010, she took part in an episode of All Star Family Fortunes.

On 30 April 2011, Maxwell was a participant on ITV's Sing If You Can.

On 7 November 2012, Maxwell was a contestant in All Star Mr & Mrs with her partner, Paul.

On 4 January 2013, Maxwell took part in a celebrity episode of The Million Pound Drop Live as a part of the Channel 4 mash-up evening along with Sherrie Hewson, Jane McDonald and Denise Welch.

On 28 December 2013, Maxwell took part in a celebrity edition of the ITV game show The Cube in a Loose Women special alongside Sherrie Hewson and Denise Welch. Together, they were defeated by The Cube, but took away £1,000, which they split between their three chosen charities.

On 3 May 2014, Maxwell appeared in a special Crime episode of Pointless Celebrities and, on 14 April 2018, in another episode, alongside fellow cast member of The Bill Trudie Goodwin.

On 15 January 2022, Maxwell appeared in an episode of Casualty, "She's My Baby", playing Alison.

On 1 February 2024, she appeared in an episode of The Madame Blanc Mysteries, playing Nancy.

== Personal life ==
In April 2009, during an appearance on The Paul O'Grady Show, Maxwell revealed the deciding factor in her leaving The Bill was the long hours worked and that she had suffered two miscarriages during 2008. She also said her friend and co-star Roberta Taylor had convinced her to leave the show for the sake of her health.

On 28 February 2012, just before a leap day (which would be the traditional day for a woman to propose), she proposed to her long-term partner, Paul Jessup, with whom she has been in a relationship since 1997. She and Jessup have one daughter together, who died unexpectedly on 9 November 2026, at the age of 27. The couple married in 2014.

== Filmography ==
=== Film ===
Year	Title	Role	Notes
1982	Remembrance	Girl at disco	Minor Role
1982	The Dark Crystal	Kira	Supporting Voice Role
2006	Free Jimmy	Lise	Voice on English version
2020	Jeepers Creepers	Fantasy Lover	Supporting Voice Role

=== Television ===
Year	Title	Role	Notes
1976	The Many Wives of Patrick	Katrice Waddilove	Episode: "Why Not Tonight, Josephine?"
1977	Television Club	Vicky	3 episodes
1978	Grange Hill	Schoolgirl (uncredited)	3 episodes
1981	Keep It in the Family	Walk-on (uncredited)	Episode: "A Game of No Chance"
1984	The Hello Goodbye Man	Elke	Episode: "#1.3"
1984	Danger: Marmalade at Work	Maggie	Episode: "What the Butler Saw"
1985	The Tripods	Zerlina	2 episodes
1985	The Gender Gap	Alison Maitland	Television film
1985	The Benny Hill Show	Hill's Angel (uncredited)	13 episodes
1985–1986	No Limits	Herself – Presenter	10 episodes
1987–1991	The Les Dennis Laughter Show	Various	32 episodes
1988	I've Got a Secret	Herself – Guest	Episode: "#3.1"
1988	Life Without George	Trudy	Episode: "#2.1"
1988–1989	The Noel Edmonds Saturday Roadshow	Herself	5 episodes
1988–1989	Blankety Blank	Herself	3 episodes
1988–1989	The Joe Longthorne Show	Various	3 episodes
1989	Carrott Confidential	Various	Episode: "#3.3"
1989	The Satellite Show	Various	13 episodes
1989	Family Fortunes	Cinders	Episode: "Celebrity Christmas Special"
1990	That's Showbusiness	Herself – Panellist	2 episodes
1990	The Russ Abbot Show	Various	13 episodes
1990	The Paul Daniels Magic Show	Andy Pandy Narrator (voice)	Episode: "#11.5"
1990–1991	Wogan	Herself – Guest	3 episodes
1990–1992	The Russ Abbot Show	Various	13 episodes
1991	The Lisa Maxwell Show	Various	6 episodes
1991	Des O'Connor Tonight	Herself	Episode: "#14.9"
1991	Telly Addicts	Herself	Episode: "Telly Addicts vs. Telly Stars"
1992	Noel's House Party	Herself	Episode: "#1.7"
1992	Bottom	Lilly Linneker	Episode: "Digger"
1993	Comedy Playhouse	Mojo	Episode: "Once in a Lifetime"
1993	Acapulco H.E.A.T.	Vivian Quail	Episode: "Code Name: Strange Bedfellow"
1993	Celebrity Squares	Herself	Episode: "#5.3"
2001	The Bill	Denise Stubbs	Episode: "Long Shadows: Part 1"
2001–2002	In Deep	Pamela Ketman	14 episodes
2002	Get Carman: The Trials of George Carman QC	Gillian Taylforth	Television film
2002–2009	The Bill	DS / Acting DI / DI Samantha Nixon	Recurring role. 280 episodes
2003	Murder Investigation Team	DI Samantha Nixon	Episode: "Moving Targets"
2003	This Is Your Life	Herself	Episode: "Lisa Maxwell"
2004	Stars in Their Eyes	Doris Day	Episode: "Soap Stars Special 3"
2004	GMTV	Herself – Guest	2 episodes
2004	Who Wants to Be a Millionaire?	Herself – Contestant	Episode: "Celebrity Special"
2005	Comic Relief Does Fame Academy	Herself	Episode: "#2.3"
2005–2007, 2016	The Wright Stuff	Herself – Guest Panellist	4 episodes
2006	The Sharon Osbourne Show	Herself – Guest	Episode: "#1.22"
2007	Celebrity Supermarket Sweep	Herself – Contestant	Episode: "#1.5"
2008	TV Burp	Herself – Guest	2 episodes
2009	The All Star Impressions Show	Sugababe #2 / Barbara Windsor	Television Special
2009	The Paul O'Grady Show	Fairy Rosebud	Episode: "Christmas Pantomime"
2009	Hell’s Kitchen	Herself	Episode: "#4.11"
2009–2014	Loose Women	Herself – Panellist	Show regular. 425 episodes
2010	All Star Family Fortunes	Herself – Contestant	Episode: "Lisa Maxwell vs. Duncan Bannatyne"
2011	71 Degrees North	Herself – Contestant	Episode: "#2.1"
2011	Just Rosie	Herself	Television film
2012	All Star Mr & Mrs	Herself – Contestant	Episode: "#4.10"
2013	The Cube	Herself – Contestant	Episode: "Celebrity Special"
2013	EastEnders	Naomi	Episode: "#1.4719"
2014−2024	Pointless Celebrities	Herself – Contestant	4 episodes
2015	Celebrity Mastermind	Herself – Contestant	Episode: "#14.7"
2016−2017	Hollyoaks	Tracey Donovan	Recurring guest role. 24 episodes
2017	Celebrity Eggheads	Herself – Contestant	Episode: "The Cliffhangers"
2018	Celebrity MasterChef	Herself – Contestant	3 episodes
2018, 2020, 2022	Lorraine	Herself – Guest	3 episodes
2022	Casualty	Alison Madbury	Episode: "She's My Baby"
2023	The Weakest Link	Herself – Contestant	Episode: "#3.2"
2024	The Madame Blanc Mysteries	Nancy	Episode "Kidnap"

== Theatre credits ==
Year	Title	Role	Notes
1988–1989	Goldilocks and the Three Bears	Goldilocks	His Majersty’s Theatre, Aberdeen
1989–1990	Goldilocks and the Three Bears	Goldilocks	Congress Theatre, Eastbourne
1994/1995	Aladdin	Aladdin	Grand Opera House, York
1995	Grease	Marty	Dominion Theatre
1998	Boogie Nights	Debs	Savoy Theatre
2012	Chicken	Lena	Trafalgar Studios
2016	End of the Rainbow	Judy Garland	UK tours
2019	Calendar Girls	Celia	UK tours
2022	Judy: No Place Like Home	Judy Garland	Lyric Theatre, London
2024–2025	Aladdin	Professor Bellatrix Bottomburgh	Norwich Theatre Royal, Norwich
