= September Song (TV series) =

British TV sitcom (1993–1995)

- Written by: Ken Blakeson; Tom Mennard
- Directed by: David Richards; Graeme Harper
- Starring: Russ Abbot; Michael Williams
- Country of origin: United Kingdom
- Original language: English
- No. of series: 3
- No. of episodes: 20

Production
- Running time: 60 minutes
- Production company: Granada Television

Original release
- Network: ITV
- Release: 1 March 1993 – 21 March 1995

September Song was a British bittersweet comedy-drama series, originally broadcast on the ITV channel in the United Kingdom. The drama unfolded over three series broadcast from 1 March 1993 to 21 March 1995 and starred comedian and actor Russ Abbot, in one of his first 'straight' television roles, as recently widowed ex-teacher Ted Fenwick, opposite Michael Williams as Billy Balsam, an old school comedian and performer and longtime friend of Ted.

== Cast ==
- Russ Abbot as Ted Fenwick
- Michael Williams as Billy Balsam
- Michael Angelis as Arnie
- Susan Brown as Cilla
- Diana Quick as Katherine Hillyard
- Rebecca Callard as Vicky
- Frank Windsor as Cyril Wendage
- Diane Keen as Connie French
- Tenniel Evans as Sir Edward Parkinson-Lewis
- Eileen Page as Lady Emily Parkinson-Lewis
- Matt Patresi as Tom Walker
- George Savvides as Yannis Alexiou
- Julie Peasgood as Roxy

== Series overview ==
| Series | Episodes | Originally released | |
| Series | Episodes | First released | Last released |
|---|---|---|---|
| 1 | 6 | 1 March 1993 | 5 April 1993 |
| 2 | 7 | 1 March 1994 | 13 April 1994 |
| 3 | 7 | 31 January 1995 | 21 March 1995 |

== Episodes ==
=== Series 1 (1993) ===
| No. overall | No. in series | Title | Airdate |
|---|---|---|---|
| 1 | 1 | "Episode 1" | 1 March 1993 |
| 2 | 2 | "Episode 2" | 8 March 1993 |
| 3 | 3 | "Episode 3" | 15 March 1993 |
| 4 | 4 | "Episode 4" | 22 March 1993 |
| 5 | 5 | "Episode 5" | 29 March 1993 |
| 6 | 6 | "Episode 6" | 5 April 1993 |

=== Series 2 (1994) ===
| No. overall | No. in series | Title | Airdate |
|---|---|---|---|
| 7 | 1 | "Episode 1" | 1 March 1994 |
| 8 | 2 | "Episode 2" | 8 March 1994 |
| 9 | 3 | "Episode 3" | 15 March 1994 |
| 10 | 4 | "Episode 4" | 22 March 1994 |
| 11 | 5 | "Episode 5" | 30 March 1994 |
| 12 | 6 | "Episode 6" | 6 April 1994 |
| 13 | 7 | "Episode 7" | 13 April 1994 |

=== Series 3 (1995) ===
| No. overall | No. in series | Title | Airdate |
|---|---|---|---|
| 14 | 1 | "Episode 1" | 31 January 1995 |
| 15 | 2 | "Episode 2" | 7 February 1995 |
| 16 | 3 | "Episode 3" | 14 February 1995 |
| 17 | 4 | "Episode 4" | 28 February 1995 |
| 18 | 5 | "Episode 5" | 7 March 1995 |
| 19 | 6 | "Episode 6" | 14 March 1995 |
| 20 | 7 | "Episode 7" | 21 March 1995 |
