= John Martin (comedian) =

British comedian, writer and author (born 1962)

John Martin (born 29 September 1962) is a British comedian, author and writer.

== Comedian ==
Born on 29 September 1962 in Liverpool, England, John Martin is a comedian and the UK's first Government-sponsored comedian. He received £40 weekly under the enterprise allowance scheme. Martin's clean and fresh comedy has taken him on a global tour.

Having dedicated years to crafting comedic material, Martin has notably contributed to the repertoires of comedy luminaries such as Ken Dodd, Jimmy Tarbuck, and Bob Monkhouse. His writing prowess extends to prestigious events like the Royal Variety Performance and National Lottery. Martin has graced television screens, making memorable appearances on ITV's Today With Des & Mel. His comedy has earned admiration from none other than Sir Ken Dodd, who, on ITV's Parkinson, recognized Martin as a "marvelous comedian" and declared him his personal favorite in the contemporary comedy scene.

== Author ==
As a history enthusiast and researcher, Martin has authored three books inspired by his passion for history. These works, entitled "Ambushed - Six Bloody Chapters in History","Ambushed 2 - Six More Bloody Chapters in History", and "The Mirror Caught the Sun: Operation Anthropoid 1942" shift into distinct narratives. Martin has travelled extensively on the trail of the topics he has written about. During lockdown, Martin also wrote another book featuring the tough, early days of becoming a comedian and about his time with Ken Dodd entitled "I Want To Be A Comedian, Mr. Tarbuck".,"I Want To Be A Comedian, Mr. Tarbuck"
