= Martin Daniels =

English magician entertainer, and television and radio presenter

- Born: 19 August 1963 (age 62)
- Occupation: Magician
- Father: Paul Daniels

Martin Daniels (born 19 August 1963) is an English magician, and television and radio presenter.

One of the magician Paul Daniels' sons, Martin Daniels appeared regularly on his father's television shows. His subsequent television roles include presenting two series of Game for a Laugh and Lingo. He also appeared in five series of The Les Dennis Laughter Show. He has performed five times on the Children's Royal Variety Show and is a member of the Grand Order of Water Rats, which is the oldest and most exclusive theatrical fraternity in the world.

After opening a club in the United States in 1989 he was declared bankrupt four years later. He has since worked in radio, presenting a show for BBC Radio Lincolnshire, appeared in pantomime, and performed magic on stage.
