= No Limits (British TV series) =

- No Limits title card
- Created by: Jonathan King
- Presented by: Jeremy Legg; Lisa Maxwell; Tony Baker; Jenny Powell
- Country of origin: United Kingdom
- Original language: English
- No. of series: 4

Production
- Running time: 60 minutes
- Production company: BBC North West

Original release
- Network: BBC2
- Release: 30 July 1985 – 22 December 1987

No Limits is a television programme, shown on BBC2 over four series between 1985 and 1987. The idea was created by Jonathan King for Channel 4 as a way to introduce new presenters and was featured in his newspaper column of the time in The Sun to seek applicants. He then moved the project, before it began, to BBC2 which was broadcasting his Entertainment USA series. It was broadcast in an early-evening slot on Tuesdays at 6pm. The show's logo was a roadsign with a red ring and a black dash.

The show was presented in its first series by Jeremy Legg and Lisa Maxwell, and for the remaining three series by Tony Baker and Jenny Powell. The presenters regularly took part in stunts such as jetbiking.

In its final series, in addition to Baker and Powell, presenters were chosen from around the country to represent different regions. Terry Vaughan and Linda Huntley represented the Southeast region.

== Overview ==
Each week the show was set in a different town or location, and, as well as pop videos, had its own specially made videos about that location and some things about which the place was famous. Each music track ran for 90 seconds so as to appeal to viewers who liked them without alienating those who didn't. It exposed and helped break many unknown songs. The theme tune was Sex Appeal by Jonathan King. The show included both UK and US chart countdowns. At its peak, the series was the top-rated show on BBC2 and had up to six million weekly viewers.
