= The Russ Abbot Show =

British TV sketch comedy series (1980–1996)

- Also known as: Freddie Starr's Variety Madhouse (1979); Russ Abbot's Madhouse (1980-1985)
- Starring: Freddie Starr (1979); Russ Abbot (1980 onwards)
- Opening theme: "Livin' It Up" performed by Russ Abbot (1982-1985) "Songs of Joy" performed by Russ Abbot (1986–1991) "Songs of Joy" (instrumental) (1990, 1994–1996)
- Ending theme: "Livin' It Up" performed by Russ Abbot (1982-1985) "Songs of Joy" performed by Russ Abbot (1986–1991) "Songs of Joy" (instrumental) (1990, 1994–1996)
- Country of origin: United Kingdom
- Original language: English

Production
- Running time: 30 mins
- Production companies: LWT (1979–1985); BBC (1986–1991); Granada Television (1994–1996)

Original release
- Network: ITV
- Release: 27 October 1979 – 5 October 1985
- Network: BBC One
- Release: 26 May 1986 – 29 November 1991
- Network: ITV
- Release: 5 September 1994 – 26 December 1996

The Russ Abbot Show is a British television sketch comedy series which in 1980 onwards stars Russ Abbot and ran for 17 years on television before moving over to Radio 2 for a further five years.

== History ==
The series originated as The Freddie Starr Variety Madhouse; with Russ Abbot, Mike Newman, Toni Palmer, Norman Collier and Bella Emberg. After one series in 1979, Freddie Starr left and the show was repackaged as Russ Abbot's Madhouse premiering on 12 April 1980, with Liz Smith, Dustin Gee, Nicky Croydon and Billy Hartman joining the cast.

From the 1981 series there was a major cast upheaval, with many of the cast being replaced, with the new lineup being Dustin Gee, Bella Emberg, Susie Blake, Sherrie Hewson, Jeffrey Holland, Patti Gold, and Michael Barrymore. Les Dennis joined in Series 3 and Michael Barrymore left in Series 4.

In 1986 the series was transferred over to the BBC, where it was renamed The Russ Abbot Show, and featured Dennis, Emberg, Hewson, Holland, Suzy Aitchison, Tom Bright, Maggie Moone, Paul Shearer, and Lisa Maxwell. In 1991 allegedly the BBC was heard to announce at the Montreux Television Festival that Abbot no longer represented what the audience wanted to see on their screens and the series transferred to ITV.

After the final television series in 1996, the series moved to BBC Radio 2 for 50 episodes from November 1997 to February 2002.

=== Format ===
The series showcased Abbot's talents as an all round entertainer and included characters such as Basildon Bond, a James Bond parody; 'Cooperman', a cross between Tommy Cooper and Superman; and C.U. Jimmy, a virtually unintelligible, red-headed, kilt-wearing Scotsman. The programme attracted millions of viewers weekly. The show was popular amongst younger viewers, prompting two annuals to be published in 1982 and 1983. The annuals featured comic strips based on popular characters Abbot had created in the various series of the show. It was also notable for its "Tears of laughter" theme song, which played at the start and end of the show. The stop-motion animated titles were produced by 3 Peach Animation.

== Freddie Starr's Variety Madhouse ==
- Series 1: 27 October – 1 December 1979. 6 Episodes

== Russ Abbot's Madhouse ==
- Series 1: 12 April – 31 May 1980. 7 Episodes
- Series 2: 13 June – 1 August 1981. 8 Episodes
- Series 3: 17 July – 21 August 1982. 6 Episodes
- Series 4: 23 April – 28 May 1983. 6 Episodes
- Series 5: 22 October – 26 November 1983. 6 Episodes
- Series 6: 30 June – 4 August 1984. 6 Episodes
- Series 7: 31 August – 5 October 1985. 6 Episodes

=== Specials ===
1. Russ Abbot and a Show of his Very Own: 2 Jan 1981
2. Russ Abbot's Christmas Madhouse: 26 Dec 1981
3. Russ Abbot's Madhouse Annual: 7 Nov 1982
4. Russ Abbot's Hogmanay Lighthouse: 31 Dec 1982
5. Russ Abbot's Christmas Madhouse: 22 Dec 1984
6. Russ Abbot's Summer Madhouse: 29 June 1985

== The Russ Abbot Show ==
Eight series were made of The Russ Abbot Show, between 1986 and 1996.

=== BBC series ===
- Spring special: 26 May 1986
- Series 1: 13 September – 25 October 1986: 8 Episodes
- Christmas special: 25 December 1986
- Series 2: 12 September – 31 October 1987: 8 Episodes
- Christmas special: 25 December 1987
- Series 3: 3 September – 22 October 1988: 8 Episodes
- Christmas special: 25 December 1988
- Series 4: 2 September – 18 November 1989: 12 Episodes
- Christmas special: 25 December 1989
- Series 5: 1 September – 17 November 1990: 12 Episodes
- Christmas special: 26 December 1990
- Series 6: 6 September – 29 November 1991: 12 Episodes

=== ITV series ===
- Series 7: 5 September – 17 October 1994: 7 Episodes
- Series 8: 10 July – 21 August 1995: 7 Episodes
- Christmas Special – 26 December 1996
