= Game for a Laugh =

British light entertainment television series

- Genre: Light entertainment
- Presented by: Jeremy Beadle; Henry Kelly (1981–1983); Matthew Kelly (1981–1983); Sarah Kennedy (1981–1983); Martin Daniels (1985); Rustie Lee (1985); Lee Peck (1985); Debbie Rix (1985)
- Narrated by: Robin Houston
- Theme music composer: Laurie Holloway
- Country of origin: United Kingdom
- Original language: English
- No. of series: 5
- No. of episodes: 60

Production
- Running time: 60 minutes (inc. adverts)
- Production company: LWT

Original release
- Network: ITV
- Release: 26 September 1981 – 23 November 1985

Related
- Beadle's About; Surprise, Surprise

Game for a Laugh is a British light entertainment programme which ran for fifty-six editions and four specials between 26 September 1981 and 23 November 1985, made by LWT for the ITV network.

== Description ==
The show revolved around a variety of practical jokes, either in game-type formats played out within the studio or as often elaborate set-ups on unsuspecting members of the public, either studio-based or shot on location. Studio games included the Dunk Tank (the victim would be lowered into a tank of water) and Pie Chair (a volunteer would be pied when answering a question wrong.) Other games would involve couples from the audience and climaxed with the woman throwing a custard pie at her husband or boyfriend, giggling mischievously at her handiwork and being allowed to escape without even the suggestion of payback. Each segment would end with the victim being made aware of the joke by a presenter, who would then announce that the person had proved to be "game for a laugh".

== Origins ==
It has been said that the original format was called Gotcha and was designed as a BBC show to be presented by Paul Daniels, David Copperfield (the British comedian) and Pamela Stephenson. The pilot show was rejected, allegedly, for being 'too vulgar'. Jeremy Beadle then rewrote the format, with producer Michael Hill in the United States.

According to the show's original producer, Brian Wesley, in his 1982 book on the series, "The Game for a Laugh birthplace was the Hollywood office of producer Michael Hill." Jeremy Beadle and Hill's Los Angeles-based television production company Hill-Eubanks Group envisaged a show in which "the people were the stars". Hill developed the eventual show with Beadle and with Jeremy Fox, then head of London-based Action Time, and the son of BBC television executive Sir Paul Fox. Fox then presented the format to LWT. Jeremy Fox also brought to the show a wealth of stunts from Truth or Consequences, a show created by Ralph Edwards Productions in Hollywood from whom LWT bought the rights. At LWT, Head of Light Entertainment Alan Boyd put the finishing touches to it.

== Production ==
The hosts for its first few series were Beadle, Matthew Kelly, Henry Kelly (no relation) and Sarah Kennedy. When both Kellys and Kennedy left, the hosts were Jeremy Beadle, Martin Daniels (the son of Paul Daniels), Rustie Lee and Lee Peck. Debbie Rix replaced Rustie Lee for the final series.

The series had two spin-offs – Surprise, Surprise, which was designed by Alan Boyd to comprise the 'surprising', bizarre and humorous 'real people' elements from Game For a Laugh, and used largely the same product team. The second was Beadle's About which was based mainly around the elaborate on-location pranks played on unsuspecting members of the public.

== Catchphrase ==
The series' catchphrase was spoken by the four presenters at the end of the show – "Join us again next week when we very much hope you'll be..." then each of the four would intone, one by one:

Henry – "Watching us..." Sarah – "Watching you..." Matthew – "Watching us..." Jeremy – "Watching you...." (all) – "GOODNIGHT!"

== Presenters ==
Although the other presenters went on to other different types of show, Jeremy Beadle went on to present several more practical-joke type shows, including Beadle's About and became strongly identified with the genre in the UK.

Sarah Kennedy had started her career as a newsreader for BBC Radio 1. In the late 1980s she took over from Julian Pettifer as host of the ITV game show Busman's Holiday. She later presented early morning show The Dawn Patrol on BBC Radio 2 from 1993 until 2010.

Henry Kelly went on to present the BBC television pan-European quiz Going for Gold. He also was contracted to deliver TV-am weekend shows and also occasionally doubled on the weekday format. He later became a weekday morning presenter on the British radio station Classic FM before moving to Sunday mornings.

Matthew Kelly started his career as a stooge to Hylda Baker. Dressed in drag, he played Cynthia, whom Hylda was always telling to "be soon". He'd also go on to host You Bet! (replacing Bruce Forsyth) and Stars in Their Eyes (replacing Leslie Crowther, with Crowther having been injured in a road accident). He later returned to his roots as an actor.

== Parody ==
Game for a Laugh was spoofed in Not the Nine O'Clock News, in a sketch showing a man (played by Rowan Atkinson) returning home from work to find his wife brutally beheaded. He runs out into the street screaming before being approached by the crew who then shout "Game for a Laugh", whereupon they all share the joke, despite the fact that the man's wife is dead. This parody featured Pamela Stephenson (in the Sarah Kennedy role), who had expected to present the original BBC version of the series.

Comedian and eccentric Spike Milligan also parodied the show in his series There's a Lot of It About. The parody version is called "Laugh at a Cretin".

== Transmissions ==
=== Series ===
Series	Start date	End date	Episodes
1	26 September 1981	19 December 1981	13
2	11 September 1982	4 December 1982	13
3	10 September 1983	26 November 1983	12
4	20 January 1985	7 April 1985	11
5	12 October 1985	23 November 1985	7

=== Specials ===
Date	Entitle
25 December 1981	Christmas Special
11 April 1982	Easter Special
25 December 1982	Christmas Special
25 August 1984	The Best of Game for a Laugh

== International versions ==
On 4 February 1986 a German version premiered on Erstes Deutsches Fernsehen. It was called "Donnerlippchen" (a pun with the name of the host and the exclamation ″Donnerlittchen″ which is used like "wow") and captured Spiele ohne Gewähr which means "games without warranty". It was hosted by Jürgen von der Lippe and produced by Michael Hill. The last regular episode aired on 30 April 1988 and on 9 August 1988 the show ended with a "Best of".
