= Bella Emberg =

English actress (1937–2018)

- Born: Sybil Dyke; 16 September 1937; Brighton, Sussex, England
- Died: 12 January 2018 (aged 80); Morden, London, England
- Occupation: Actress
- Notable work: Doctor Who (1970, 1974, 2006)

Bella Emberg (born Sybil Dyke; 16 September 1937 – 12 January 2018) was an English actress whose television career spanned 60 years.

== Early life and career ==
Emberg was born on 16 September 1937 in Brighton, Sussex, and grew up wanting to be an entertainer. Her professional debut was in weekly repertory in Ryde, Isle of Wight, in the summer season of 1962, aged 25.

She appeared in television series such as The Benny Hill Show, Robin's Nest, Softly, Softly, Z Cars, Dawson Watch, Bear Behaving Badly and Grange Hill. Her best-known role was as a cast member in The Russ Abbot Show, in which she played superheroine Blunderwoman alongside Abbot's Cooperman character and appeared in 69 episodes in various roles. The show ran from 1980 to 1996, and at its peak attracted 18 million viewers.

Emberg also made a cameo appearance in Mel Brooks' film History of the World, Part I (1981). She made a guest appearance in the first episode of the revived version of The Basil Brush Show in 2002, and also featured in Doctor Who four times. From 2008 to 2010, she appeared as Barney Harwood’s fictional Aunt Barbara in Bear Behaving Badly on CBBC. In 1965, she had an uncredited appearance in Undermind, and other uncredited roles in the 1970s Third Doctor serials Doctor Who and the Silurians and The Time Warrior. In the revived series, she played Mrs Croot in "Love & Monsters". She filmed a second appearance as Mrs Croot for "The Runaway Bride", but this scene ended up on the cutting room floor.

Shortly before her death, she completed filming for In the Long Run, a Sky One comedy created by Idris Elba, which was broadcast in 2018.

== Death ==
Emberg's housemate found her collapsed at their home in London's Raynes Park on 12 January 2018, aged 80. Paramedics were unable to resuscitate her and she was found to have died from alcohol toxicity.

== Filmography ==
=== Film ===
Year	Title	Role	Notes
1969	The Siegfried Idyll	Maid in Biebrich	TV movie
1970	Morning Story	Mrs Shaw	TV movie
1972	Mr. Horatio Knibbles	Woman crossing road (uncredited)	Feature film
1978	Sammy's Super T-Shirt	Woman at door (uncredited)	Film
1981	History of the World, Part I	Baguette – The French Revolution	Feature film
1995	It Might Be You	Lady Caller	TV movie
2002	Fuel	Effie	Short film
2006	London Hospital	Mrs Hard Up	TV movie
2018	Dog Day	Evelyn	Short film

=== Television ===
Year	Title	Role	Notes
1961	Playbox	Policewoman	TV play series, 1 episode
1961	Our Mister Ambler		TV series, 1 episode
1961	Maigret		TV series, 1 episode
1964	Two of a Kind	Girl	TV series, 1 episode
1964	The Four Seasons of Rosie Carr		Miniseries, 1 episode
1965	R3	Wife	TV series, 1 episode
1965	ITV Play of the Week	Nurse Cary	TV play series, 1 episode
1965	Undermind	Volunteer at Flu Research Centre (uncredited)	TV series, episode: "Waves of Sound"
1965	Love Story	Frau Kellerman	TV series, 1 episode
1966	The Benny Hill Show	Various characters	TV series, 1 episode
1968	The Wednesday Play	Maid	TV play series, 1 episode
1968	Detective	Parker	TV series, 1 episode
1969	Softly, Softly	Secretary	TV series, 1 episode
1969	Father, Dear Father	Myrtle	TV series, 1 episode
1968, 1969	The Troubleshooters	Nurse / Hilda	TV series, 2 episodes
1969	Curry and Chips	Woman	TV series, 1 episode
1970	Villette	Marie Bruc	TV series, 1 episode
1970	The Roads to Freedom	Rose	Miniseries, 1 episode
1970, 1971	Doomwatch	St. Simons' Islander / Woman	TV series, 2 episodes
1971	Take Three Girls	Annie	TV series, 1 episode
1971	Cousin Bette	Cousin Judici	Miniseries, 1 episode
1971	The Goodies	Delia's Dancer	TV series, 1 episode
1972	Callan	Prison Officer	TV series, 1 episode
1972	Softly, Softly: Task Force	Prison Officer / Police Woman	TV series, 2 episodes
1973	Seven of One	Mrs Beckett	TV series, 1 episode
1973	...And Mother Makes Three	Woolworths Employee	TV series, 1 episode
1973	Hunters Walk	Mrs Flack	TV series, 1 episode
1973	Sykes	Passenger	TV series, 1 episode
1973	The Tommy Cooper Hour		TV series, 1 episode
1970, 1974	Doctor Who	Kitchen Maid / Nurse	TV series ("Doctor Who and the Silurians", "The Time Warrior")
1965–74	Z-Cars	Various characters	TV series, 4 episodes
1974	Father Brown	Museum Guide	TV series, 1 episode
1974–75	Man About the House	Traffic Warden / Podge's Mother	TV series, 7 episodes
1976	Lucky Feller	Woman	TV series, 1 episode
1976	George and Mildred	Woman in Park	TV series, 1 episode
1975–76	Within These Walls	Prison Officer	TV series, 5 episodes
1975–77	Doctor on the Go	Housewife / Miss McArthur	TV series, 2 episodes
1977	Big Boy Now!	Mrs Craig	TV series, 1 episode
1976–77	Yes, Honestly	Mrs Lawson / Woman in Pub	TV series, 2 episodes
1977	The Tomorrow People	Cleaning Lady	TV series, 1 episode
1977	The Foundation	Traffic Warden	TV series, 1 episode
1977	The Dick Emery Christmas Show: The Texas Connection	Cook	TV special
1978	Robin's Nest	Dirty Agnes	TV series, 1 episode
1978	Pennies from Heaven	Mrs Corder	TV series, 2 episodes
1978	Happy Ever After	Daphne	TV series, 1 episode
1978	The Birds Fall Down	Catherine	Miniseries, 2 episodes
1978–79	A Sharp Intake of Breath	Doris / Mrs Casey / Mrs Jackson	TV series, 4 episodes
1979	Spooner's Patch	The Mayor's Wife	TV series, 1 episode
1979	Rings on Their Fingers	Café Waitress	TV series, 1 episode
1979	Testament of Youth	St Jude's Staff Nurse	Miniseries, 1 episode
1980	Grange Hill	Cleaning Lady	TV series, 1 episode
1979–80	The Dawson Watch	Barbra Streisand / Mastermind Contestant	TV series, 3 episodes
1981	Now for Nookie	Woman	TV series, 1 episode
1971–82	The Benny Hill Show	Various characters	TV series, 15 episodes
1983	Let There Be Love	Miss Turnbull	TV series, 1 episode
1980–85	Madhouse	Various characters	TV series, 50 episodes
1987–90	The Les Dennis Laughter Show	Various characters	TV series, 14 episodes
1991	Billy Webb's Amazing Story	Mrs Frisby	TV series, 5 episodes
1986–94	The Russ Abbot Show	Blunderwoman / Various characters	TV series, 66 episodes
1996	The Ant & Dec Show		TV series, 1 episode
1997	Ant & Dec Unzipped		TV series, 1 episode
1997	The Lily Savage Show	Bella the Hun	TV series, 1 episode
1998	The Zig and Zag Show	Completely Horrible Woman / Serena	TV series, 2 episodes
2002	The Basil Brush Show	Auntie	TV series, episode 1
2002	Trial & Retribution	Mrs Fowler	TV series, episode 1
2006	Doctor Who	Mrs Croot	TV series, 1 episode: "Love & Monsters"
2008–10	Bear Behaving Badly	Aunt Barbara	TV series
2015	Pompidou	Bella	TV series, 3 episodes
2017–18	In the Long Run	Sheila	TV series, 3 episodes; final role
