= The Blunders =

- Title card
- Genre: Children's television series
- Created by: Colin Voisey; Haydn Morgan
- Written by: Ian Sachs
- Directed by: Ian Sachs
- Voices of: Frankie Howerd
- Narrated by: Frankie Howerd
- Composer: Chris Stuart
- Country of origin: United Kingdom
- Original language: English
- No. of series: 1
- No. of episodes: 30

Production
- Executive producer: Graham Clutterbuck
- Producer: Barrie Edwards
- Editor: Robert Dunbar
- Camera setup: Mark Taylor
- Running time: 5 minutes
- Production company: FilmFair

Original release
- Network: ITV (CITV)
- Release: 22 April – 4 June 1986

The Blunders is an animated children's television series co-produced by FilmFair and Central Independent Television, and broadcast on ITV in 1986. It was written and directed by Ian Sachs.

Colin Voisey and Haydn Morgan created the show's characters: Ma Blunder, Pa Blunder, Bobby Blunder, Baby Blunder, a cat named Zebra, a dog named Trouble, and an eye-patched bird named Patch. The comedian Frankie Howerd did all their voices. They all live together in the town of Villa Shambles, where they keep finding trouble because of their clumsiness. In the episode "The Blunder Family Tree", the Blunders find that their ancestors lived in the Roman Empire.

== Episodes ==
No.	Title	Original release date
1	"At the Circus"	22 April 1986
2	"Looking After Doris"	23 April 1986
3	"Central Heating"	24 April 1986
4	"Dog Bath"	25 April 1986
5	"House of Horror"	28 April 1986
6	"Dogs Don't Migrate"	29 April 1986
7	"Ye Blunder and Ye Dragon"	30 April 1986
8	"U.F.O. Spotting"	1 May 1986
9	"The Trouble with Trouble"	2 May 1986
10	"At the Manor"	6 May 1986
11	"On the Run"	7 May 1986
12	"Lucky"	8 May 1986
13	"Beau Blunder"	9 May 1986
14	"The Invisible Blunder"	12 May 1986
15	"Life of Spudnook"	13 May 1986
16	"School Report"	14 May 1986
17	"Bobby and the Prune Stone"	15 May 1986
18	"An Aunt in Time"	16 May 1986
19	"The Idle Idol"	19 May 1986
20	"Stage Struck"	20 May 1986
21	"Dog Diet"	21 May 1986
22	"The Burglar"	22 May 1986
23	"Never Kiss a Frog"	23 May 1986
24	"The Double Act"	27 May 1986
25	"The Blunder Family Tree"	28 May 1986
26	"The Genie"	29 May 1986
27	"The Bugs Meringue Gang"	30 May 1986
28	"Ma Goes Ape"	2 June 1986
29	"Invasion of the Burglar Snatchers"	3 June 1986
30	"On the Landscape"	4 June 1986

== Home releases ==
Castle Vision distributed episodes of the series on VHS videotape. Each tape features 10 episodes.

== See also ==
- The Stupids
