= Richard Hearsey =

British television producer (born 1953)

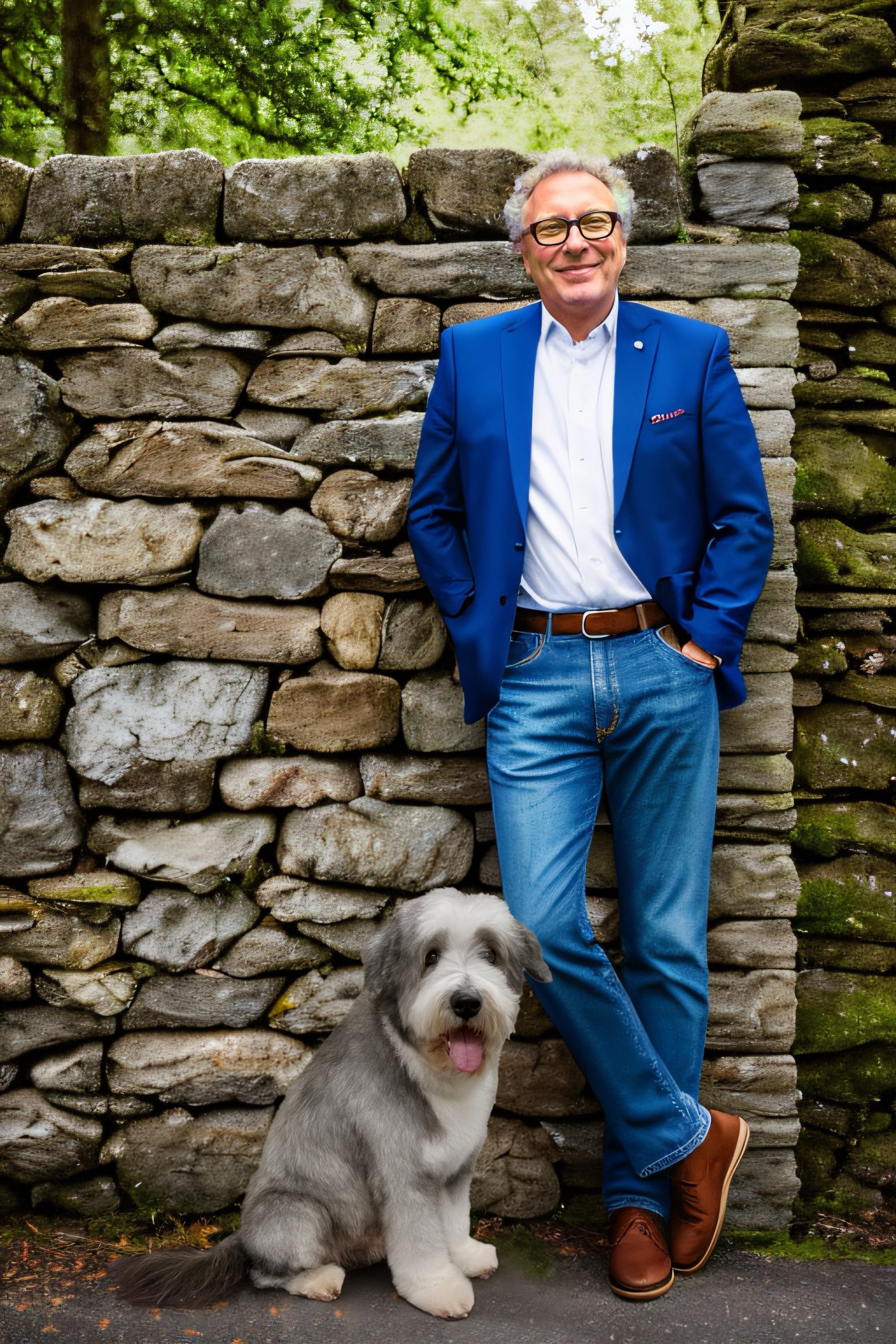
- Richard Hearsey & Buddy
- Born: Richard Anthony Hearsey; 18 July 1953 (age 73); Windsor, England
- Education: Bedfont Junior School; Hampton Court Grammar School; Weston-super-Mare Grammar School for Boys; Chelsea School of Art; The Polytechnic of Central London
- Occupations: Television producer, comedy writer, radio presenter, author, director
- Children: Katie, Oliver

Richard Hearsey is a British television producer. After working for BBC Television in the 1970s, he joined Southern Television where his work included News & Current Affairs, Light Entertainment, Children's Programmes and Drama. In the early 1980s he joined London Weekend Television where he produced various Television shows in the light entertainment department.

== Early life ==
Hearsey was born in Windsor, England. His father, Frank William Hearsey, was an engineer. As a child Hearsey lived in several different places. He was educated at Bedfont School in Bedfont, Middlesex, and later at Weston-super-Mare Grammar School for Boys in Somerset. He completed a foundation art course at Weston-super-Mare Technical College and studied at Chelsea School of Art for a year. Whilst at Chelsea he studied ceramics at the Royal College of Art under Eduardo Paolozzi. He then studied photographic arts at the Polytechnic of Central London, working during his vacations at the BBC and achieving a BA.

== Career ==
Hearsey was an assistant film editor at Southern Television between 1978 and 1981 on News and Current Affairs, Drama and Entertainment. He became a researcher and then a production journalist working on the children's series How and the award-winning magazine show, Day By Day, and also worked with Paul Smith.

Hearsey was a researcher, associate producer, director, producer, series producer and executive producer at ITV 1983–1988, where he worked on Tell The Truth, Babble, Game for a Laugh, Child's Play, Beadle's About, Surprise Surprise and You Bet!, In 1989 he worked at TVS in Southampton on Prove It, hosted by Chris Tarrant, and Tell The Truth hosted by Fred Dinenage. In 1990 he joined the new television production company, Noel Gay Television which was primarily making shows for the soon to be launched BSB. These shows included Up Yer News, Up Yer Festival, The Happening and The Last Laugh. He also worked on the Euro Disney Christmas Special with Chris Tarrant hosting.

Hearsey then moved to Talbot Television as a consultant producer and for the next few years was in charge of re-versioning and reproducing content for the international market. This included programmes from Mark Goodson, Bob Stewart and Monty Hall. In 1993, he set up Fremantle GmbH in Germany and took over the production of Play Your Cards Right, Family Feud, Let's Make A Deal and Divorce Court.

In 1994, Reg Grundy Productions offered Hearsey the position of Executive Producer and he produced the SKY telethon, Man O Man and Eureka. When Pearson Television bought Reg Grundy Productions, Hearsey was responsible for most of the entertainment output produced for the launch of Channel Five including 100%, Night Fever and Whittle. Subsequently, when Pearson bought Fremantle, Hearsey was appointed Head of Worldwide Development & Acquisitions.

In 1999, Hearsey started his own company, and produced two seasons of It's A Knockout for Channel Five. He later developed a comedy show for Jon Culshaw – Alter Ego, which later became an ITV series – The Impressionable Jon Culshaw. He also made a series of Fort Boyard with Tom Baker for Challenge TV.

From 2005, Hearsey worked as a consultant for a number of companies, and was creative director at MMTV in Bulgaria and TVA in Albania. He also managed production at Optimistic Entertainment. In 2008 Hearsey hosted a live two-hour weekly radio show – Hearsey's Half Hour on Play Radio. In late 2008 he accepted a teaching position in Asia. He has also continued to produce and direct AVPs, TV and cinema commercials, music videos and concerts.

== Recent work ==
In 2011 Hearsey produced and directed English/Norwegian boy band, A1's concert in Manila along with two music videos. In 2013 he produced, directed and edited the recording of their concert in Cebu, Philippines. Whilst in Asia, he completed a number of documentaries, television and cinema commercials and charity projects. He was also involved in the development of two comedy series and an entertainment show in the UK and he has recorded two concerts with Herman's Hermits, Bill Bailey's Trondheim show and John Cleese's Trondheim Show amongst many other productions.
