= Russ Abbot =

English musician, comedian and actor (born 1947)

- Born: Russell Allan Roberts; 18 September 1947 (age 79); Chester, England
- Occupations: Musician; actor; comedian
- Years active: Mid-1960s–2016
- Notable work: The Russ Abbot Show
- Spouse: Patricia Simpson (m. 1967)
- Children: 4

Russell Allan Abbot (born Russell Allan Roberts; 18 September 1947) is a retired English musician, actor and comedian. Born in Chester, he first came to public notice during the 1970s as the singer and drummer with British comedy showband the Black Abbots, later forging a prominent solo career as a television comedian with his own weekly show on British television.

Continuing his musical career as a solo artist, Abbot released several charting singles and albums. His career has continued with a shift into more mainstream serious acting in television shows, series, and stage productions.

== Career ==
As a drummer/backing singer, Abbot joined the Black Abbots (founded by Robert Turner) in Chester during the mid-1960s and they released several singles to modest chart success on minor labels in the early 1970s. The band only signed their first major recording contract in 1977, putting out a series of comedy singles and one live album (Abbot now taking lead vocals) before disbanding in 1980.

Subsequently, he appeared as a comedian, winning the 'Funniest Man on Television' award five times. Abbot appeared on the television show The Comedians under his birth name (Russ Roberts).

From 1980 onward, he released some albums as a solo artist and appeared in several TV series. The most successful of his music singles, "Atmosphere", did well in the UK top 10, peaking at No. 7 in 1985.

Russ Abbot's Madhouse and The Russ Abbot Show showcased his talents as an all-round entertainer, with impersonations and sketches, taking the BBC's primetime slot. These prompted two annuals to be published in 1982–83, featured comic strips based on the show's popular characters, plus some publicity photos of Abbot in a variety of guises, including his well-known James Bond satire featuring characters named Basildon Bond and Miss Funnyfanny (based on the fictional MI6 spy duo James Bond and Miss Moneypenny).

In January 1993, Abbot hosted an Elvis special of Stars in Their Eyes; this was originally to be presented by Leslie Crowther, who had suffered serious injuries in a car crash in his Rolls-Royce in October 1992. Abbot was brought in as a temporary host, and this was the only episode he hosted. Crowther was unable to return, and died in 1996; he was replaced by Matthew Kelly, who then hosted the show until 2004.

Between 1993 and 1995, Abbot starred as Ted Fenwick, alongside Michael Williams, in the ITV bittersweet comedy-drama September Song.

From 2000, Abbot played the lead role in the British national tour of Doctor Dolittle. Abbot's theatre roles include Alfred P. Doolittle in My Fair Lady (co-starring Amy Nuttall) at the Theatre Royal, Drury Lane and on tour; The Narrator in The Rocky Horror Show; Grandpa Potts in Chitty Chitty Bang Bang, at the London Palladium and Fagin in Oliver! (1998 and 2009).

From July 2007, Abbot took over the role of Roger De Bris in the UK tour of Mel Brooks' The Producers. In 2008, Abbot appeared at the Mayflower Theatre, Southampton as the Tin Woodman in the stage production of The Wizard of Oz.

In 2008, the BBC announced that Abbot would be joining the cast of Last of the Summer Wine, for the show's 30th series. He played Luther 'Hobbo' Hobdyke, who was the leader of a group consisting also of Entwistle, played by Burt Kwouk and Alvin, played by Brian Murphy.

In 2008, he guest-starred in The Sarah Jane Adventures episode "Secrets of the Stars" as a character called Martin Trueman, an astrologer who was possessed by the Ancient Lights. In 2009, Abbot played a pet shop owner in an episode of Casualty. This marked Abbot's second Casualty role – he previously appeared as a different character in a 1999 episode. He later parodied the character he played in Casualty when appearing in Harry Hill's TV Burp.

In 2009, when Rowan Atkinson fell ill during the original run of Cameron Mackintosh's West End revival of Oliver!, Abbot stepped into the role of Fagin for the second time. He again took the role after Griff Rhys Jones left the show on 12 June 2010.

Between 2014 and 2016 he co-starred in the BBC sitcom Boomers, after which he retired to Portugal.

In December 2020, University Radio Nottingham presenters George Scotland and Damian Stephen decided to start an internet campaign to get "Atmosphere" to number one for Christmas. The campaign, in the style of previous internet campaigns for Rage Against The Machine and AC/DC (both of whom charted within the Top 5) was endorsed by Abbot, as well as Paul Chuckle and Alistair Griffin, with "Atmosphere" highlighted as one of the contenders for Christmas Number One by the Official Charts Company.

== Personal life ==
Abbot has been married to Patricia Simpson since 1967. They have four children.

== Discography ==
=== Singles ===
- 1980 – "Space Invaders Meet the Purple People Eater" / "Country Cooper Man"
- 1982 – "A Day in the Life of Vince Prince" (UK No. 61, one week; re-entered at No. 75 two weeks later for one week)
- 1984 – "Atmosphere" (UK No. 7, in the chart for thirteen weeks)
- 1985 – "All Night Holiday" (UK No. 20, in the chart for seven weeks)
- 1985 – "Let's Go to the Disco" (UK No. 86)

=== Albums ===
- 1984 – Russ Abbot's Madhouse
- 1985 – I Love a Party – (UK No. 12)
- 1990 – Songs of Joy

== Filmography ==
Year	Title	Role	Notes
1973	The Comedians	Clown	Episode: "Music Hall"
1979	Freddie Starr's Variety Madhouse	Various	All 6 episodes
1980–1985	Russ Abbot's Madhouse	Various	All 50 episodes
1986– 1991	The Russ Abbot Show	Various	All 65 episodes
1993–1995	September Song	Ted Fenwick	All 20 episodes
1994–1995	The Russ Abbot Show	Various	All 14 episodes
1996	Married for Life	Ted Butler	All 7 episodes
1998	Noel's House Party	Detective Barret Holmes	Episode: #7.18
1999–2002	Dream Street	Narrator; Tech; P.C. Snooze; P.C. Snore; P.C. Nod Off	Voice; 59 episodes
1999	Casualty	Simon Lancaster	Episode: "Crossroads"
2000	Heartbeat	Stanley Leroy	Episode: "Child's Play"
2002	TV to Go	Various	Episode: #2.1
2003	My Family	Len	Episode: "It's a Window-Filled Life"
2005	Doctors	Billy Jenkins	Episode: "Doctor's Orders"
2006	Agatha Christie's Marple	CI Arthur Primer	Episode: "Sleeping Murder"
2007	Hotel Babylon	Mr. Poldark	Episode: #2.1
2007	The Last Detective	Jules Rendell	Episode: "A Funny Thing Happened on the Way to Willesden"
2008	The Sarah Jane Adventures	Martin Trueman	Serial: "Secrets of the Stars"
2008–2010	Last of the Summer Wine	Luther "Hobbo" Hobdyke	17 episodes
2009	Casualty	Malcolm Crowson	Episode: "Leave Me Standing"
2009	Harry Hill's TV Burp	Himself	Episode: #9.7
2012	Hacks	Bill Bentley	TV film
2012	Run for Your Wife	Hospital Patient	Film; Cameo role
2013	The Home Office	Don	TV pilot
2014–2016	Boomers	John	All 13 episodes
2015	Funny Valentines	Morris Roebuck	Episode: "Last Chance"
