= Worlds Beyond (TV series) =

British television anthology series

Worlds Beyond is a British television anthology series based on real-life supernatural experiences described in archival documents from the Society for Psychical Research that was broadcast on ITV from 1986 to 1988. A book was also released to accompany the series.

== Episode list ==
1. The Haunted Garden
2. Serenade for Dead Lovers
3. The Barrington Case
4. Captain Randolph
5. The Black Tomb
6. Home
7. Voice of the Gallows
8. The Eye of Yemanja
9. Guardian of the Past
10. Suffer Little Children
11. Undying Love
12. Reflections of Evil
13. Oliver's Ghost
