= Dustin Gee =

British comedian and impressionist (1942–1986)

- Gee performing on The Laughter Show
- Born: Gerald Harrison; 24 June 1942; York, England
- Died: 3 January 1986 (aged 43); Southport, Merseyside, England

Comedy career
- Medium: Television comedian; impressionist

Gerald Harrison (24 June 1942 – 3 January 1986), who performed under the name Dustin Gee, was a British impressionist and comedian, best known for his double act with Les Dennis.

== Early life and career ==
Born Gerald Harrison in York, on Wednesday, 24 June 1942, Gee left school at 15 and studied at art college. He took a job as an artist, working with stained glass, including at York Minster. He played in a rock band in the evenings called the Dare Devils, later 'Gerry B and the Hornets' and then 'Gerry B and the Rockafellas'. When the group disbanded, Gee became a compère, then a comedian. Gee was openly gay.

After 20 years in showbusiness, Gee got his television break on Who Do You Do?, an ITV showcase that gave opportunities for up-and-coming entertainers and impressionists. From April 1980 to July 1985, Gee was a guest on Russ Abbot's Madhouse. Les Dennis became one of the cast in 1982 and Gee and Dennis formed a double act with their impressions of Coronation Street's Vera Duckworth and Mavis Riley (played by Les Dennis).

On 15 April 1984, after Tommy Cooper suffered a massive heart attack whilst appearing on ITV's Live From Her Majesty's, Gee and Dennis were the act that was billed to follow him. They performed onstage whilst attempts were being made, backstage, to revive Cooper.

On 7 April 1984 Gee and Dennis began their own TV comedy show, The Laughter Show (retitled, Les & Dustin's Laughter Show for the third series). The first episode of a third series aired on Saturday 28 December 1985, the second episode was postponed two weeks after Gee died. The BBC cancelled the rest of the series, but it was resumed on request of Gee's family, on Saturday 18 January 1986.

== Illness and death ==
On 24 May 1985, Gee felt ill whilst on stage at the opening night of a summer season at the North Pier in Blackpool. He carried on, but after the show he was taken to Blackpool Victoria Hospital where a minor heart attack was diagnosed. Gee was told that he had dilated cardiomyopathy. He was discharged from hospital on 30 May and returned to the stage on 24 June, his birthday, to complete the run until the end of September, ignoring the doctors at the hospital who told him to rest for six months. That autumn, Gee and Dennis recorded the third series of their Laughter Show.

From 20 December 1985, Gee and Dennis appeared in pantomime at the Southport Theatre, Merseyside. At 8.15pm on 1 January 1986, Gee suffered a massive heart attack, while playing one of the ugly sisters in Cinderella, a role they had played two years before in Bradford. At the end of a scene, Gee clutched his left arm and when they reached their dressing room he said to Dennis "I think I am dying", collapsed and lost consciousness. Basil Soper, the show's company manager, was successful in reviving him. Gee was accompanied to Southport General Hospital, but on arrival, collapsed and fell unconscious.

The following day Dennis and Roger Edwards (Gee's PA) were by his bedside, Gee was unconscious and they both urged him to keep fighting and he raised a finger. Gee woke up at 7.50am the following day, asked for a cup of tea and some ice cream. According to his family members who were with him, he was "quite chatty", thanked them for coming, said they must see him in pantomime and asked where his watch was. He was sitting up for a while and it appeared as if he was going to recover. However, later that morning Gee lost consciousness again and his condition deteriorated. He died at 12.45 p.m.

Gee's funeral was held on 9 January 1986, at St Oswald's Church, at Fulford, York.
