= Dave Thompson (comedian) =

British comedian

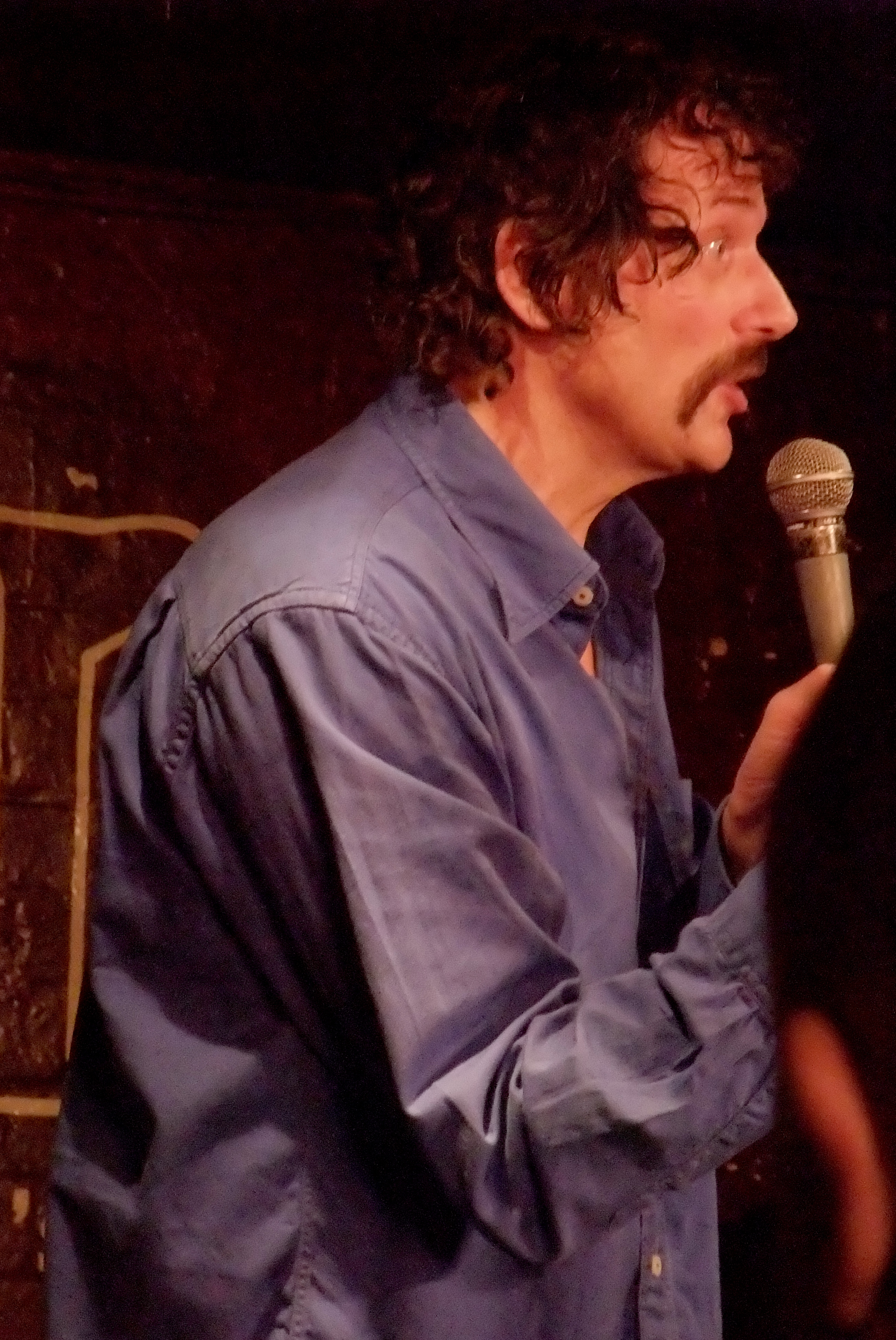
- Dave Thompson performing at Downstairs at the Kings Head, a stand-up comedy venue in Crouch End, North London
- Born: David Thompson; 30 June 1959 (age 66); Bristol, England
- Occupation(s): Actor, stand-up comedian, writer
- Years active: 1979–present
- Notable work: Teletubbies
- Website: www.davethompson.org.uk

David Thompson (born 30 June 1959) is an English actor, stand-up comedian and writer. He performed as Tinky Winky in the children's television series, Teletubbies, but was removed from the show after 70 episodes. He was told in a letter that his "interpretation of the role was not acceptable".

Thompson recounted bursting into tears upon learning the news of his termination. In interviews, he supposed that the dubbing of his voice, unlike the other actors, was an indication of dissatisfaction over his performance.

Thompson later appeared in the 2000 Ben Elton film Maybe Baby as Dave the Comedian/Mrs. Furblob. He also appeared in Harry Hill's live tour Hooves as the minor characters of the Horse, the ballboy and the Greek man who grabs Harry's neck. Thompson also made appearances in each night of Hill's Hooves tour.

== Filmography ==
=== Film ===
- Hardcore (1979) – Willem
- Area (1989) – Doctor
- Huge (2010) – Martin Luckhust
- The Harry Hill Movie (2013) – Brain Number Two
- Down the Back of the Sofa (2017) – Himself/host

=== Television ===
- Red Dwarf (1993) – Cowpoke
- Teletubbies (1997; Season 1, 70 episodes) – Tinky Winky
- Harry Hill (1998) – Fake Alan
- Screech Owls (2002) – Himself
- Time Gentleman Please (2000–2002) – Dave
- TV Burp (2004–2012) – Various characters
- Blessed (2005)

=== Production credits ===
==== Writer ====
- The Sketch Show (8 episodes)
- TV Burp (2 episodes)

== Books ==
- Sit-Down Comedy (contributor to anthology, ed Malcolm Hardee & John Fleming) Ebury Press/Random House, 2003. ISBN 0-09-188924-3; ISBN 978-0-09-188924-1
