= Dean Wilkinson =

English comedy writer

- Born: Dean Earle Wilkinson; 18 April 1967 (age 59); Guisborough, North Riding of Yorkshire, England
- Education: Bassleton Secondary School (now Thornaby Academy)
- Occupations: Writer, performer
- Years active: 1989–present
- Height: 6 ft 0 in (1.82 m)
- Website: https://www.deanwilkinson.net/

Dean Earle Wilkinson (born 18 April 1967) is an English comedy writer. He wrote SMTV Live and Chums for Ant & Dec, and scripted the Sony console game series LittleBigPlanet.

== Early life ==
Dean Earle Wilkinson was born in Guisborough.

== Writing career ==
Wilkinson began writing in 1989 for adult and children's comics including Smut and Zit. He was appointed editor of the anarchic children's comic Acne before releasing his own titled Fizog. His first TV scripts were performed by Charlie Chuck (Uncle Peter from The Smell of Reeves and Mortimer) on The James Whale Show.

Other breaks came on The Brian Conley Show, Six Pairs Of Pants and We Know Where you Live.

In 1997, Wilkinson provided many sketches for the penultimate series of Alas Smith & Jones. Greater success came when Chris Pilkington, then of Children's BBC, paired Wilkinson with the Geordie pop duo P.J. & Duncan, later more widely known as Ant and Dec, with whom he worked for seven years.

Wilkinson wrote The Ant & Dec Show, Ant & Dec Unzipped and several TV specials for the duo. The biggest success was the Saturday morning show SMTV Live which featured the sitcom Chums.

Wilkinson quit the show not long after Ant and Dec left to work for the BBC. Whilst working for the BBC he wrote 2 series of his sitcom Bad Penny starring John Shuttleworth actor Graham Fellows, and two series of his sketch show Stupid!, starring Marcus Bridgstock and Phil Cornwell. Wilkinson co-created and co-wrote the radio 4 show John Shuttleworth’s Open Mind. In 2006, the BBC commissioned to write his radio sketch show I'm an Alien Beam Me Off Here starring Blake's 7 star Paul Darrow.

Wilkinson co-wrote Harry Hill's Shark Infested Custard with Harry Hill in 2005.

Other TV work has seen him writing for BBC pre-school channel CBeebies's forthcoming Teacup Travels and Doodle Do as well as Casper’s Scare School, Aardman's Planet Sketch, links for Noel Edmonds on Are You Smarter than a 10 Year Old? and all 26 episodes of the Malaysian action comedy animation series Jinggo, produced by Backbone Entertainment.

== Console Games ==
Wilkinson has had much success writing for games and is the writer on all Sony’s LittleBigPlanet titles. He has also written for two of Team 17's Worms games, Worms Revolution which featured the voice of Matt Berry as Don Keystone and Worms Clan Wars with the voice of Katherine Parkinson as Tara Pinkle; both Berry and Parkinson can be seen in TV's The IT Crowd. Wilkinson has also written dialogue for games such as Driver: San Francisco, Trivial Pursuit, Castle of Illusion Starring Mickey Mouse and Disney's Fantasia: Music Evolved.

For LittleBigPlanet 3, Wilkinson returned as one of the writers, providing witticisms and puns for Stephen Fry. He also wrote the new villain's dialogue, voiced by Hugh Laurie. In addition, Wilkinson worked on general dialogue, quests, character names and bios, Popit puzzles, and general consistency in the LittleBigPlanet tone.

Wilkinson also wrote for and worked with Monty Python star John Cleese on the Sony brain training game Smart As.

== Books ==
In 2003, Scholastic published Wilkinson's first two novels, The Legend of Arthur King and Arthur King and the Curious Case of the Time Train.

For Penguin, Wilkinson has written the Plants Versus Zombies puzzle book and The Beano’s Prankipedia.

He also wrote the SMTV Live annual and has self-published Sarkylocks & The Three Bears and The Greenies.

For adults, Wilkinson has published The Tees Bally Fibber, the best of the spoof newspaper website he used to write and performed stories from on Teesside's TFM Radio, and Disturbing Bedtime Tales For Very Bad People.

For Apex Publishing, Wilkinson wrote The Classic Children’s Television Quiz Book, a thousand questions on classic children's TV.

MX Publishing published Wilkinson's supernatural kids comedy book series Sheerluck Versus The Paranormal.

Wilkinson writes comedy books for adults, such as Swearlot Holmes, under the name "Earle Wilkinson".

== Board Games ==
Wilkinson has designed the upcoming board game The Madcap League, based on his own comedy intellectual property and a Sherlock Holmes Monopoly game, commissioned by the Sherlock Holmes Museum, Baker Street, London.
