= Harry Hill's Fruit Corner =

Radio show broadcast on BBC Radio 4

- Cassette release (1995)
- Created by: Harry Hill
- Starring: Harry Hill; Steve Bowditch; Al Murray; Burt Kwouk; Matt Bradstock; Martin Hyder
- Country of origin: United Kingdom
- Original language: English
- No. of series: 4
- No. of episodes: 22

Production
- Running time: 30 mins.

Original release
- Network: BBC Radio 4
- Release: 11 November 1993 – 24 April 1997

Related
- Harry Hill; Fruit Fancies

Harry Hill's Fruit Corner is a radio show broadcast on BBC Radio 4 in the United Kingdom. It ran for four series between 1993 and 1997. The series starred Harry Hill, Al Murray, Burt Kwouk and Martin Hyder, and was the predecessor for Hill's breakthrough television series, Harry Hill.

== Background ==
Hill achieved his big breakthrough in August 1992 when he won the Perrier Award for Best Newcomer at the Edinburgh Festival Fringe. The show was commissioned shortly after he received the award. Fruit Corner ran for four series on BBC Radio 4. The first of these, in 1993, contained four episodes, but after the show's success, it returned for three further six episode runs in 1994, 1995 and 1997.

The show acted as a springboard for Hill's television career, and his Channel 4 show, Harry Hill, was similar in style and structure to Fruit Corner. A compilation of the best material from Series 1 to 3 was released on audio CD and cassette on 2 October 1995.

=== Synopsis ===
Hill hosted the show as himself, and each week was joined by a number of characters, including his big brother Alan Hill (Al Murray), his three-year-old adopted son, Alan Hill Jr. (Matt Bradstock), his parents, Jan and Tony Hill, and his grandmother, Nana Hill. Later series of the show often saw the family joined by Burt Kwouk.

The show also enjoyed a variety of other celebrity guests across its run, including, most notably, Ronnie Corbett and Rolf Harris.

The show used surreal humour as the basis for many of its jokes. Its presentation was very conversational, with each item tending to involve one or more members of the family. Later other recurring characters such as scientist Finsbury Park (Steve Bowditch) were included. Each programme was interspersed with surreal jokes from Harry, common ground for anyone familiar with his stand-up routines.

== Episodes ==
As well as the regular actors featured on the show, Phill Jupitus and Soo Drouet appeared solely in the first series; Phil Nice and Brenda Gilhooly appeared in both the first and second; Joanna Brooks appeared solely in the second; and Peter Serafinowicz appeared solely in the fourth. Edna Doré starred in at least first and fourth series.

A permanent fixture in both the third and fourth series was Burt Kwouk, who appeared as a guest in series two, and liked it so much that he returned frequently. The third series focused on the main cast, but still included other regular actors and celebrity guests.

=== Series 1 (1993) ===
- Episode 1 – Monks And Nuns (11 November 1993) – Guests: Bernard Bresslaw
- Episode 2 – Lords And Ladies (18 November 1993) – Guests: Jon Pertwee
- Episode 3 – Police And Thieves (25 November 1993) – Guests: The Beverley Sisters
- Episode 4 – Doctors And Nurses (2 December 1993) – Guests: Bob Holness

=== Series 2 (1994) ===
- Episode 1 – Elves And Pixies (17 November 1994) – Guests: Arthur Mullard
- Episode 2 – Judges And Janitors (24 November 1994) – Guests: Rolf Harris
- Episode 3 – Army And Navy (1 December 1994) – Guests: Anita Dobson
- Episode 4 – Minicab Drivers (8 December 1994) – Guests: Burt Kwouk
- Episode 5 – Dons And Dames (15 December 1994) – Guests: June Whitfield
- Episode 6 – Dog And Bone (22 December 1994) – Guests: Ronnie Corbett

=== Series 3 (1995) ===
- Episode 1 – Desmond Tutu Sings Motown (31 August 1995) – Guests: Raymond Baxter
- Episode 2 – Prince Charles Sings Musical Youth (7 September 1995) – Guests: Bill Pertwee
- Episode 3 – Jimmy Savile Sings The Cranberries (14 September 1995) – Guests: Stephen Lewis
- Episode 4 – The Fantasy Island Midget Sings Tina Turner (21 September 1995) – Guests: Melvyn Hayes & Stephen Lewis
- Episode 5 – Mike Read Sings Blur (28 September 1995) – Guests: Richard O'Sullivan
- Episode 6 – Desmond Tutu Sings Disney (4 October 1995) – Guests: Johnny Ball

=== Series 4 (1997) ===
- Episode 1 – Monks Chant The Ragga Hits (20 March 1997) – Guests: Todd Carty
- Episode 2 – David Bowie Sings The Instrumentals (27 March 1997) – Guests: Johnny Ball
- Episode 3 – Tom Baker Sings Meat Loaf (3 April 1997) – Guests: Lynne Perrie, Christopher Quinten
- Episode 4 – Chewbacca Sings Spandau Ballet (10 April 1997) – Guests: Richard Briers
- Episode 5 – Mariella Frostrup Sings Dionne Warwick (17 April 1997) – Guests: No featured guest.
- Episode 6 – Alec Guinness Sings Pulp (24 April 1997) – Guests: Jan Leeming

== Transmissions ==
=== Series ===
Series	Start date	End date	Episodes
1	11 November 1993	2 December 1993	4
2	17 November 1994	22 December 1994	6
3	31 August 1995	4 October 1995	6
4	20 March 1997	24 April 1997	6
