= What Are You Looking At? =

What Are You Looking At? was a 2007 BBC comedy show, hosted by Jimmy Carr and produced by Hat Trick Productions. It was a clip show looking back at the week's television. The pilot was recorded, starring Carr, and the BBC planned to make a full series. However, the programme was attacked for being too similar to ITV1 show Harry Hill's TV Burp and not commissioned for a series. The BBC claimed that, "Our show will be more spiky."
