= Funny Times (Harry Hill album) =

Studio album by Harry Hill
- Released: 29 November 2010
- Recorded: 2009–2010
- Genres: Comedy, pop
- Length: 45:43
- Label: Island
- Producer: Harry Hill

Singles from Funny Times
- 1. "I Wanna Baby" Released: 18 October 2010; 2. "SuBo" Released: 15 November 2010; 3. "Ken!" Released: 13 December 2010

Funny Times is the first comedy studio album released by the British comedian Harry Hill. It was released on 29 November 2010. The album was originally due to be entitled Sergeant Peppers II, but due to copyright issues, it was later retitled Funny Times. It is perhaps best known for the song "Ken!", about Ken Barlow, a character on the television soap Coronation Street played by William Roache.

== Critical reception ==
Adam Kennedy of the BBC wrote, "As a television personality, Harry Hill is a rare breed, entertaining the masses with unrestrained wackiness while sneaking more mischievous references below early evening watershed radars. His debut full-length musical foray pulls a comparable trick, obscuring occasionally caustic wit beneath surface silliness. Despite distancing Funny Times from his best-known Technicolor vehicle TV Burp, Hill himself admits the album envelops similar themes. That’s inevitable, given the former doctor’s devotion to dissecting the slowly decaying corpse of popular culture-slash-television. But certain targets warrant further ridicule beyond 30-second TV gags, selected here with deadly accuracy. The Disappointment Song demonstrates that knack pithily, ripping into Sarah Jessica Parker and co’s big screen excursions with barely-concealed zeal. Nobody is safe, either, from gardeners-turned-tedious chatshow hosts to family members.

"Expectedly random guests – ABC’s Martin Fry, William ‘Ken Barlow’ Roache, Bruce Forsyth – garnish moments between Hill's politely narked highs. And trusty newsreader John Craven announces the genuine peak: Never Be Holly Willoughby Symphony is a geeky timewaster's letter to the eponymous presenter, offering to take her out to a ludicrous array of family-friendly UK attractions. Essentially Eminem's Stan lectured in British etiquette, it pauses only to insult her "tiny" husband. Hill's eye for the ridiculous is tempered by completing rhymes that many musical comedians would only dare allude to. Nothing is left to the imagination in Phone Up Yer Mum certainly, Hill advising us "Be a good son and phone up yer mum, ‘Cos one day she’ll be dead", before trading off subtle nuances of such conversations with commendable attention to detail. Repeated spins will, naturally, send you barmier than Hill, particularly closing Brucie ballad I'm Not Anyone and flagship scally-dissing number I Wanna Baby. As a one-off trip through a madcap brain, however, Funny Times splits a few sides and then some."

== Singles ==
- "I Wanna Baby" was the first single released from the album on 18 October 2010. The video for the track was premiered on the date of release, at a total length of three minutes and thirty seconds. It shows Hill performing as Chantelle, the person around whom the song centres. "Chantelle" also appears in the video, played by an uncredited actress. The majority of the video is set on the exterior of a high-rise council estate. On 27 October, a behind-the-scenes look at the video was uploaded to YouTube. The track did not chart.
- "SuBo" was the second single released from the album, on 15 November 2010, exclusively via the Tesco Entertainment online store. Available exclusively as a download, the single contained a demo version of "Safe As Sheep" as the B-side. No official music video was released for the track, but the official audio video was uploaded to YouTube on 3 November 2010.
- "Ken!" was the third and final official single released from the album, on 13 December 2010. The music video for the track was premiered on 10 December, as part of Coronation Street: The Big 50, a special programme celebrating the show's 50th anniversary. The video shows Hill and Ken (William Roache) performing the song in a western bar, in and around a group of cowboys.

=== Music videos ===
- An animated music video for the album track "Nuggets Nocturne" was released on 4 November 2010. Filmed and animated by Ruth Barrett, the three-minute video has had more than 18,000 views as of 2023.
- A music video for the album track "Flatscreen TV" was released on 9 November 2010. The video has Hill portraying a number of television characters on his fingers, such as the stars of Coronation Street, Emmerdale, The Bill, EastEnders, You've Been Framed! and Harry Hill's TV Burp.

== Track listing ==
- The album's track listing was confirmed by HMV on 14 November 2010. All tracks were written, composed, produced and performed by Harry Hill.
1. "Happy Giftmas" (Intro) - 1:05
2. "I Wanna Baby" - 3:21
3. "Big Mag" (Interlude) - 0:53
4. "Ken!" (featuring William Roache aka Ken Barlow) - 3:29
5. "Phone Up Yer Mum" - 3:56
6. "Nuggets Nocturne" - 2:51
7. "Never Be Holly Willoughby Symphony" (featuring John Craven) - 4:11
8. "Subo" - 3:08
9. "Safe As Sheep" - 4:10
10. "This Guy's in Love With You" (featuring Martin Fry) - 4:35
11. "The Disappointment Song (Sex and The City)" - 2:55
12. "Alan Titchmarsh Song" (Interlude) - 1:11
13. "I Wish My Brother in Law's Voice Didn't Go Up at the End of Every Sentence" - 3:29
14. "Flat Screen TV" - 3:32
15. "I'm Not Anyone" (featuring Bruce Forsyth) - 4:57

=== Harry Hill.com Digital Bonus Content ===
- Physical copies of the album contained an exclusive code, which when entered into Hill's official website, unlocks a further 14 tracks to download for free.
1. "True" (featuring Martin Kemp) - 3:02
2. "Britishness Tests" - 4:18
3. "O.A.P. Idol (Part 1)" - 1:54
4. "(You're Love Keeps Liftin' Me) Higher and Higher" - 2:54
5. "Sunday Morning" (featuring Jan Leeming) - 3:48
6. "Winter Olympics Come To London" - 2:29
7. "O.A.P. Idol (Part 2)" - 2:32
8. "I Want to Break Free" - 3:25
9. "Interview with Ken Livingstone" (featuring Ken Livingstone) - 5:03
10. "Don't Go Changing" - 3:05
11. "Robbie Williams' Wives" - 3:40
12. "Born To Run" - 3:19
13. "O.A.P. Idol (Part 3)" - 2:18
14. "The Queen is Pregnant Song" - 3:39

=== iTunes Store digital bonus content ===
- Copies bought from the iTunes Store have a number of bonus music videos and featurettes.:
1. "Ken" - Video
2. "Nuggets Nocturne" - Video
3. "I Wanna Baby" - Video
4. "Flatscreen TV" - Video
5. "I Wanna Baby" - Behind The Scenes
6. "Harry on Benny Hill"
7. "Harry on Bruce Forsyth"
8. "SuBo" - Lyric Video
9. "Funny Times" - TV Advert
