= Kirsty Gallacher =

British TV presenter (born 1976)

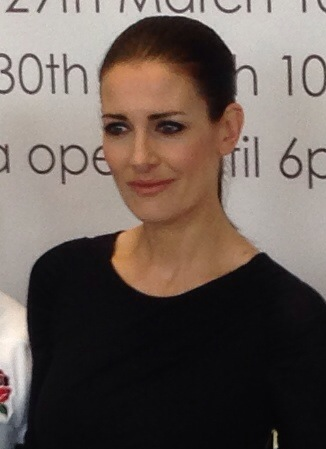
- Gallacher in 2014
- Born: Kirsty Jane Gallacher; 20 January 1976 (age 50); Edinburgh, Scotland
- Education: St. George's School England; London College of Fashion
- Occupations: Television and radio presenter, model
- Years active: 1998–present
- Known for: Sky Sports News; RI:SE; Ant & Dec's Saturday Night Takeaway; Gladiators (2008); GB News; Winner & presenter of The Games; Winner- two RTS Awards (TV and radio awards)
- Spouse: Paul Sampson (m. 2010; div. 2015)
- Children: 2
- Parent(s): Bernard Gallacher
- Relatives: Laura Brand (sister); Stephen Gallacher (cousin); Russell Brand (brother-in-law)

Kirsty Jane Gallacher (born 20 January 1976) is a British television presenter and model. She began her career at Sky Sports News in 1998 and hosted Kirsty's Home Videos, RI:SE and Simply the Best before returning to Sky Sports News from 2011–2018. From June 2021 until December 2021, Gallacher co-presented The Great British Breakfast on the news channel GB News.

== Early life ==
The daughter of Bernard Gallacher, a professional golfer and Ryder Cup captain, and Lesley Gallacher, Kirsty Gallacher was born in Edinburgh, Scotland. When her father got the job of professional at Wentworth Golf Club, they moved south to Virginia Water, England, when she was 18 months old. Gallacher and her younger brother and sister were raised on the Wentworth Estate, where their close neighbours included Bruce Forsyth. She was educated at Coworth Flexlands and St George's School in Ascot, Berkshire.

== Career ==
Approached by Mark Sharman, then deputy head of sport at Sky, at a Ryder Cup dinner, she began working as a production assistant in 1996, before moving on to the position of editorial assistant on Sky Sports.

She got her presenting break on Sky Sports News in 1998, and since then has been associated with many other sports shows such as 90 Minutes, Soccer Extra, Kirsty and Phil (on BBC Radio 5 Live) and Soccer AM.

From 2000 until 2004, Gallacher hosted the Sky One show Kirsty's Home Videos, a satellite equivalent of ITV's You've Been Framed! in which viewers send in home videos to be screened. In 2002, she presented the morning show RI:SE, and in 2004 began the show Simply the Best. Gallacher presented the All Star Cup on Sky1 in 2005 and on ITV in 2006. She has made guest appearances on They Think It's All Over and A Question of Sport. Gallacher presented Ant vs Dec – the popular strand on Ant & Dec's Saturday Night Takeaway.

In 2005, Gallacher won the third series of the popular Channel 4 reality television series The Games. She then presented the following years alongside Jamie Theakston. In December 2005, she released a DVD entitled Body Sculpt with Kirsty Gallacher in which she shows a variety of workouts. In July 2006, she co-presented the BBC reality TV show Only Fools on Horses.

In 2008, Gallacher presented the new version of Gladiators on Sky One alongside Ian Wright. She did not return for the second series.

On 30 August 2008, Gallacher appeared on Who Wants to Be a Millionaire? with Duncan Bannatyne.

She has also guest presented GMTV with Lorraine in August 2010 for two weeks and Lorraine on ITV Breakfast.

In May 2011, Gallacher returned to Sky Sports to present for Sky Sports News.

On 27 August 2015, it was confirmed that Gallacher would be taking part in the 2015 series of Strictly Come Dancing. On 5 September 2015, it was announced Gallacher would be paired with professional dancer Brendan Cole for the series. The couple were eliminated on week 6; finishing eleventh.

In May 2018, Gallacher announced she was leaving Sky Sports.

In 2018 Gallacher and Rachel Riley competed in the Celebrity Special of the Chase winning the highest amount of money in the history of the show, for UNICEF.

On 29 March 2021, it was announced that Gallacher would be joining GB News to present a breakfast programme on the channel. Gallacher left GB News in December 2021 after discovering she had a benign tumour in her inner ear canal which was causing tinnitus and she said that the early starts for the news channel were exacerbating her symptoms.

On 3 April 2021, she hosted for the first time on Smooth Radio, starting at 1:00 pm BST. On 6 January 2025, Gallacher started presenting the drivetime show on the relaunched Gold Radio.

== Awards and nominations ==
Gallacher was nominated for Best Newcomer at the Royal Television Society Television Sports Awards in 1998. She won Satellite/Digital TV Personality at the 2002 Television and Radio Industries Club Awards, and Kirsty's Home Videos won her the following year's Satellite/Digital Programme award in 2003. She also won a "Platinum Award" for Best Entertainment Programme at the 2002 Houston International Film Festival.

== Personal life ==
Gallacher is the cousin of golfer Stephen Gallacher. Her sister Laura Gallacher is married to Russell Brand.

Gallacher married rugby player Paul Sampson in 2010, with whom she has two sons born 2006 and 2010. The couple ended their relationship and divorced in August 2015.

At the end of February 2013 she was named patron of Hibernian Women.

She was convicted of drunk driving in 2017.

In April 2023, Gallacher completed the London Marathon in 5 hours, 35 minutes and 35 seconds; she had previously run the race in 2019.
