= Harry Hill's Shark Infested Custard =

UK television series

- Created by: Harry Hill; Dean Wilkinson
- Starring: Harry Hill; Joann Condon; Ronne Coyles; Dave Thompson; Siobhan Hayes; Jake Chaplin
- Country of origin: United Kingdom
- No. of series: 1
- No. of episodes: 13

Production
- Running time: 30 minutes
- Production company: Avalon Television

Original release
- Network: ITV (CITV)
- Release: 21 October 2005 – 13 January 2006

Harry Hill's Shark Infested Custard is a children's television series that was broadcast in the United Kingdom from 21 October 2005 to 13 January 2006. The show marked the first and currently only venture of comedian Harry Hill into children’s television besides Junior Bake-Off. The show later began airing on Cartoon Network in October 2011.

== Background ==
The series was produced by Hill's long-running production company, Avalon Television, and was initially broadcast on ITV between 2005 and 2006. Hill co-wrote the series with the comedian Dean Wilkinson.

The series was originally broadcast at 4:30 pm on Fridays on CITV, within the children’s programming slot on the ITV network. It co-starred Siobhan Hayes, Ronne Coyles, Dave Thompson and Joann Condon. The name of the show was derived from the punchline of the well known children’s joke: What’s yellow and dangerous? – Shark infested custard!

The show was deemed new territory for Harry Hill at the time, as prior to its broadcast he had never produced any television show intended for children. However, for many years Hill, whose comedy has always generally been free of smut and harsh language, had appealed to a large audience of all ages. Two books – Harry Hill's Whopping Great Joke Book and Harry Hill's Bumper Book of Bloopers were released in 2006 to tie in with the series.

=== Cancellation ===
Hill was quoted as saying that 13 episodes of the series were produced. However, after just six were broadcast, the first episode was rerun in December 2005, after which the series ended. The official website was removed shortly afterwards. The final seven episodes were eventually broadcast in 2006.

Hill later expressed some concern and disappointment over the post-production and editing of the series.

== Synopsis ==
In a very similar setup to his Channel 4 breakthrough series Harry Hill (1997), the show included various sketches, recurring jokes, musical numbers, a segment entitled Meet The Johnsons, in which Harry would invite any family with the surname Johnson onto the show, and a Multi-Coloured Swap Shop style game entitled Help The Aged.

The series also featured classic characters from Harry Hill, such as Stouffer the Cat and Harry’s son from his first marriage – ventriloquist doll Garry Hill. Several new characters were also introduced: Burly Caroline, Harry Hill Snr., Speed Camera Boy, a giant, and a musical genius called Evelynne Hussey. The self aware formulaic style continued with each show ending on a song as per Harry Hill.

=== Overview ===
The following blurb was used to synopsise the series when originally broadcast:

Families of Johnsons will flock to climb Harold Hill…… Got a family of Johnsons? Plastered celebrities will struggle to be recognised…… Natasha Kaplinsky, the tap dancing armadillo will defend her title in Harry’s Pet Idol…… Have you got a pet to challenge this thick skinned prima donna?.

This is a rare opportunity to watch bald men spell, to marvel at Evelynne’s wonderful instrument and to find a friend for Speed Camera Boy – if you’re very quick! In the studio, hundreds of 8 to 11 year olds will out the woman with the annoying laugh… banish vegetables that don’t look like Harry…. and if you’ve got a Nan, you too can have fifteen minutes of fame….

== Transmissions ==
Series	Start date	End date	Episodes
1	21 October 2005	13 January 2006	13
