= Funny Times =

Funny Times may refer to:

- Funny Times (newspaper), an American humor newspaper
- Funny Times (Harry Hill album), 2010
- Funny Times (Misty's Big Adventure album), 2007
