= Bad Penny =

Bad Penny may refer to:

== In aircraft ==
- "Bad Penny" (aircraft), a nickname for an Avro Lancaster involved in Operation Manna

== In media and entertainment ==
- "Bad Penny" (song), a song by Rory Gallagher
- Bad Penny (TV series), an English sitcom
- "Bad Penny Blues", a jazz piece by Humphrey Lyttelton
- "Bad Penny", a song by noise rock band Big Black on their 1987 album Songs About Fucking
- "The Bad Penny", an episode of the TV sitcom George and Mildred
- The Bad Pennies, the backing band of Jez Lowe
