= Harry Hill's Alien Fun Capsule =

- Genre: Comedy; Panel show
- Created by: Harry Hill
- Written by: Harry Hill
- Directed by: Geraldine Dowd
- Presented by: Harry Hill
- Country of origin: United Kingdom
- Original language: English
- No. of series: 3
- No. of episodes: 22

Production
- Executive producers: Murray Boland; Harry Hill; Danielle Lux
- Producer: Alan Thorpe
- Production locations: The London Studios (2017-2018); Pinewood Studios (2019)
- Editors: Steve Nayler; Mobashir Dar
- Running time: 30 minutes (including adverts)
- Production company: Nit Television

Original release
- Network: ITV
- Release: 2 March 2017 – 20 July 2019

Related
- Harry Hill's TV Burp

Harry Hill's Alien Fun Capsule is a British television comedy panel show created, written and presented by Harry Hill and produced by his company Nit Television for ITV. The series began on 2 March 2017 and follows Hill and a group of celebrity guest panelists trying to find funny things to convince an alien invasion that the earth is worth saving. A second series began on 14 April 2018. A third series of the show was commissioned by ITV and started on 8 June 2019. On 4 February 2020, it was confirmed that ITV had cancelled the programme.

== Format ==
The show revolves on Hill trying to fill an "alien fun capsule" with funny things so that aliens will not invade. Regular segments include "Local News Round-Up", where Hill and the guests sing a short song about strange headlines from the local news, Hill performing a short skit with 'Alan the Alien' to decide what the next round will be, a 'what happens next' segment, taken from You've Been Framed, where Hill shows a clip before the start of the ads and a song at the end of the show.

== Episodes ==
Series	Episodes	Originally released	
Series	Episodes	First released	Last released
1	7	2 March 2017	13 April 2017
2	8	14 April 2018	9 June 2018
3	7	8 June 2019	20 July 2019

=== Series 1 (2017) ===
No. overall	No, in series	Episode	Date	Panelist 1	Panelist 2	Panelist 3	Panelist 4
1	1	"Episode 1"	2 March 2017	Kelvin Fletcher	Sara Pascoe	Patrick Robinson	Josh Widdicombe
2	2	"Episode 2"	9 March 2017	Kathy Burke	Joe Lycett	Ainsley Harriott	Lorraine Kelly
3	3	"Episode 3"	16 March 2017	Mel Giedroyc	Bridget Christie	Eamonn Holmes	Judith Chalmers
4	4	"Episode 4"	23 March 2017	Sally Lindsay	Phillip Glenister	Joe Lycett	Sara Cox
5	5	"Episode 5"	30 March 2017	Ross Noble	David O'Doherty	Raleigh Ritchie	Gloria Hunniford
6	6	"Episode 6"	6 April 2017	Nina Wadia	Fay Ripley	Nish Kumar	Des O'Connor
7	7	"Episode 7"	13 April 2017	Various	Various	Various	Various

=== Series 2 (2018) ===
No. overall	No, in series	Episode	Date	Panelist 1	Panelist 2	Panelist 3	Panelist 4
8	1	"Episode 1"	14 April 2018	Sally Dynevor	Robert Peston	Micky Flanagan	Anneka Rice
9	2	"Episode 2"	21 April 2018	Moira Stuart	Kara Tointon	Tom Davis	Suzanne Packer
10	3	"Episode 3"	28 April 2018	Johnny Vegas	Samantha Giles	Sue Johnston	Jimmy Osmond
11	4	"Episode 4"	5 May 2018	Una Stubbs	Janet Street-Porter	Alex Brooker	Jordan Stephens
12	5	"Episode 5"	12 May 2018	Gaynor Faye	Anita Rani	Cannon and Ball	Robert Winston
13	6	"Episode 6"	19 May 2018	Rosemary Shrager	Liza Tarbuck	Peter Davison	Louis Walsh
14	7	"Episode 7"	26 May 2018	Charlie Brooks	Chizzy Akudolu	Lolly Adefope	Carol Vorderman
15	8	"Episode 8 - Unseen"	9 June 2018	Various	Various	Various	Various

=== Series 3 (2019) ===
No. overall	No, in series	Episode	Date	Panelist 1	Panelist 2	Panelist 3	Panelist 4
16	1	"Episode 1"	8 June 2019	Martine McCutcheon	Les Dennis	Alison Hammond	Tom Courtenay
17	2	"Episode 2"	15 June 2019	Kevin Whately	Konnie Huq	Georgia Taylor	Bill Roache
18	3	"Episode 3"	22 June 2019	Krishnan Guru-Murthy	Stephanie Beacham	Pam Ferris	Tom Allen
19	4	"Episode 4"	29 June 2019	Chris Packham	Chelsee Healey	The Krankies	Pam St Clement
20	5	"Episode 5"	6 July 2019	Nick Helm	Jennie Bond	Angellica Bell	Patrick Mower
21	6	"Episode 6"	13 July 2019	Warwick Davis	Charlie Dimmock	Kelly Brook	Sarah Greene
22	7	"Episode 7"	20 July 2019	Josh Widdicombe	Amanda Barrie	Samantha Womack	Michael Buerk
