= The Harry Hill Movie =

2013 film by Steve Bendelack

- United Kingdom theatrical release poster
- Directed by: Steve Bendelack
- Screenplay by: Harry Hill; Jon Foster; James Lamont
- Story by: Harry Hill
- Produced by: Robert Jones
- Starring: Harry Hill; Julie Walters; Matt Lucas; Simon Bird; Sheridan Smith; Johnny Vegas; Jim Broadbent
- Cinematography: Baz Irvine
- Edited by: Michael Parker
- Music by: Steve Brown
- Production companies: Lucky Features; Jonescompany Productions
- Distributed by: Entertainment Film Distributors
- Release date: 20 December 2013
- Running time: 88 minutes
- Country: United Kingdom
- Language: English
- Budget: £2 million
- Box office: £4.1 million

The Harry Hill Movie is a 2013 British musical comedy film, directed by Steve Bendelack and starring Harry Hill. It was written by Hill along with Jon Foster and James Lamont. It revolves around a fictional version of Harry Hill's adventures with his grandmother (known simply as Nan) and misdiagnosed hamster. The film was released on 20 December 2013 in the United Kingdom and Ireland. It received generally negative reviews from critics.

== Plot ==
Harry Hill is told by his grandmother Nan the story of his twin brother Otto. He was abandoned by Nan in the 1970s, claiming she could not look after them both, and was raised by German Shepherd dogs. Harry and Nan then discover that their pet hamster Abu is ill. Ed the vet and his assistant, Kisko, claim that Abu has just a week to live and he is almost put down until Harry takes him back home. Ed and Kisko are then revealed to be working for Otto, who wants Abu for himself.

Ed and Kisko then disguise themselves as a priest and a nun respectively in another attempt to capture Abu, but it goes wrong when Harry walks in on the two trying to kill Abu and thinks they are having sex. With the two gone, Abu reveals that he would like to spend his last week alive visiting Rihanna. Harry, who cannot communicate with hamsters, misinterprets as him wanting to go to Blackpool.

Ed and Kisko pursue the group on the road driving a giant mobile traffic cone, though they end up in "Blackpole" by mistake, so they stay for the night in a bed and breakfast owned by The Magic Numbers. The next day, Harry and Nan take Abu on a personal guided tour around a nuclear power plant by Bill the cleaner in drag. Ed and Kisko attempt to capture Abu again, this time by disguising themselves as cleaners, only for the radiation to temporarily transform him into a giant kaiju monster.

Later, Harry, Nan and Abu encounter Barney Cull, a member of the Shell People, who asks Harry and the others to save his people's children from a gift shop. The heist is a success and they are invited back to the Shell People's cave. Harry falls for the Shell King Conch's daughter, Michelle, but leaves after being unable to cope living underwater.

The three continue their road trip only to end up in a boxing match, set up by Ed disguised as a ringmaster-like referee, where Harry has to fight Kisko to keep Abu, and successfully wins with a free stick of rock. Later on, the car runs out of petrol in the middle of the woods and Harry and Nan leave Abu behind while they search for a petrol station, and was almost kidnapped again by Ed and Kisko only to leave the car in pieces.

Meanwhile, Otto teams them up with the master-of-disguise fox Renard Depardieu. Harry, Nan, and Abu hitch a ride in a limo with Ed and Kisko disguised as Justin Bieber and Selena Gomez, and they arrive in Blackpool to see a show featuring The Dachsund Five, a tribute band to the Jackson 5. Harry is reunited with Michelle, much to Nan's dismay. Abu is kidnapped and replaced with Renard in a hamster hoodie.

While Harry and Nan look for Abu, they follow a trail of barbecue beef Hula Hoops to Otto's hideout, where Otto reveals his plan to turn Abu into a model figurine for his collection as an act of revenge for being deserted. During a fight between the two, Nan reveals that she got rid of Otto because she kept getting him and Harry mixed up. After being chased away by killer brains, Harry and Nan are saved by the Shell People. Barney shoots one of the brains with a bazooka, to which Nan accepts his and Michelle's love. Harry pursues Otto to the top of the Blackpool Tower. Nan rescues him and Abu in a helicopter, and Otto is defeated after Kisko betrays him and throws him from the tower.

Harry catches Abu sucking a green felt tip pen which turns out to be the cause of his illness, meaning that he was never ill. Ed explains that hamsters like sucking on felt tips, and he gave it to Abu so he would be sick and start this whole plan, even though Harry points out that he could have just kidnapped Abu then. Everyone celebrates in the Shell People's cave by singing "You Got the Love".

== Cast ==
- Harry Hill as a fictional version of himself
- Julie Walters as Harry and Otto's nan
- Matt Lucas as Otto Hill, Harry's evil twin brother who got separated from Harry when they were younger and was raised by German shepherd dogs
- Simon Bird as Ed, a veterinarian and one of Otto's former henchmen
- Sheridan Smith as Michelle, the daughter of the shell king
- Johnny Vegas as the voice of Abu, Harry's pet hamster
  - Richard Coombs as the puppetry for Abu
- Julian Barratt as Conch, the king of the shell people
- Marc Wootton as Barney Cull, a member of the shell people
- Jim Broadbent as Bill, a cleaner in drag
- Guillaume Delaunay as Kisko, another one of Otto's former henchmen
- The Magic Numbers as themselves
- Christine Ozanne as Mrs. Pickford, Harry and Nan's neighbour who has a brick for a replacement pet due to the death of her dog
- Shingai Shoniwa as a singing car wash attendant
- Sean Foley as Renard Depardieu, a French-accented fox who is a master of disguise
- Andy Heath and Dave Thompson as The Brains, giant walking killer brains with sharp teeth

== Production ==
In February 2012, before the end of Harry Hill's TV Burp, Digital Spy reported Hill was to sign a £2 million movie deal with Channel 4, which would later become The Harry Hill Movie.

=== Filming ===
Set in Blackpool and London, the Blackpool scenes in the film were shot in the town itself. Greatstone-on-Sea, Kent doubled as "Blackpole". The fuel station scene was shot at Millbrook Proving Ground, Bedfordshire.

In real life, Blackpole is an inland suburb of Worcester, which, like the fictional town in the movie, is frequently confused for Blackpool by satellite navigation users.

=== Music ===
- "Popcorn" – performed by Steve Brown
- "Days" – performed by Harry Hill
- "Blackpool!" – performed by Harry Hill and Julie Walters
- "Nutbush City Limits" – performed by Matt Lucas
- "B & B Song" – performed by The Magic Numbers
- "London's Burning" – written by Harry Hill
- "Down in the Deep Blue Sea" – performed by Sheridan Smith
- "Fight!" (Theme from 'Flashing Blade') – performed by The Musketeers
- "Drive Through My Carwash" – performed by Shingai Shoniwa and Harry Hill
- "ABC" – performed by The Dachsund Five
- "I Want You Back" – performed by The Dachsund Five
- "Celebration" – performed by Kool & the Gang
- "And the Rain Falls in My Heart" – performed by the cast
- "Frere Jacques" – performed by Harry Hill
- "Plastination" – performed by Steve Brown and The Plastinettes
- "You Got The Love" – performed by The Cast
- "Get Down" – performed by Gilbert O'Sullivan

== Release and reception ==
The film was theatrically released on 20 December 2013 by Entertainment Film Distributors, and was released on DVD and Blu-ray on 14 April 2014 by Entertainment Film Distributors. When the film was released in the United Kingdom, it opened on #7.

=== Critical reception ===
On the review aggregator website Rotten Tomatoes, 33% of 6 critics' reviews are positive.

Ryan Gilbey of The Guardian gave it 2 out of 5 and wrote "What's missing is any persuasive comic force or vision to justify the film's place in cinemas rather than in petrol station bargain bins".

The Independent were also critical saying its screenplay wasn't "so much offbeat as utterly feeble" and "it is very hard to keep patience with a story which hinges on the health of a toy hamster". However Graham Young for the Birmingham Mail, on a more positive note said, "Uniquely British and deliriously silly, Harry Hill offers up the laughs".

Tom Huddleston from Time Out gave it three stars, saying "this has bigger laughs" and "the set-piece gags are memorable"; however, he added "There's not enough here to sustain 88 minutes, too many of the jokes fall flat... There will be those who find The Harry Hill Movie about as amusing as a trip to the dentist. They're wrong."
