= Simply the Best (game show) =

- Genre: Sports Game show
- Presented by: Phil Tufnell; Kirsty Gallacher
- Starring: Paul Durkin
- Narrated by: Howard Hughes
- Countries of origin: United Kingdom; Jersey
- Original language: English
- No. of series: 1
- No. of episodes: 8

Production
- Running time: 90-120mins (inc. adverts)
- Production companies: Carlton and Channel Television

Original release
- Network: ITV
- Release: 17 July – 4 September 2004

Related
- It's a Knockout

Simply the Best is a British sports game show that ran from 17 July to 4 September 2004 on ITV. It was hosted by Phil Tufnell and Kirsty Gallacher.

== Format ==
The show was broadcast from a specially constructed outside arena in St Helier, the capital of Jersey in the Channel Islands. Teams from 14 cities across the UK competed in the series, with each team comprising four males, two females and a celebrity of each gender. Each week, two teams went head-to-head in a series of games to earn points for a head start in the final deciding challenge.

The games varied from week to week but two of those that appeared on every show were 'Beat the Balloon' and '60 Second Screamer'. In 'Beat the Balloon', one of the celebrity contestants from each team competed in a head-to-head quiz, the contestant holding a rapidly inflating balloon had to guess the exact answer to a question, which was a number, and could only pass the balloon to their opponent when they get it right, every time they answer incorrectly, they are given a clue as to whether the actual answer is either higher or lower than their previous answer. The contestant holding the balloon when it bursts loses the game. This game was played again later in each show, with the other pair of celebrities taking part.

'60 Second Screamer' was the only game recorded in advance, as it was filmed at Blackpool Pleasure Beach. One celebrity from each team was tasked with answering as many general knowledge questions as possible whilst riding The Big One roller coaster.

The final challenge in each show was 'Champions Wall'. The number of points earned by each team throughout the show determined how many notches on the wall ladder that each team's first contestant started from. The contestant is required to ascend up the wall ladder using only their arms to move the supporting pole and with their legs crossed at all times. The first team to get their three contestants up to the top of the wall won the show.

After all 14 cities had taken part, the two winning teams from across the series that completed the 'Champions Wall' in the fastest time advanced to the grand final where they would compete to win £50,000 for local community projects in their area.

Each show also featured performances from top music acts. The show's running length was originally two hours, though later episodes had both this runtime shortened to 90 minutes as well as being moved to an earlier timeslot in response to low viewing figures. The show ultimately only lasted for one series.
