= Tim the Tiny Horse at Large =

- Book Cover
- Author: Harry Hill
- Language: English
- Genre: Fantasy, comedy
- Publisher: Faber Children's Books
- Publication date: 4 September 2008
- Publication place: United Kingdom
- Media type: Print (hardback)
- Pages: 176
- ISBN: 978-0-571-23602-2
- Preceded by: Tim the Tiny Horse

Tim the Tiny Horse at Large is a book of stories for children written and illustrated by comedian Harry Hill, and published in 2008. It is the sequel to Tim the Tiny Horse.

== Plot summary ==
Tim is still small yet his responsibilities are growing larger. Whilst continuing to live in his matchbox stable, he falls in love with Fly's sister Chenille, is Best Horse at Fly's wedding, babysits for Mr and Mrs Fly's baby, and buys a loft style apartment cigarette box, using a five-pound cheque. Then, Tim goes to buy a pet greenfly, George, and has to face up to the responsibilities and tragedies of being a pet owner.

== Characters ==
- Tim the Tiny Horse – The main character
- George the Greenfly – Tim's pet greenfly who later dies.
- George the Second – Tim's second pet greenfly
- Fly – Tim's Best friend
- Mrs. Fly – The pregnant spouse of Fly.
- Maggot – Fly's son.
- Chenille – Fly's sister.
- Fly's Mother – Fly's mother who sings at George's funeral.
- Fly's Grandma – Fly's grandmother who is living with Fly.

== History ==
Tim the Tiny Horse at Large was released on September 4, 2008. It is also known as Tim the Tiny Horse 2.
