= Tim the Tiny Horse =

2005 short story by Harry Hill

- Poster
- Language: English
- Genre: Fantasy, comedy
- Publisher: Faber Children's Books
- Publication date: 5 October 2005
- Publication place: United Kingdom
- Pages: 176
- ISBN: 978-0-571-22955-0
- Followed by: Tim the Tiny Horse At Large

Tim the Tiny Horse is a short story about a very small horse, written by comedian Harry Hill. It was first released in 2005.

== Sequels ==
Tim the Tiny Horse At Large was released on September 4, 2009. Another book, A Complete History of Tim (the Tiny Horse), was released on March 9, 2014.
