= Kirsty's Home Videos =

British TV comedy series (2000–2005)

- Genre: Comedy; Clip show
- Presented by: Kirsty Gallacher
- Country of origin: United Kingdom
- Original language: English
- No. of series: 6
- No. of episodes: 99

Production
- Running time: 30 minutes (inc. adverts)
- Production company: Granada Television

Original release
- Network: Sky 1
- Release: April 2000 – September 2005

Related
- You've Been Framed!

Kirsty's Home Videos is a British comedy clip show, that was broadcast on Sky 1 and hosted by then-Sky Sports News presenter Kirsty Gallacher. It was similar in format and content to ITV's You've Been Framed!, and like it, was also produced by Granada Television. It was broadcast between April 2000 and September 2005, running for six series during its time.

== Features ==
The features that were included were home video clips of mainly people falling over, making a fool of themselves and at the end of the programme was a short section showing nude adult men and women doing daring things like walking through parks and going to a bar.

Some series had seventeen episodes each and were shown on Sky1 every Thursday or Friday. Each series included a Christmas special and sometimes an uncut episode.

All the episodes lasted for 30 minutes.

The final series ended with a two-hour episode which featured outtakes and mishaps.

== Controversy ==
The episode broadcast on Sky One at 1pm on 1 August 2005 included a clip of a skateboarder falling from a skate ramp. The skate ramp included an offensive message and swearing (fuck), leading one viewer to complain to Ofcom. The graffiti, which appeared to the side of the screen, went unnoticed by Sky prior to broadcast. The channel blurred the offensive language for future broadcast of the episode.

== Transmissions ==
Series	Start date	End date	Episodes	Specials
1	April 2000	June 2000	14	
2	March 2001	June 2001	17	
3	June 2002	September 2002	17	Kirsty's Home Videos Animal Special
4	October 2003	December 2003	17	Kirsty's Home Videos Uncut! (Episode 1)
5	February 2004	April 2004	16	Kirsty's Home Videos Uncut! (Episode 2)
6	May 2005	September 2005	18	Kirsty's Home Videos Uncut! (Episode 3) and Kirsty's Home Videos Final Episode.
