= Bad Penny (TV series) =

British television series

- Written by: Dean Wilkinson
- Country of origin: United Kingdom
- Original language: English
- No. of series: 2
- No. of episodes: 13

Original release
- Network: CBBC
- Release: 2003 – 2004

Bad Penny is a British children's television series written by English comedy writer Dean Wilkinson. It ran for two series (13 episodes) from 2003 to 2004. It starred 17-year-old Anne Foy in the title role and comedian Graham Fellows, also known as John Shuttleworth, as her father.

== Characters and plot ==
Penny Dreadful (Anne Foy) is constantly trying to thwart the dealings of her wayward family, who are always looking for unusual ways to make money.

In each episode, Penny would also have to contend with strange and bizarre characters that stumbled through her wardrobe, an occasional portal to other worlds and dimensions. The noble Penny always strove to help characters such as a foul mouthed runaway scarecrow, a Dickensian rat-catcher chasing a giant rat called Lord Ironside, and Chips – a Geordie space pilot dog in a story that borrowed from the plot of the 1968 film, Planet of the Apes. Indeed, the show's running catchphrase "This is a mad house, a mad house!" was taken directly from the film and was uttered once in every episode.

The humour was a surreal blend of slapstick and intelligent dialogue with Pythonesque self-contained stories, sub plots and throwaway vignettes.

== Cast ==
The show's cast boasted a regular troupe of actors who played different parts each episode, including That's Life!'s Adrian Mills, Coronation Street's Martin Hancock and character actor Rusty Goffe who appeared in the original Willy Wonka & the Chocolate Factory as an Oompa-Loompa, and the original Star Wars as a Jawa and a Droid. Goffe, coincidentally enough, played Goober in Stupid!, another CBBC show written by Dean Wilkinson. Series 1 was directed by Graeme Harper, who directed 1980s episodes of Doctor Who as well as episodes of the 2006 series featuring David Tennant.
