= Harry Hill =

English comedian (born 1964)

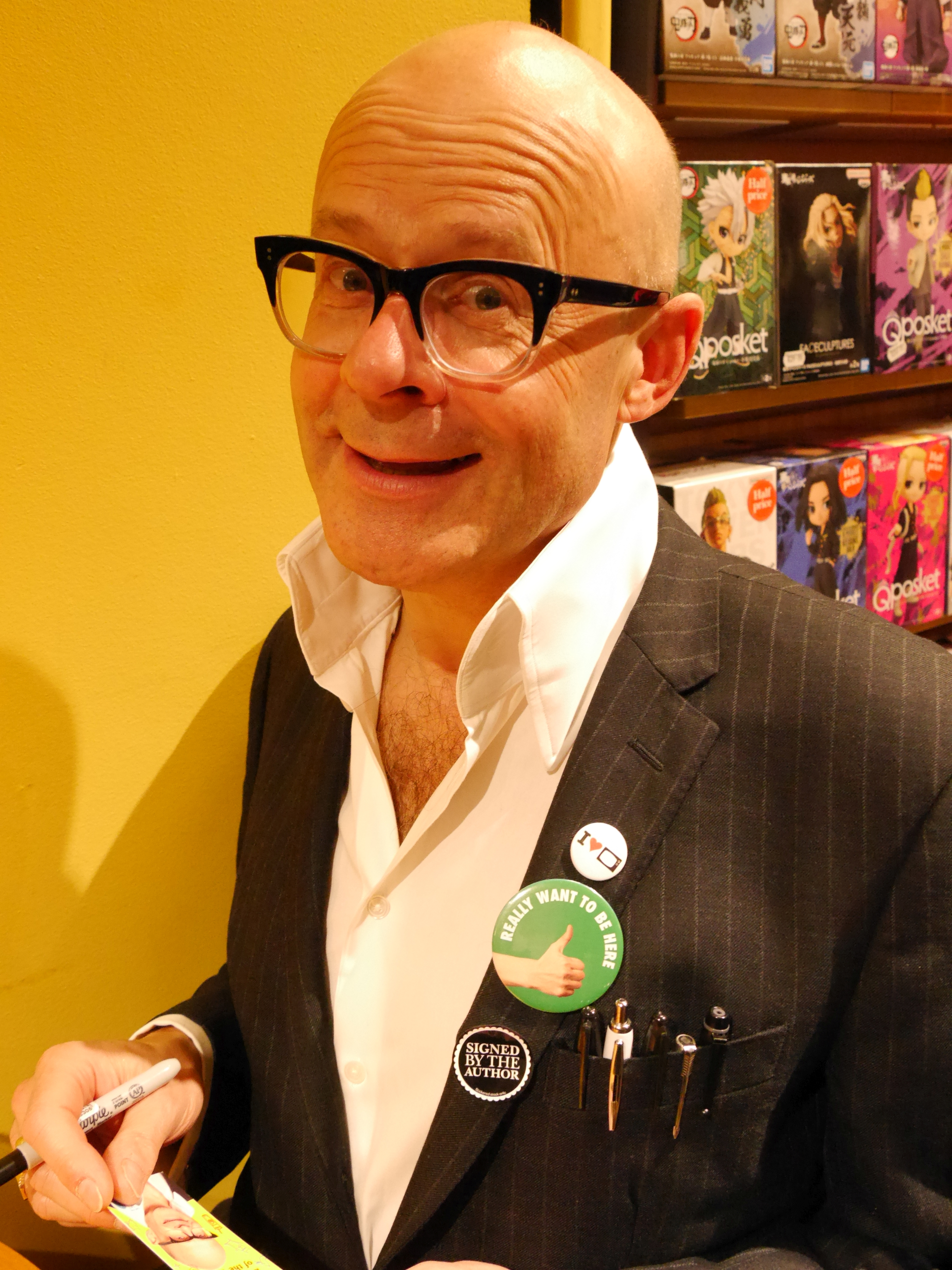
- Hill at Waterstones, London in 2024
- Born: Matthew Keith Hall; 1 October 1964 (age 62); Woking, Surrey, England
- Education: St George's Hospital Medical School (MBBS)
- Notable work: Harry Hill's Fruit Corner (1993–1997); Harry Hill (1997–2000, 2003); Harry Hill's TV Burp (2001–2012); You've Been Framed! (2004–2022); Harry Hill's Tea Time (2016–2018); Harry Hill's Alien Fun Capsule (2017–2019); Junior Bake Off (2019–present); Harry Hill's Clubnite (2019); Harry Hill's World Of TV (2020); The Harry Hill Show (2026–present)
- Spouse: Magda Archer (m. 1996)
- Children: 3

Comedy career
- Years active: 1992–present
- Medium: Film; radio; stand-up; television
- Genres: Character comedy; improvisational comedy; insult comedy; musical comedy; observational comedy; surreal humour
- Subjects: Everyday life; pop culture; television; human history
- Website: www.harryhill.co.uk

Matthew Keith Hall (born 1 October 1964), known professionally as Harry Hill, is an English comedian, presenter and writer. He pursued a career in stand-up following years working as a medical doctor, developing an offbeat, energetic performance style that fused elements of surrealism, observational comedy, slapstick, satire and music. When performing, he usually wears browline glasses and a dress shirt with a distinctive oversized collar and cuffs.

Hill won the Perrier Award for Best Newcomer at the 1992 Edinburgh Festival Fringe, and began his career in radio and television comedy with the radio series Harry Hill's Fruit Corner (1993–1997). He has hosted his own television comedy shows Harry Hill (1997–2003) and Harry Hill's TV Burp (2001–2012), and narrated You've Been Framed! from 2004 to 2022. His other projects include The Harry Hill Movie, released in 2013.

== Early life, education and medical career ==
Hill was born in Woking, Surrey on 1 October 1964 and grew up in Staplehurst, Kent, where he attended the local primary school. At the age of 14, Hill moved with his family to Hong Kong for two years and attended Island School there. He was later educated at Angley School and then Cranbrook School in Kent and St George's Hospital Medical School receiving his MBBS medical degree from the University of London in 1988. Hill worked as a urologist at Doncaster Royal Infirmary before quitting the medical profession because he "didn't feel in control of what was happening".

In 2020, during the COVID-19 pandemic in the United Kingdom, Hill nearly returned to work at the temporary NHS Nightingale Hospital London, after filling in the form after "a few drinks". He was asked if he could start immediately due to his last medical specialism being in respiratory emergencies. However, he turned down the role owing to travel issues.

== Career ==
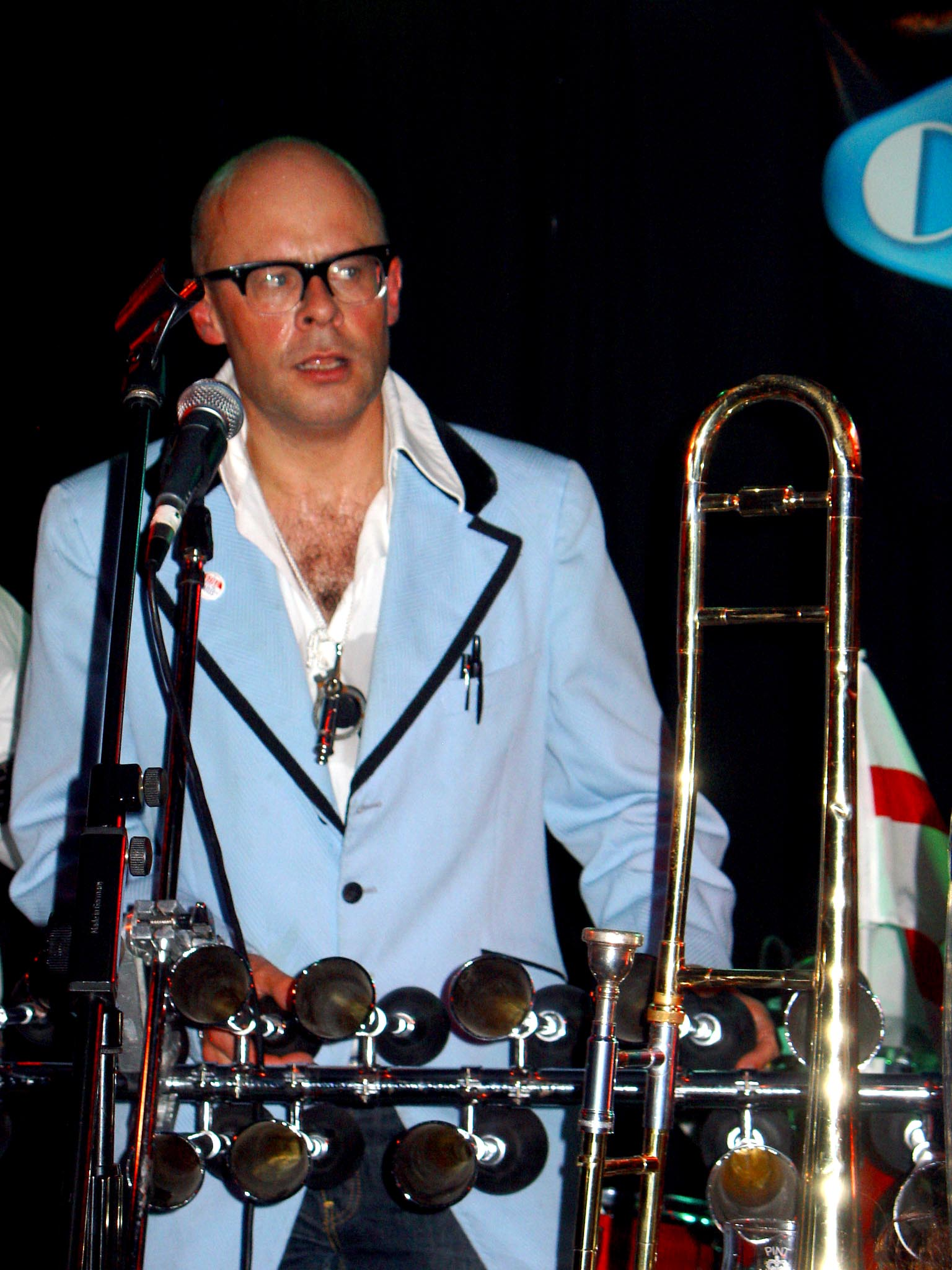
Hill performing live with The Caterers in 2006

=== Harry Hill's Fruit Corner (1993–1997) ===
Hill achieved his breakthrough in 1992, when he won the Perrier Award for Best Newcomer at the Edinburgh Festival Fringe. Shortly after, a radio show starring Hill was commissioned by BBC Radio 4 entitled Harry Hill's Fruit Corner. Hill hosted the show as himself, and each week he was joined by various guest performers, as well as regular character actors including Al Murray and Burt Kwouk. The show featured a variety of other celebrity guests during its run including Rolf Harris and Ronnie Corbett. Each episode is interspersed with Hill's stand-up routines. Fruit Corner ran for four series on BBC Radio 4.

=== Harry Hill's Fruit Fancies (1994) ===
Hill made his television breakthrough in 1994, when he starred in BBC2 black-and-white silent comedy series Harry Hill's Fruit Fancies. In a similar format to Fruit Corner, Hill performed a series of sketches, with celebrity guests making cameo appearances.

The series ran for six episodes on BBC2 between October and December 1994. For Christmas that year, a VHS containing a 100-minute compilation of the best material from the series, as well as unseen sketches, was released by BBC Video.

=== Harry Hill (1997–2003) ===
Harry Hill got his own television series on Channel 4 in 1997. Among the regular characters were Harry Hill's big brother, Alan, played by Al Murray, and his adopted son, Alan Jr., played by Matt Bradstock. Burt Kwouk also appeared in many episodes as Harry's "Chicken Catcher" – and each week, he would come up with an excuse as to why he has not yet captured a chicken, followed by a performance of the song "Hey Little Hen". In later series, Hill and Kwouk appeared in sketches as Karl Lagerfeld and Gianni Versace.

Hill's screen wife Mai Sung also made several appearances on the show, mainly on the theme of trying to steal his Abbey National bank savings book. Another character that featured on the show was Stouffer the Cat, a glove puppet cat made from blue rubber. Stouffer would normally sit in a throne, supported by a rubber arm in the style of Rod Hull, and was employed to intimidate guests during Hill's standup routines. Some of Stouffer's catchphrases are "he got a big face" and "sorted – respect due".

At the end of each episode, an event called "The Badger Parade" was supposed to take place. The parade featured a number of puppet badgers that included "Gareth Southgate badger" and "Tasmin Archer badger", among others – however, every week, there would be some kind of problem, resulting in the badgers being unable to perform. In place of the badger parade, Hill would usually sing a song, with a guest that he had invited onto the show. A tie-in book relating to the series was released in October 1998, entitled Harry Hill's Fun Book.

The series was cancelled in April 2000 but was revived by ITV in March 2003, as The All-New Harry Hill Show. It was broadcast in between the first two series of Hill's new ITV show TV Burp. Regular features on the ITV version included the Hamilton Challenge, featuring Neil and Christine Hamilton, and a butterfly in blue jeans. The Channel 4 series was revisited in August 2012, for a retrospective documentary entitled Whatever Happened to Harry Hill?.

=== Harry Hill's TV Burp (2001–2012) ===
In October 2001, Hill moved to ITV in a lucrative deal, in which he created an all-new show, Harry Hill's TV Burp, where he would take a look at the week's television, showing clips from various British television programmes, and framing them with funny commentary or intercutting additional footage.

The series would feature a regular stable of all new characters, including the Knitted Character, a small knitted rabbit, Wagbo, a demon love child whose parents are reportedly Wagner Carillho and Mary Byrne of X Factor fame, and an interpretation of Heather Trott from EastEnders, played by Steve Bernham, as well as a doll of The Apprentice star Alan Sugar, who would regularly rap before clips of The Apprentice were introduced.

The show was piloted in December 2001, before running for eleven full series between 2002 and 2012, before being cancelled to allow Hill to work on other projects. Hill would occasionally say his catchphrase "Chippy chips!" and the show became known for another catchphrase "You get the idea with that" and Hill's actual sideways look at a topic. The show won a number of BAFTA awards, and spawned five Best of TV Burp DVD compilations, and a book based on the series, which was released for Christmas 2009.

=== You've Been Framed! (2004–2022) ===
From 2004 to 2022, Hill narrated 15 series of the comical clip show You've Been Framed!, often shortened to YBF!, replacing Jonathan Wilkes as a studio presenter on the show. In February 2023, it was reported that the show had been axed by ITV.

=== Harry Hill's Shark Infested Custard (2005) ===
In October 2005, Hill wrote and starred in Harry Hill's Shark Infested Custard, a thirteen-part show broadcast in the CITV children's television slot, on ITV. While many of his well-known characters, such as Stouffer and Garry Hill, his fictional layabout son from his first marriage, remained, it also showcased several new characters, including Speed Camera Boy, an outsider who is half boy and half speed camera, and Evelynne Hussey, a one-woman band who played a number of different instruments.

While the show featured a game-show element, Help the Aged, it was very similar in structure to Harry Hill. In the show, Hill wore a pale yellow, custard-coloured shirt, with a giant collar, instead of his usual white collar.

The series was never released on DVD; however, it did spawn Harry Hill's Whopping Great Joke Book, a book of children's jokes, released in 2006. The book was also made available as an iPhone application. A second book, Harry Hill's Bumper Book of Bloopers, was released for Christmas 2011.

=== The Harry Hill Movie (2013) ===
The Harry Hill Movie premiered in the United Kingdom on 20 December 2013. The film also stars Matt Lucas, Julie Walters, Johnny Vegas, Sheridan Smith, Simon Bird, Marc Wootton, Jim Broadbent, and band The Magic Numbers. The film sees Hill embark on a road trip to Blackpool with his Nan (Julie Walters) when he discovers that his hamster has only one week to live.

The 88-minute film was directed by Steve Bendelack and made $3,647,870 at the box office. It was also released on DVD on 14 April 2014.

=== Stars in Their Eyes (2015) ===
Hill presented a revived version of the ITV talent show Stars in Their Eyes. The series aired for six episodes from 10 January until 14 February 2015. The revival has proved divisive. Fans of the original format were extremely critical of it, saying that Hill had made the show about himself rather than the contestants.

In April 2015, it was announced that the show had been axed by ITV, due to poor ratings.

=== Harry Hill's Tea Time (2016–2018) ===
Tea Time saw Hill welcome guests to a spoof comedy kitchen and ask them to cook bizarre things. A new entertainment series for Sky 1, the first series debuted on 16 October 2016, and was viewed by 400,000 viewers. Ratings slipped the following week, when only 180,000 watched. Guests for the first series included Paul Hollywood, Joey Essex, Gok Wan, Martin Kemp and Jason Donovan.

Harry Hill's Tea Time was commissioned for a second series which began airing in January 2018.

=== Harry Hill's Alien Fun Capsule (2017–2019) ===
In March 2017, Hill began presenting six thirty-minute episodes of Harry Hill's Alien Fun Capsule, which aired on ITV on Thursday nights, 8.30 to 9 pm.

The panel show sees Harry welcoming two teams of two celebrity guests as they are tasked with saving planet Earth from alien invasion by sending evidence (via the "fun capsule" of the title) that Earthlings are good fun and therefore worthy of saving from destruction. Harry alludes to the premise of the show as being rather tenuous in a running joke during each show's introduction, before introducing the two teams of guests, usually a mix of comedians and television stars.

In a similar style to Harry Hill's TV Burp, the show includes various clips from television and film, often attributed or related somehow to the current guests. The guests also partake in sketches and songs based on or directly spoofing the funny or bizarre items featured. There is a regular slot entitled "Local News Round Up", accompanied by its own theme tune, which involves each of the guests taking turns to read out bizarre headlines from local newspapers. Alan the Alien also appears as a green extra-terrestrial's arm, emerging from a box to aid Harry in some way.

Guests on the show included George Formby Society, Alison Hammond and Les Dennis.

The series has received positive reviews, with many pointing out the similarities to TV Burp.

The show moved to Saturday evenings between 7.30 pm and 8.00 pm for a second series, aired in 2018, and a third in 2019.

=== Harry Hill's World of TV (2020) ===
In 2020, Harry Hill started presenting Harry Hill's World of TV. Using archive clips, this TV Burp-style show pokes fun at television, with each episode themed around a specific genre.

=== Novels ===
In 2002, Hill published a novel entitled Flight from Deathrow, based around the unlikely fictional antics of real-life celebrities and politicians, as seen through the eyes of a storyteller who drifts in and out of a coma. His second book, Tim the Tiny Horse, was published in October 2006, and featured the tale of a small horse who has to wear glasses because of poor eyesight.

Hill's third book, The Further Adventures of the Queen Mum, was published in October 2007, and was a comic take on the life and times of the Queen Mother. His fourth novel, Tim the Tiny Horse at Large, which is a sequel to Tim the Tiny Horse, was published in October 2009.

In 2010, Hill released Livin' the Dreem, a fictional account of a year in his life with frequent references to pop culture. The book was reprinted in May 2011, with additional entries for events occurring between January and April of that year.

A Complete History of Tim (the Tiny Horse) was published in November 2012 which contains the first two Tim the Tiny Horse novels, with four new stories.

=== Other projects ===
Hill was a regular on Saturday Live, which was broadcast in 1996 on ITV for eight episodes.

Hill has recorded voice-overs on television commercials. Advertisements that Hill has provided a voice over for include the holiday adverts for Boots in 2004, the "Bring on the Branston!" adverts for the Branston Pickle brand during 2006 to 2007, adverts for the Green Flag car breakdown service, and adverts for the new yogurt, Danio by Danone. He also sang in 2001 "This Charming Man" by The Smiths as Morrissey in Stars in their Eyes.

In February 2001, and again in April, Hill appeared on Lily Savage's Blankety Blank. Hill has also appeared as a guest on the BBC Radio 4 series I'm Sorry I Haven't a Clue, in the ChuckleVision episode "Mind Your Manors", the first episode of the twentieth series, and as Joon Boolay in the Sky Atlantic sitcom This is Jinsy. Between July and October 2003, Hill presented a Sunday morning comedy and music show on Capital Radio called "Funch". In October 2006, Hill presented his own episode of long running ITV series, An Audience With..., in which he revived several characters from Harry Hill. On 4 October 2004, he also appeared in an episode of Room 101.

In the autumn of 2008, Hill launched Harry's Nuts, a brand of Fairtrade peanuts.

In November 2010, Hill released his debut comic album, Funny Times. The album was preceded by the singles "I Wanna Baby", "SuBo", and "Ken!", which featured William Roache, as his Coronation Street character, Ken Barlow, as the feature of the song. Since October 2010, Hill has had his own comic strip in The Dandy, entitled Harry Hill's Real Life Adventures in TV Land, drawn by Nigel Parkinson. Hill was directly involved in its creation and is co-credited with Parkinson. Between October and December 2010, Hill starred in a weekly online comedy series on the ChannelFlip website, entitled Harry Hill's Little Internet Show. Ten episodes of the show were broadcast online.

Hill has been a presenter on Junior Bake Off since the series recommenced on Channel 4 in 2019 for its fifth season. He competed on the seventh series of The Masked Singer as "Red Panda". He was unmasked on the sixth episode.

=== Podcasts ===
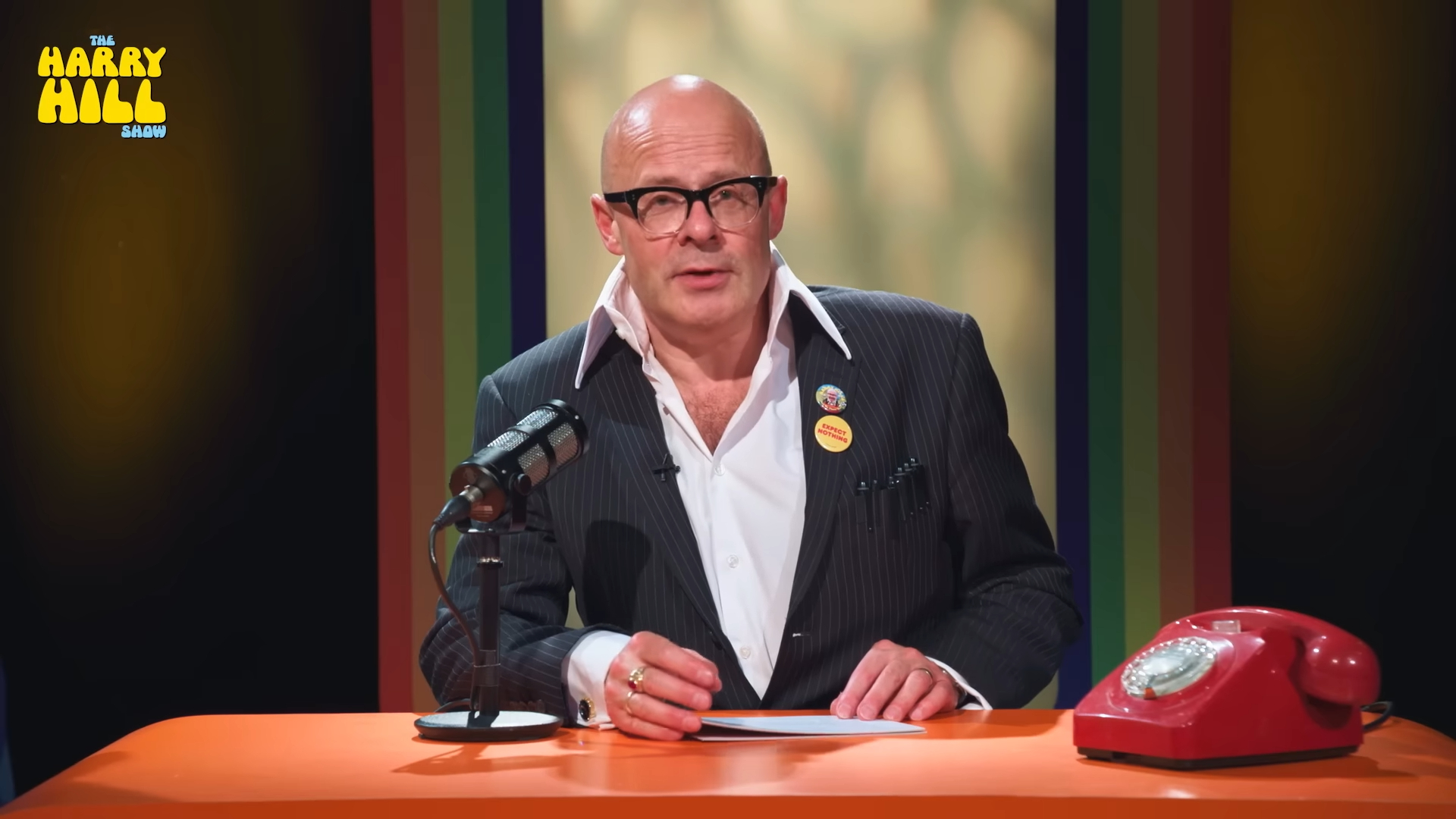
Hill hosting The Harry Hill Show podcast

Hill launched his first podcast Noise in 2020. Running for 12 episodes, it featured ambient recordings and no guests or dialogue. His next podcast Are We There Yet featured celebrity guests and several regular segments and a weekly expert. Renamed The Harry Hill Show, the podcast relaunched visually in January 2026.

== Recognition ==
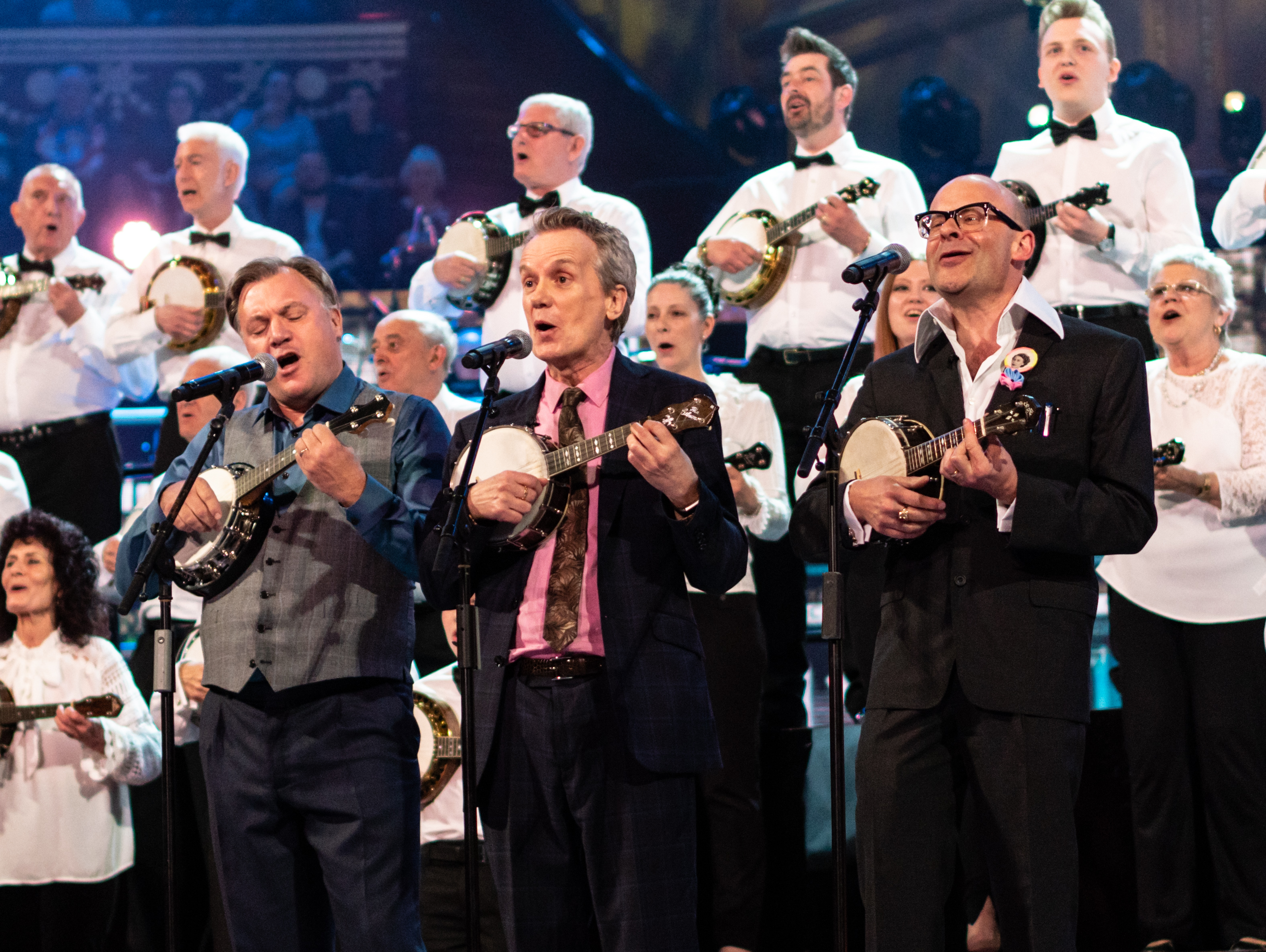
Hill (right) performing at The Queen's Birthday Party with Ed Balls (left) and Frank Skinner (centre).

In 2003, The Observer listed Hill as one of the fifty funniest acts in British comedy. In 2005, in a poll to find The Comedian's Comedian, he was voted amongst the Top 50 comedy acts ever by fellow comedians and comedy insiders. In 2007, Hill was voted number five on Channel 4's hundred greatest stand ups. On 13 December 2006, Hill won two Highland Spring British Comedy Awards, over the favourites Ant and Dec, which Hill made light of in his acceptance speeches.

In 2008, he won two BAFTAs, and another in 2009 for Best Entertainment Performance. In 2009, he won two British Comedy Awards, making it his sixth award. He also won again in 2011, but was unable to be there and sent Wagbo to collect it on his behalf. He was also nominated for three other awards, including the People's Choice Award, which was won by Miranda Hart.

On 17 July 2014, Hill was awarded an honorary Doctorate of Arts by the University of Kent, in recognition of his contribution to television and the arts.

== Personal life ==
Hill married artist Magda Archer in 1996, in Wandsworth, London. They have three daughters, all born in Kensington and Chelsea. Hill and his family live in Whitstable, Kent. In February 2006, Hill was a victim of identity theft; a sum of £280,000 was stolen from his bank account.

On 25 August 2016, Hill became a patron of Action Duchenne which funds research for Duchenne muscular dystrophy, and fights for improved standards of care. Hill is a fan of George Formby and is a member of the George Formby Society. Hill is a supporter of the Labour Party and canvassed for the party during the 2015 general election.

== Filmography ==
Television

Year	Title	Role	Note(s)
1994	Fruit Fancies	Himself, Various	Also writer
1996	Saturday Live	Himself	Stand Up
1996	Top of the Pops	Presenter	1 episode
1997–2000, 2003	Harry Hill	Presenter	4 series
1998	Sooty & Co	Himself, Estate Agent	CITV
2001–2012	Harry Hill's TV Burp	Presenter	11 series; also writer
2004–2022	You've Been Framed!	Narrator	Writer
2005	Harry Hill's Shark Infested Custard	Presenter and Co-Writer	CITV
2007	Ant & Dec's Saturday Night Takeaway	Himself; Star Guest Announcer	ITV
2008	Chucklevision	Simon Chortle in the episode 'Mind Your Manors'	CBBC
2014	The Incredible Adventures of Professor Branestawm	Professor Branestawm	TV movie
2015	Stars in Their Eyes	Presenter	Revived ITV series
2015	Professor Branestawm Returns	Professor Branestawm	TV movie
2016	Harry Hill's Look at Love	Narrator and Writer	BBC iPlayer Exclusive
2016–2018	Harry Hill's Tea-Time	Presenter and Writer	Sky 1 series
2017	Saturday Mash-Up!	Himself, Guest	CBBC
2017–2019	Harry Hill's Alien Fun Capsule	Presenter	ITV series
2018	The Great Stand Up to Cancer Bake Off	Himself, winner	Channel 4
2018	Jamie and Jimmy's Friday Night Feast	Himself, Guest	Channel 4
2019	Harry Hill's Clubnite	Presenter	Channel 4
2019–	Junior Bake Off	Presenter	Channel 4
2020	8 Out of 10 Cats Does Countdown	Himself, Guest	Channel 4
2020	Grayson's Art Club	Himself, Guest	Channel 4
2020	Reasons to be Cheerful	Writer, Himself	Channel 4
2020	Harry Hill's World of TV	Presenter, Writer	BBC Two
2021	Grayson's Art Club	Himself, Guest	Channel 4
2021	Harry Hill's Lonely Island	Caveman, Napelon, Monkey, Writer, and Director	BBC Two
2023	Saturday Kitchen	Himself, Guest	BBC One
2023	The Lateish Show with Mo Gilligan	Himself, Guest	Channel 4
2023	Have I Got News For You	Himself, Guest presenter	BBC One
2023	Wonders of the World I Can't See	Himself, Guest	Channel 4
2026	The Masked Singer	Red Panda (contestant)	ITV

Radio

Year	Title	Role	Note(s)
1994	Harry Hill's Fruit Corner	Himself, various	BBC Radio 4
2017	Life on Egg	Himself	BBC Radio 4

Musicals

Year	Title	Writer	Composer
2014	I Can't Sing! The X Factor Musical	Harry Hill	Steve Brown
2021	TONY! [A Tony Blair Rock Opera]	Harry Hill	Steve Brown

Film

Year	Title	Role	Note(s)
2013	The Harry Hill Movie	Himself, Lead role	Also writer

== Home releases ==
=== Stand-up shows ===
- Live (16 October 1995) VHS
- Man Alive – Live (27 October 1997) VHS
- First Class Scamp – Live (16 November 1998) DVD/VHS
- Birdstrike! – Live (20 November 2000) VHS
- In Hooves – Live (21 November 2005) DVD
- Sausage Time – Live (7 February 2013) DVD
- New Bits and Greatest Hits (20 May 2026) Sky One

=== Television ===
- Fruit Fancies (11 December 1994) VHS
- Harry Hill's TV Burp Gold (10 November 2008, 61 minutes, Rating: 12) DVD
- Harry Hill's TV Burp Gold 2 (9 November 2009, 61 minutes, Rating: 12) DVD
- Harry Hill's TV Burp Gold 3 (1 November 2010, 64 minutes, Rating: PG) DVD
- Harry Hill's TV Burp: The Best Bits (14 November 2011, 60 minutes, Rating: 12) DVD
- Harry Hill's Cream Of TV Burp (26 November 2012, 63 minutes, Rating: PG) DVD

=== Film ===
- The Harry Hill Movie (14 April 2014, 88 minutes, Rating: PG) DVD & Blu-Ray Disc

== Discography ==
=== Audiobooks ===
- Fruit Corner (2 October 1995)
- Hooves (20 March 2006)
- Man Alive (20 February 2007)
- Flight from Deathrow (2 April 2009)
- Livin' the Dreem (4 November 2010)
- Fight!: Thirty Years Not Quite at the Top (14 June 2022)

=== Music ===
- The First Meeting Of The International Recipe Card Top Trump Society (2008)
- Funny Times (29 November 2010)

== Television advertisements ==
Year	Title	Role
2000	First Direct	Himself, voice only
2000	Digital Cellphones	Himself
2003	Branston	Himself, voice only
2004	TUC	Himself, voice only
2004	Boots	Christmas Doctor
2004	The Times	Himself
2007	Walkers	Himself
2009–2010	WHSmith	Himself, voice only
2010	Green Flag	Ant, voice only
2010	Funny Times	Himself
2012	T-Mobile	Himself, voice only
2013	Danio Yogurt	Himself, voice only
2013	Innocent Drinks	Himself, voice only
2025	Donkey Kong Bananza	Himself, voice only

== Collections ==
The University of Kent holds material from Hill as part of the British Stand-Up Comedy Archive. The Harry Hill Collection contains documents relating to Hill's stand-up comedy career, work on radio and television, and copies of The Beano and The Dandy which he was involved with.

Preceded by Jonathan Wilkes	Host of You've Been Framed! 2004–2022
