= Smart As... =

2012 video game

- Developer: Climax Studios
- Publisher: Sony Computer Entertainment
- Producer: Ian Pickles
- Platform: PlayStation Vita
- Release: NA: 30 October 2012; EU: 31 October 2012; AU: 31 October 2012
- Genres: Puzzle, edutainment
- Mode: Single-player

Smart As... is a 2012 edutainment puzzle video game developed by Climax Studios and published by Sony Computer Entertainment for the PlayStation Vita. It is similar in style to Nintendo's Brain Age series.

== Gameplay ==
Smart As... is designed, like most other brain training games, to be played once a day in order to achieve a Brain Power Score. The user is challenged to a brain game from each of the game's four areas: Arithmetic, Logic, Observation and Language. After playing each brain game the user's cumulative average score from each category is presented as their Brain Power Score for the day. This score is then shared with the Smart As World which allows the user to see where their score stands against everyone else in the world. After each day's Daily Training the user will unlock one of brain games in the Free play area allowing them to play and practice at any time.

In addition to the Daily Training Mode and the Free play area the game also contains an extensive charts and stats section allowing the user to see their score from every day played as well as recording the answers to all questions answered and other in game statistics and finally the Smart As World section which contains all of the game's player and geographic leaderboards, access to "near challenges" and a GPS based Street Smart game mode.

=== Brain Games ===
Smart As... contains 5 games in each of the four "brain areas", making for a total of 20 games. The games are based on using different inputs on the PlayStation Vita including front and rear touch functionality, gyroscopic sensors, and AR Card recognition. The "Street Smart" mode uses the Vita's GPS location-based features.

Each game is unlocked for Free Play after performing a Daily Training session. On the first day 4 games are unlocked immediately, with the remaining 16 being unlocked one by one as the user plays the game on the following days. Within the Free Play area, all games have 4 difficulty levels: Easy, Medium, Hard and Genius with the difficulty increasing at each stage.

Most games are scored on the amount of time it takes a user to complete 3-5 rounds of the puzzle. Some games have time penalties for incorrect answers or results. The general principle is that practice will bring familiarity with each game, allowing the user to complete it quickly and accurately for a better brain power score.

==== Arithmetic Games ====
Calculations + This game challenges the player to enter the missing digit from a sum by writing it onto a whiteboard displayed on front screen.

Less Equals More Two digits are shown on screen and the user must decide if the one of the left is less than (<), equal to (=) or more than (>) the number on the right. The user inputs there answer using the front touch screen.

Sum Sequence The user must follow the progression of a sum shown one digit at a time on screen. At the end of each round the user must write the answer to the sum on the board using the front touch screen.

Bubble Sum An AR game challenging the user to point the PlayStation Vita in the air looking for the answers to sums displayed in floating bubbles on the screen. The user must shoot the bubbles in order to complete the sum.

Number Pinch The user is shown two numbers displayed on screen that need to be made by "pinching" liquid bubbles together containing other numbers.

==== Logic Games ====
Roller Blocks This game challenges the player to use the gyroscope feature of the PlayStation Vita in order to roll coloured blocks onto target squares

Chain Reaction The user must connect a series of pegs by drawing lines between them without lines crossing.

Pathfinder The user is shown a playing piece and a series of directions they will travel. They must then raise or lower blocks in order to direct the playing piece to the target.

Cubemania The user must make a path around a 3D cube by rotating tiles using the front touch screen

Live Jigsaw This game takes the live feed from the front and rear camera and breaks up the display into a jigsaw that the user must put back together as quickly as possible.

==== Observation Games ====
Turbo Tap This version of a Stroop test requires that the user touch the front and rear screen as instructed while the directions and instructions appear randomly in different areas of the screen.

Rapid Recall The user is shown a number of objects and must then select them from memory.

Where is it This AR Game sees and item hidden under a cup that is then mixed up with other cups. The user must track the item and select the correct cup at the end of the round.

Boxed In A series of items enter and exit a box randomly. At the end of each round the user must select the items that remain in the box.

Same Different The user is shown two objects on screen which are then replaced with another set of objects. The user has to select whether the objects are the same as, or different from the last two objects in the chain.

==== Language Games ====
Lost Letter The user must enter the missing letter from a word by writing it using the front touch screen.

Odd Word Out The user is shown a set of four words and must choose the Odd Word out as quickly as possible.

Word Wheel A number of letters are dropped onto a wheel in anagram form. The user must rearrange the letters to make a word as quickly as possible.

Spell it The user must correctly spell a word that is spoken to then via the in game narrator.

Alpha Trap This AR Card game sees the user using the rear camera to look for letters positioned above "traps" these letters must be shot using the shoulder buttons in alphabetical order.

== Development ==
The game was developed by Climax Studios and published by XDev Studio Europe. The game was officially announced alongside a brief gameplay demo at Gamescom 2011. The game was shown in more detail at E3 2012 During Gamescom 2012 it was announced that John Cleese would appear in the game as the voice of the narrator.
