= Burt Kwouk =

British actor (1930–2016)

Burt Kwouk OBE
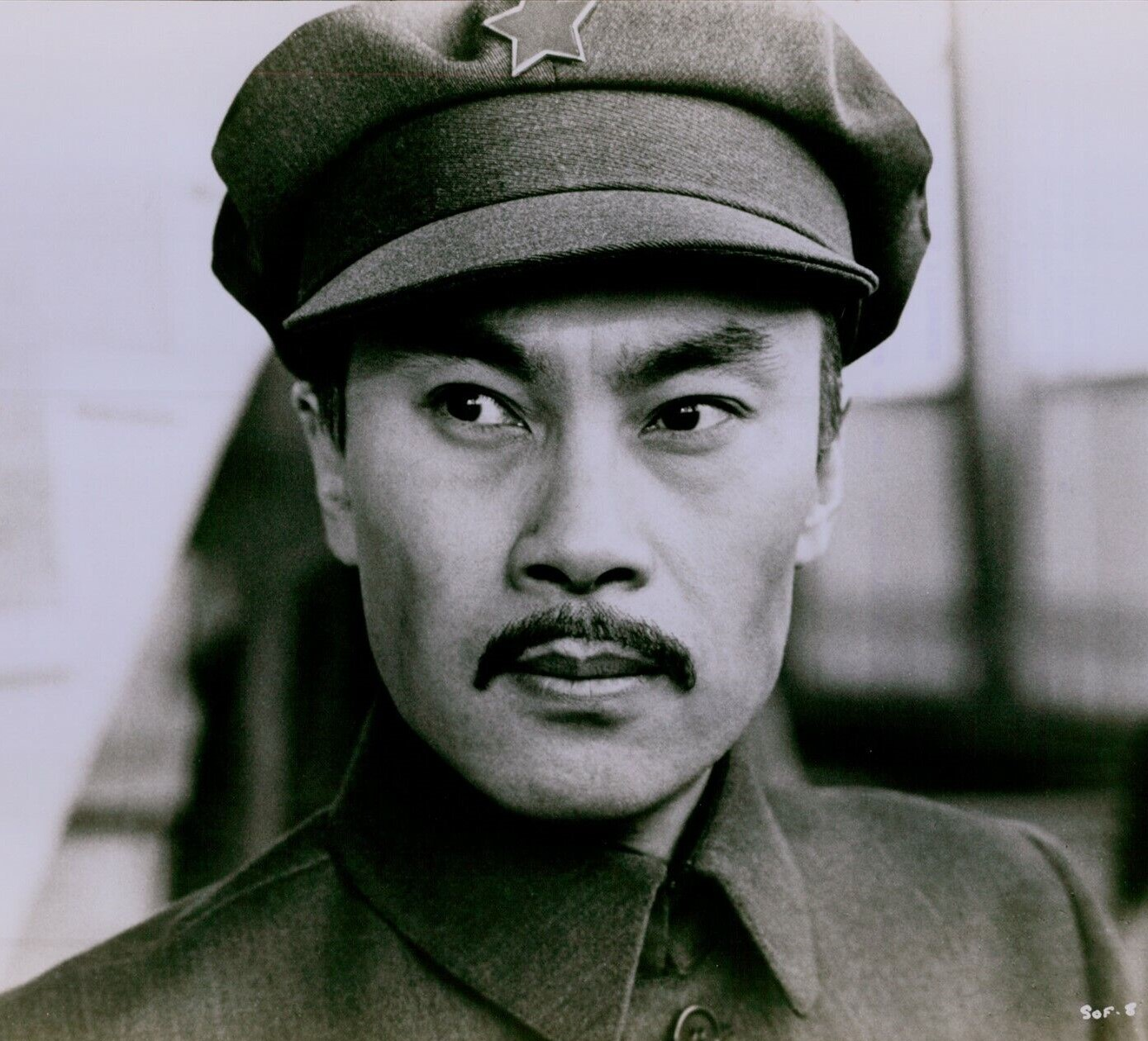
- Kwouk in The Shoes of the Fisherman (1968)
- Born: Herbert Tsangtse Kwouk 郭弼; 18 July 1930; Warrington, Lancashire, England
- Died: 24 May 2016 (aged 85); Hampstead, London, England
- Years active: 1957–2012
- Spouse: Caroline Tebbs (m. 1961)
- Children: 1

Burt Kwouk
- Chinese: 郭弼
Transcriptions
Standard Mandarin
- Hanyu Pinyin: Guō Bì
- Wade–Giles: Ko^{1} Pi^{4}
- IPA: [kwó pî]
Yue: Cantonese
- Jyutping: Gwok^{3} Bat^{6}

Herbert Tsangtse Kwouk (/kwɒk/; Chinese: 郭弼; 18 July 1930 – 24 May 2016) was a British actor. He played Cato in the Pink Panther films. He made appearances in many television programmes, including a portrayal of Imperial Japanese Army Major Yamauchi in the British drama series Tenko, as Entwistle in Last of the Summer Wine and as himself in the Harry Hill Show.

== Early life ==
Kwouk was born on 18 July 1930 in Warrington, Lancashire, while his Chinese parents were on a business trip touring Europe. He was brought up in Shanghai, where his father, descended from a Tang dynasty general, was a textile tycoon. Between the ages of 12 and 16, he attended the Shanghai Jesuit Mission School, which he described as "the Far East equivalent" of Eton College. He left China in 1947 when his parents returned to Britain, and was sent to the United States to complete his education. In 1953, he graduated from Bowdoin College in Brunswick, Maine. The Kwouk family fortune was lost in the Chinese communist revolution in the 1940s. In 1954, he returned to Britain, where a girlfriend "nagged [him] into acting".

== Career ==
Kwouk made his film debut with an uncredited part in Windom's Way (1957). His next film role in The Inn of the Sixth Happiness (1958) was described as his "big break"; Kwouk featured as the leader of a prison revolt who later aids the main starring character Gladys Aylward (Ingrid Bergman) in heroically leading orphans to safety.

Kwouk was best known for playing Cato Fong, Inspector Clouseau's manservant, in the Pink Panther film series. The character was first introduced in A Shot in the Dark (1964), the second film in the series, and was a role that Kwouk would reprise on another six occasions until the 2006 series reboot. The Pink Panther series used a running gag; Cato was ordered to attack Clouseau when he least expected it to keep Clouseau alert, usually resulting in a ruined romantic encounter or Clouseau's flat being damaged or destroyed. Amidst the chaos, the phone would ring and Cato would calmly answer it before dutifully handing the phone to Clouseau who would then give Cato a final assault.

He was a stalwart of several 1960s ITC television series, such as Danger Man, The Saint and Man of the World, when an oriental character was required. He appeared in the episode "Assault Force" in Return of the Saint. Kwouk also featured as one of the leads in the short-lived series The Sentimental Agent (1963) and had minor roles in three James Bond films. In Goldfinger (1964), he played Mr Ling, a Chinese expert in nuclear fission; in the non-Ian Fleming spoof Casino Royale (1967), he played a general; in You Only Live Twice (1967), Kwouk is a Japanese operative of Blofeld, credited as Spectre 3. He also appeared with Laurence Olivier and Anthony Quinn in The Shoes of the Fisherman.

A reference to Kwouk's appearances in several films as Cato with Peter Sellers is found in the opening scene of Seller's last film, The Fiendish Plot of Dr. Fu Manchu (1980) where Sellers, as Fu Manchu says to him "your face is familiar." His next major role was as the honourable but misguided Major Yamauchi in the BBC World War II television drama Tenko (1981–1984). Kwouk featured in many British television productions that called for an Oriental actor. As a result, he became a well-known face in the United Kingdom and appeared as himself in the Harry Hill Show, in addition to supporting several of Hill's live tours. Kwouk had a guest role in Super Gran in 1985, appearing as himself in the episode "Super Gran and the TV Villains". He also played a supportive role in the 1985 RKO film Plenty, portraying a Burmese diplomat at a dinner party.

In 2000, Kwouk appeared in an episode of the syndicated western TV series Queen of Swords as Master Kiyomasa, an aged Japanese warrior-priest; Sung-Hi Lee played his female pupil, Kami. He provided voice-overs on the spoof Japanese betting show Banzai (2001–2004) and subsequently appeared in adverts for the betting company, Bet365. From 2002 to 2010 Kwouk had a regular role as one of the three main characters in the long-running BBC series Last of the Summer Wine, featuring as 'Electrical' Entwistle. His later work also included voice acting for radio drama, video games, and television commercials.

== Personal life ==
Kwouk married Caroline Tebbs in Wandsworth, London, in the summer of 1961. Their son was born in 1974. Kwouk was appointed an Officer of the Order of the British Empire (OBE) in the 2011 New Year Honours for services to drama. In later years, he lived in Hampstead, London.

== Death ==
Kwouk died on 24 May 2016 at the age of 85, from cancer, at the Marie Curie Hospice in Hampstead.

== Selected filmography ==
=== Film ===
Year	Title	Role	Notes
1957	Windom's Way	Father Amyam's aide	Uncredited
1958	The Inn of the Sixth Happiness	Li	
1959	Yesterday's Enemy	Japanese Soldier	
1959	Upstairs and Downstairs	Chinese Restaurant Proprietor	Uncredited
1959	Expresso Bongo	Soho Youth	Uncredited
1960	Passport to China	Jimmy	
1961	The Terror of the Tongs	Mr Ming	
1961	The Sinister Man	Capt. Feng	
1962	Satan Never Sleeps	Ah Weng	
1962	The War Lover	Radio Operator	Uncredited
1963	The Cool Mikado	Art Teacher/Man on Aeroplane	Uncredited
1963	55 Days at Peking	Old Man	Voice
1964	A Shot in the Dark	Cato Fong	
1964	Goldfinger	Mr Ling	
1965	Curse of the Fly	Tai	
1966	Our Man in Marrakesh	Export Manager	
1966	Lost Command	Officer	
1966	The Sandwich Man	Ice Cream Man	
1966	The Brides of Fu Manchu	Feng	
1967	Casino Royale	Chinese General	Uncredited
1967	You Only Live Twice	SPECTRE 3	Dubbed
1968	Nobody Runs Forever	Pam Chimh	
1968	The Shoes of the Fisherman	Chairman Peng	
1969	The Chairman	Chang Shou	
1970	Deep End	Hot Dog Salesman	
1972	Madame Sin	Scarred Operator	
1974	Just One More Time	Sashimi	
1975	The Return of the Pink Panther	Cato Fong	
1975	Rollerball	Japanese Doctor	
1976	The Pink Panther Strikes Again	Cato Fong	
1977	The Last Remake of Beau Geste	Father Shapiro	
1977	The Strange Case of the End of Civilization as We Know It	Chinese Delegate	
1978	Revenge of the Pink Panther	Cato Fong	
1979	The London Connection	Mat at Meeting	Uncredited
1980	The Fiendish Plot of Dr. Fu Manchu	Fu Manchu's Servant	
1982	Trail of the Pink Panther	Cato Fong	
1983	Curse of the Pink Panther	Cato Fong	
1985	Plenty	Mr Aung	
1987	Empire of the Sun	Mr Chen	
1990	I Bought a Vampire Motorcycle	Fu King Owner	
1990	Air America	General Lu Soong	
1992	Police Story 3: Super Cop	General	Uncredited voice
1992	Leon the Pig Farmer	Art Collector	
1992	Carry On Columbus	Wang	
1993	Son of the Pink Panther	Cato Fong	
1997	Peggy Su!	Dad	
2001	Kiss of the Dragon	Uncle Tai	
2003	Beyond Borders	Colonel Gao	
2004	Stratosphere Girl	Papa-San	
2004	Fat Slags	Dalai Lama	
2004	Wake of Death	Tommy Li	

=== Television ===
Year	Title	Role	Notes
1957	Hancock's Half Hour	1st Japanese	Episode: "How to Win Money and Influence People"
1961–1965	The Avengers	Various	3 episodes
1961–1967	Danger Man	Various	5 episodes
1961	The Edgar Wallace Mystery Theater	Captain Feng	Episode: "The Sinister Man"
1962	Man of the World	Liu	Episode: "The Frontier"
1963	Compact	Chinese Waiter	Episode: "Chicken and Champange"
1963	The Sentimental Agent	Chin	12 episodes
1965–1968	The Saint	Various	3 episodes
1965	Out of the Unknown	Novee	Episode: "Sucker Bait"
1966	BBC Play of the Month	Wu Hsien Cheng	Episode: "The Devil's Eggshell"
1967	The Champions	Chinese Major	Episode: "The Beginning"
1967–1969	Callan	Robert E. Lee/Tao Tsing	2 episodes
1970	The Misfit	Barman	Episode: "On Being British"
1971	ITV Playhouse	The Prisoner	Episode: "The Switch"
1972	Shirley's World	Shunji	2 episodes
1972	Jason King	Lee Chang	Episode: "Every Picture Tells a Story"
1972–1973	The Adventurer	Johnny Morrison/Taiho	2 episodes
1975	Whodunnit?	Dr. Ling	Episode: "Evidence of Death"
1975–1976	Lucky Feller	Chinese Waiter/Wedding Guest	3 episodes
1976	Yes, Honestly	Ning Ning	Episode: "Black and White and Red All Over"
1976	The Melting Pot		4 episodes
1976–1978	The Water Margin	Narrator	English dub
1977	Warship	Foreign Minister Zee Khay Lim	Episode: "Diplomatic Package"
1977–1978	It Ain't Half Hot Mum	Me Thant	2 episodes
1978	The Tomorrow People	Matsu Tan	Serial: "The Lost Gods"
1978	Return of the Saint	Chula	Episode: "Assault Force"
1978–1979	Monkey Magic	Narrator	English dub
1979	Robin's Nest	Barman	Episode: "Sorry Partner"
1980	Keep It in the Family	Japanese Juror/Maitre 'd	2 episodes
1980	Shoestring	Mr Wing	Episode: "The Dangerous Game"
1980	Minder	Sojo	Episode: "A Nice Little Wine"
1981–1984	Tenko	Major Yamauchi	19 episodes
1982	Doctor Who	Lin Futu	Serial: "Four to Doomsday"
1983	Hart to Hart	Toshi	Episode: "Passing Chance"
1984	Hammer House of Mystery and Suspense	Lee	Episode: "Mark of the Devil"
1986–1987	Tickle on the Tum	Willie Wok	2 episodes
1987	Howards' Way	Lee	3 episodes
1987	T-Bag Bounces Back	Hi Hatt	Episode: "Hi Hatt Bounces Back"
1988	Noble House	Phillip Chen	Miniseries
1989	Boon	Van Der Haan	Episode: "The Not So Lone Ranger"
1991	The House of Eliott	Peter Lo Chen	3 episodes
1992–1993	Lovejoy	Banker/Mr Ying	2 episodes
1994	Space Precinct	Slik Ostrasky	Episode: "Protect and Survive"
1995	Bullet to Beijing	Kim Soo	TV film
1997–2000	The Harry Hill Show	Himself	
2000	Arabian Nights	Caliph Beder	Miniseries
2001	Queen of Swords	Master Kiyomassa	Episode: "The Dragon"
2001	Banzai	Narrator	
2002–2010	Last of the Summer Wine	Entwistle	Seasons 24–31
2003–2005	The Bill	Father Kwong/George Sim	3 episodes
2005	Judge John Deed	Professor Vang Pao	Episode: "Separation of Powers"
2006	Silent Witness	Jimmy Han	Episode: "Cargo"
2006	Doctors	Mr Chang	Episode: "Sleepless in Selly Heath"
2008	Honest	Mr Hong	5 episodes
2009	Spirit Warriors	Shen	4 episodes
2012	Whatever Happened to Harry Hill	Himself	

=== Audio theatre ===
- Doctor Who: Loups-Garoux (2001) as Doctor Hayashi

=== Video games ===
Year	Title	Role
2003	Fire Warrior	El'Lusha
2003	EyeToy: Play	Notes

=== Miscellaneous ===
- Film trailer – Monty Python and the Holy Grail (1974) as Asian Voiceover Announcer
- A 17-minute interview with Burt Kwouk from 2010 about his appearances in ITC shows is featured on the Network DVD The Sentimental Agent.
