= Harry Hill's TV Burp =

- Genre: Comedy clip show
- Created by: Harry Hill
- Written by: Harry Hill, with assistance from the TV Burp writing team
- Directed by: Peter Orton
- Presented by: Harry Hill
- Composer: Steve Brown
- Country of origin: United Kingdom
- Original language: English
- No. of series: 11
- No. of episodes: 161 (plus 5 specials)

Production
- Executive producer: Harry Hill
- Producers: Patricia McGowan (2001); Nick Symons (2002–2006); Spencer Millman (2007–2012)
- Production locations: Teddington Studios (2001–2009); BBC Television Centre (2009–2012)
- Camera setup: Multi-camera
- Running time: 25 minutes
- Production company: Avalon Television

Original release
- Network: ITV1
- Release: 22 December 2001 – 7 April 2012

Related
- TV Burp (Australian TV series); Harry Hill; You Cannot Be Serious!; Harry Hill's Alien Fun Capsule; Harry Hill's World of TV

Harry Hill's TV Burp (also referred to as TV Burp) is a British television comedy clip show hosted by the comedian Harry Hill and produced by Avalon Television for ITV. The show's format sees Hill take a comedic look over a previous week's schedule of television programming across a range of genres, with episodes often featuring sketches and parodied scenes.

Much of its comedy derives from taking scenes out of context or highlighting unintentionally comedic moments, with frequent uses of callbacks and in-jokes. The programme often featured in-studio appearances from the people in its clips and television personalities, with a guest from one of the show's clips usually appearing to do a musical performance to finish the episode. Production of each episode primarily required Hill and his writing team to review preview tapes for a week's television schedule in advance to provide the foundation for the script of that week's episode.

TV Burp was aired on ITV1 between 2001 and 2012, when Hill left the show due to the intense workload reviewing clips to write the show. The show aired on Thursday nights for the first three series, before moving to Saturday evenings from series 4 onwards. It was critically acclaimed and won numerous awards, including three BAFTA TV Awards, a Rose d'Or for best comedy performance, and multiple British Comedy Awards. Although it initially struggled with viewing figures, it later became one of the most watched shows on British television and reached eight million viewers at its peak. An Australian version of the programme was made in 2009 for Seven Network.

== Format ==
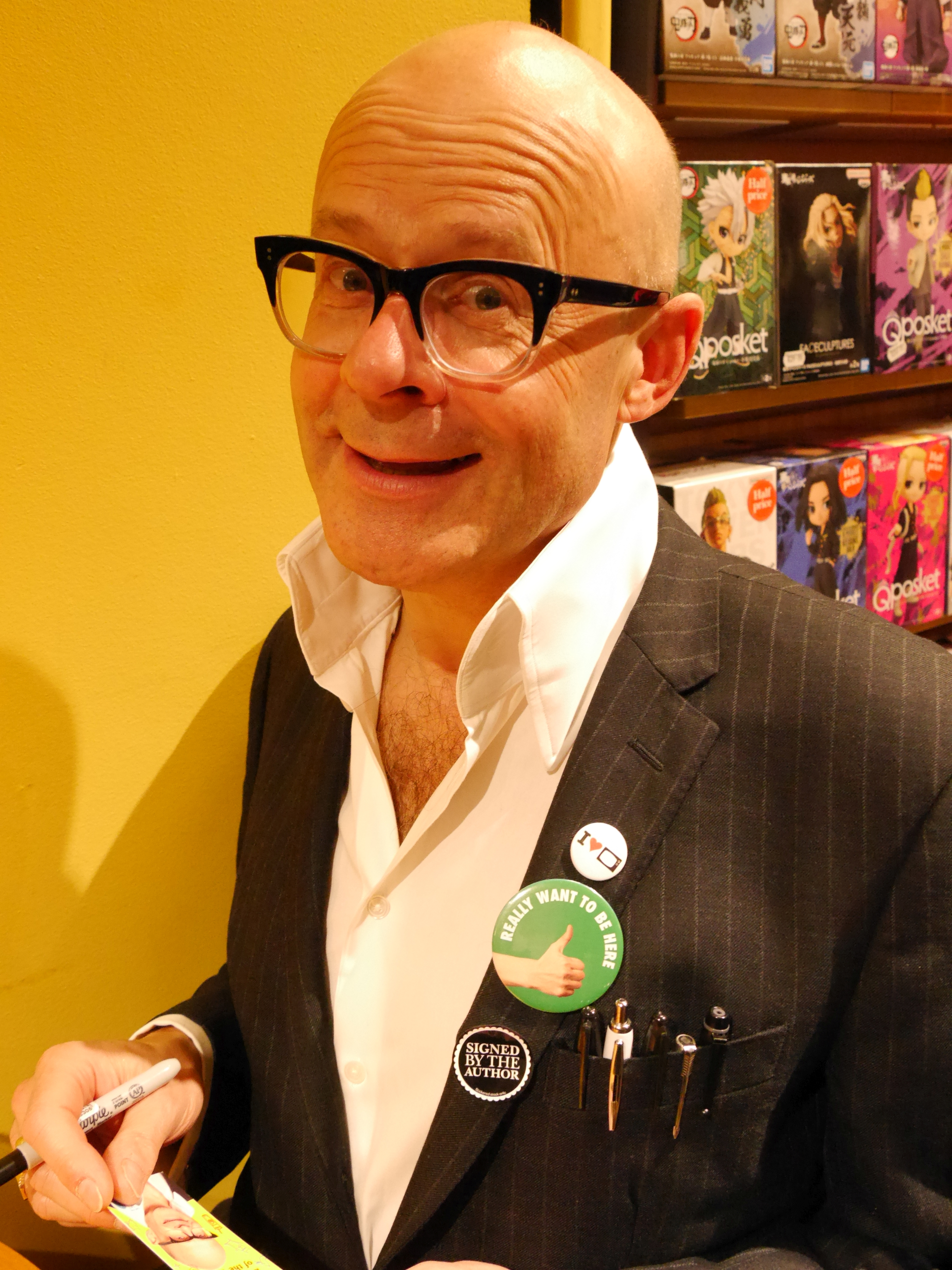
Harry Hill (pictured in 2024) presented TV Burp wearing a distinctive oversized collar and large black glasses

TV Burp is a clip show that features the alternative comedian Harry Hill taking a comedic look over a week's schedule of programming, focusing on scenes from a selection of television shows, including dramas, soap operas, documentaries, cooking shows, game shows, and reality TV. Hill presents the show from a desk in front of a studio audience, introducing and commenting on clips while dressed in a suit with an oversized collar and large black glasses.

Clips are usually taken out of context or highlight a moment that was unintentionally funny, often focusing on insignificant or background details. Sometimes the continuity of the clips is extended, either by re-editing the existing footage to include Hill, or by the appearance of props and characters in the TV Burp studio. Cameos in other television programmes and video messages from celebrities are also sometimes featured. In earlier series, more studio segments and sketches were featured, but these reduced for later series to retain a focus on clips.

Jokes and sketches are delivered at a fast pace, allowing Hill to move onto new clips in quick succession, with repeated callbacks feeding into Hill's "comic strategy of accumulating non-sequiturs until they acquire an air of logic". These callbacks would often morph into series-long catchphrases and in-jokes, setting up larger pay-offs in later episodes. Recurring characters were also common, including puppets, a wobbling jelly, and parodic versions of TV characters. Childish humour, silliness, surrealism, slapstick, and physical humour are all common features, with influences from variety show and carnival-style entertainment.

Recurring segments included a slapstick fight before the advert break introduced by Hill stating that he liked two separate things before asking "But which is better? Only one way to find out! Fight!"; "TV Highlight of the Week" showing an often inconsequential moment from a show; and an ending musical performance by a guest from one of the episode's clips.

== History and production ==
Hill initially conceived of TV Burp after being invited to contribute as a guest editor to The Sun's television review column, thinking he could expand his ideas into a television show about television similar to In Bed with Medinner. He first pitched the show to the BBC before turning to ITV. Following a successful pilot broadcast on ITV1 on 22 December 2001, a series was commissioned and the first episode aired on 14 November 2002. The show was produced for ITV by Avalon Television.

The show was written by Hill with assistance from a writing team; writers varied across the show's run but Hill described the core team as Brenda Gilhooly, Paul Hawksbee, Daniel Maier, and David Quantick. Hill and the writing team would watch hours of television from preview tapes to find material. Clips were licensed from ITV and Channel 4 but the BBC did not offer licensing for the clips from its shows; beginning in series two, clips from BBC shows were included under the principle of fair dealing.

Initially, ITV was unsure how to schedule the show and its first few series were broadcast in a late night slot on Thursdays. Viewing figures were low for these first few series and Hill has said the show was continuously at risk of cancellation around this time. ITV asked Hill to do An Audience with... show prior to start of the fourth series to increase anticipation; Hill did not want to do the show but reluctantly agreed. The fourth series was also moved to an early evening teatime slot and ratings improved. According to an interview with Hill in The Guardian, most viewers only became aware of the show by the sixth series in 2007. The show was moved to the Saturday prime time slot for the ninth series in 2009. The success of the show led to Hill presenting You've Been Framed! and TV Burp in adjacent slots during ITV's Saturday night prime time.

In 2010, ITV signed a deal with Avalon and Hill to produce two more series of the show from 2010 to 2012. By 2011 there were reports that Hill was planning to quit the show after this deal expired and the show ended in 2012. Hill had reportedly been offered a "golden handcuffs" deal worth millions of pounds, but Hill denied these claims saying they had been exaggerated. Hill had wanted the show to continue and asked fellow comedian Peter Kay to replace him as the show's host, but he turned down the offer. Hill left the show in part due to the intense workload it required to watch hours of television for seconds-long clips, which had worsened as the show had gained popularity and series extended in length. While earlier series had been just six to eight episodes long, later series were up to 25 episodes.

== Reception ==
=== Critical reception ===
TV Burp received positive feedback from critics. Mark Lawson from The Guardian said in 2008 it was "the freshest and most original show in mainstream television" and across 2008 and 2009 it was listed as one of the best shows on TV in The Telegraph and The Times. Simon Hoggart, writing in The Spectator, commended the show for "[assailing] everything on television that is stupid, shoddy, lazy, contemptuous of the audience and generally rubbish". Andrew Mickel from Den of Geek praised the fast pace of the gags but felt the show relied too heavily on ITV soap operas. In a review for a TV Burp box set released in 2010, Tim Lusher said its skits were "timeless" and called the show "exuberantly daft, and mischievous but affectionate".

Writing at the time of the show's final series in 2012, Bruce Dessau said that the show's quality had varied over its run, but at its best it had managed to create an "across-the-board appeal" reminiscent of The Simpsons. Ultimately, he felt the show would "be sorely missed" and that "ITV will never be the same again". Mark Smith from The Herald was also disappointed for the show to end, citing Hill's ability to make viewers see things from a new perspective and his celebration of the silliness of television. David Bowden for Spiked concurred that TV Burp had attained an appeal for "all the family", but felt its true achievement was as "one of the great biting critics of twenty-first-century popular entertainment".

In a retrospective for the i newspaper, Alex Nelson praised TV Burp's "electric pace" and the originality of its approach to clip shows. He also felt the show avoided a judgmental tone by targeting low- and high-brow entertainment equally. Another retrospective for The Guardian by Rich Pelley called the show a "TV masterclass" but argued that the quality declined in later seasons due to the increased number of episodes and hence increased workload on Hill and the show's other writers.

=== Public response and popularity ===
Although viewing figures were initially low, the popularity of the show increased over time. The debut episode was watched by almost 3 million people. By 2008, it was averaging over 6 million viewers per episode and at its peak it was watched by more than 8 million people. The final series opened with 5.45 million viewers, taking a 22.6% audience share.

In 2007, Ofcom ruled that TV Burp had breached guidelines by including clips from a Bear Grylls programme that were inappropriately scheduled for its early evening show time and family audiences, including clips that featured Grylls eating a frog and cooking a turtle. Another clip, which had been broadcast in 2008 and cleared by Ofcom at the time, was banned after being repeated by digital channel Dave in 2016. The clip featured a comedic review of a Channel 4 documentary about Thomas Beatie, a transgender man, and was ruled "highly offensive to the transgender community" by Ofcom.

== Influence ==
According to the television studies scholar James Leggott, TV Burp was "one of the most popular and long-running British comedy series of the noughties". The Telegraph similarly listed TV Burp as one of the 100 television shows that defined the 2000s. The show was briefly portrayed at the London 2012 Summer Olympics opening ceremony during a section celebrating British music and popular culture since the 1960s. It was portrayed as "a 'typical' British Saturday evening, [where] television was a cultural form bringing the family together".

The television studies scholar Leon Hunt states that TV Burp is seen as one of Harry Hill's biggest successes and "turned a critically disparaged genre, the clip show, into one of the most consistently inspired comedy shows on TV." Leggott identified TV Burp as being influential in the clip show genre for focusing on everyday programmes, instead of unknown or unreleased clips as previous clip shows had done. Its comedy also moved away from bloopers and mistakes towards comedic commentary and a focus on "the grammar of television".

TV Burp also had influence on TV shows outside the genre of clip shows. It influenced other shows, such as Come Dine with Me and The Only Way Is Essex, to include ironic voiceovers to pre-empt any mockery that could be directed towards them. Its popularity led to increased success of the shows it satirised; the BBC Three show Freaky Eaters was commissioned for another series due to it being covered extensively on TV Burp. An Australian version of TV Burp presented by Ed Kavalee was created for Seven Network in 2009.

== Awards and nominations ==
Year	Group	Award	Result	Ref.
2004	Rose d'Or	Best Comedy Performance: Male	Won	
2006	British Comedy Awards	Best Comedy Entertainment Programme	Won	
2007	National Television Awards	Most Popular Comedy Programme	Nominated	
2007	RTS Awards	Entertainment Performance	Nominated	
2007	British Comedy Awards	Best Comedy Entertainment Programme	Nominated	
2008	British Academy Television Awards	Best Entertainment Programme	Won	
2008	British Academy Television Awards	Best Entertainment Performance	Won	
2008	RTS Awards	Entertainment Performance	Won	
2008	National Television Awards	Most Popular Comedy Programme	Nominated	
2008	British Comedy Awards	Best Comedy Entertainment Programme	Won	
2009	British Academy Television Awards	Best Entertainment Programme	Nominated	
2009	British Academy Television Awards	Best Entertainment Performance	Won	
2009	RTS Awards	Entertainment	Won	
2009	RTS Awards	Entertainment Performance	Nominated	
2009	TRIC Awards	Entertainment Programme	Nominated	
2009	British Comedy Awards	Best Comedy Entertainment Programme	Won	
2010	National Television Awards	Most Popular Comedy Programme	Nominated	
2010	British Academy Television Awards	Best Entertainment Programme	Nominated	
2010	British Academy Television Awards	Best Entertainment Performance	Nominated	
2010	RTS Awards	Entertainment Performance	Won	
2011	National Television Awards	Most Popular Comedy Programme	Nominated	
2011	British Academy Television Awards	Best Entertainment Performance	Nominated	
2011	TRIC Awards	Entertainment Programme	Nominated	
2011	British Comedy Awards	Best Comedy Entertainment Programme	Nominated	
2011	British Comedy Awards	Best Comedy Entertainment Personality	Nominated	
2011	British Comedy Awards	Best Male TV Comic	Nominated	
2012	National Television Awards	Best Entertainment Programme	Nominated	
2012	British Academy Television Awards	Best Entertainment Programme	Nominated	
2012	British Academy Television Awards	Best Entertainment Performance	Nominated	
2012	TRIC Awards	Entertainment Programme	Nominated	
2012	British Comedy Awards	Best Comedy Entertainment Programme	Won	
2012	British Comedy Awards	Best Comedy Entertainment Personality	Nominated	
2012	British Comedy Awards	Best Male TV Comic	Nominated	

== Transmissions ==
=== Series ===
Series	Start date	End date	Episodes (Note: Including "Best of" episodes and Christmas specials)
Pilot	22 December 2001		
1	14 November 2002	19 December 2002	6
2	30 October 2003	18 December 2003	8
3	20 February 2004	2 April 2004	7
4	23 October 2004	27 November 2004	6
5	21 January 2006	25 March 2006	10
6	30 December 2006	14 April 2007	14
7	25 December 2007	5 April 2008	14
8	18 October 2008	4 April 2009	25
9	10 October 2009	10 April 2010	25
10	9 October 2010	2 April 2011	21
11	8 October 2011	7 April 2012	24

=== Specials ===
From 2005 to 2011, the biennial BBC One transmission of the Red Nose Day telethon in aid of Comic Relief included a short TV Burp segment. Hill also recorded a short TV Burp segment for Blue Peter in February 2009.

Date	Special
11 March 2005	Comic Relief 2005
16 March 2007	Comic Relief 2007
4 February 2009	Blue Peter 2009
13 March 2009	Comic Relief 2009
18 March 2011	Comic Relief 2011 (crossover with Autumnwatch)

== Repeats and home media ==
The inclusion of a large amount of material to which ITV and Avalon do not hold the rights has caused difficulties for repeats and "Best of" releases. However, in 2009, the first The Best of TV Burp was played on ITV1, which featured clips from previous episodes. As of 4 April 2012, 24 Best of TV Burp episodes have been aired, in addition to a Best of Christmas TV Burp episode featuring clips from Christmas episodes of the show. In October 2011, Cartoon Network began airing a similar format (alongside Hill's Shark Infested Custard), in which they took past episodes of the series and edited segments together to make the series more child-friendly, but did not record any new segments. The show was repeated in full on Rewind TV beginning in September 2026.

Multiple TV Burp compilation DVDs have been released. A tie-in book Harry Hill's TV Burp Book was also released in 2009. Another tie-in book based on TV Burp's The X Factor parody and knitting contest "The K Factor" was released in 2011.

TV Burp compilation DVDs
Title	Duration	Classification	Release date
Harry Hill's TV Burp Gold	61 minutes Extras run time 30 mins	12	10 November 2008
Harry Hill's TV Burp Gold 2	61 minutes Extras run time 32 mins	12	9 November 2009
Harry Hill's TV Burp Gold 3	64 minutes Extras run time 72 mins	PG	1 November 2010
Harry Hill's TV Burp: The Best Bits	60 minutes Extras run time 41 mins	12	14 November 2011
Harry Hill's Cream Of TV Burp	63 minutes Extras run time 24 mins	PG	26 November 2012

== See also ==
- The Soup, a similar show in the US
