= You've Been Framed! =

British television series

- You've Been Framed logo from 2014 to 2022
- Genre: Comedy; Clip show
- Based on: Fun TV with Kato-chan and Ken-chan
- Presented by: Jeremy Beadle; Lisa Riley; Jonathan Wilkes
- Voices of: Andrew Brittain
- Narrated by: Harry Hill
- Composer: Ray Monk
- Country of origin: United Kingdom
- Original language: English
- No. of series: 31
- No. of episodes: 701

Production
- Production locations: Granada Studios (1990–2004)
- Running time: 30–60 minutes (inc. adverts)
- Production companies: Granada Television (1990–2006); ITV Productions (2006–2009); ITV Studios Entertainment (2009–2022)

Original release
- Network: ITV
- Release: 14 April 1990 – 27 August 2022

Related
- Animals Do the Funniest Things; Kirsty's Home Videos; The Planet's Funniest Animals

You've Been Framed! was a British television programme where viewers contributed to the programme with their humorous home movies for the entertainment of others. The series began on 14 April 1990 and ended on the 27th August 2022, officially being axed in 2023.

== History ==
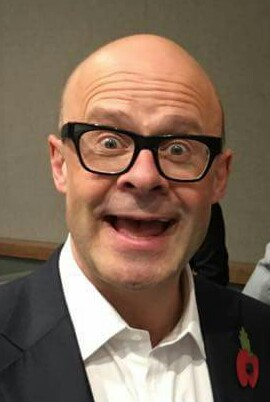
Harry Hill pictured in 2016. Hill was the Narrator from 2004 until the show ended in 2022.

The show's format is based on the Japanese show Fun TV with Kato-chan and Ken-chan (1986), which was also the basis for America's Funniest Home Videos (1989). The show is also similar in format to a number of other shows worldwide, such as Australia's Funniest Home Video Show (1991). In a deal with various foreign producers of similar shows, many imported clips are used, in exchange for home-grown videos from the United Kingdom.

The show was first commissioned as a pilot and aired on ITV on 14 April 1990 with Jeremy Beadle as the host; a second pilot was also commissioned and aired on 1 September 1990. Both pilots were a success, with a full series commissioned, which began airing on 6 January 1991. The early Beadle era featured more audience participation: for example, brief interviews with people who had been featured in clips, and the audience voting for their favourite clip at the end of each show, with the winners throughout the series going through to the final, in a bid to win a £5,000 cash prize at the end of the series.

The show was referenced in the closing episode of Bottom, "Carnival", in 1995 with the name Jeremy Beadle's Viciously Hilarious Violent Domestic Incidents, for which the lead characters Richie and Eddie tried to film a fake clip they would later submit for it. A segment was introduced showcasing clips which had obviously been faked, called "Named, Framed and Shamed!", which ended when the studio was ditched in favour of an apartment setting later on when Jonathan Wilkes was presenting. This segment was also tried out during the Beadle era, under the name 'Dodgy Clip Alert'. Another parody of the series, You've Been Filmed!, featured as a short clip from the "Clip Round" in a 2009 episode of comedy panel show Shooting Stars, where the comedians from the series appeared in their own clearly faked video clips.

The format was tweaked in later years, and the studio set and logo changed several times. Lisa Riley took over the role as host, after Beadle was dismissed from the role in 1998. While the programme was presented by Jonathan Wilkes, who replaced Riley in 2003, the feature where the studio audience voted for which clip was the best of the show returned, under the name 'Clip for a Trip', with the person who sent in the winning clip receiving £1,000.

In Autumn 2004, visual continuity was replaced with a narrator, voiced by Harry Hill, which meant that for the first time since the show began, there was no longer a studio set, audience or on-screen personality. Hill provides humorous commentary on the clips via voice-over, which means more clips can be shown. This also uses a short version of a short-lived 2003 intro, which was used in the Jonathan Wilkes era, and was used until 2007.

In the series' ninth year of transmission, ITV started another home videos series, Animals Do the Funniest Things featuring humorous clips of animals, which, although originally produced by LWT when it was first broadcast in 1999, was produced by Granada Television from 2002, therefore becoming Granada's second home video television series after You've Been Framed!.

Submission of clips to You've Been Framed! is free of postage, and in later years, the show began accepting clips via e-mail, and more lately, the inclusion of mobile phone videos; noted on-screen by a small mobile symbol in the corner of the screen, resembling a digital on-screen graphic. Originally, £100 was paid for every submitted clip that was shown. This was soon increased to £250 where it remained for the rest of the show's run. Granada Reports newsreader Andrew Brittain was a regular announcer from 1991 until the end of the Jonathan Wilkes era in 2003 when he left Granada Reports.

In later series, Hill made regular obtuse references to the Norfolk market town of Swaffham, in reprisal of the serious injuries he once received in a bizarre bird attack in the town. Additionally, whenever a woman vaguely resembles former host Lisa Riley, Hill referred to her as his "arch-nemesis". The latter was an example of how many of Hill's commentaries refer to people vaguely resembling celebrities as such celebrities. Even if someone resembles Hill, he will refer to himself as the person in the clip. For a period when Hill's television series Harry Hill's TV Burp was produced, the latter show would be broadcast directly after You've Been Framed! on ITV1, and Hill would occasionally make references to the consecutive scheduling on Harry Hill's TV Burp. The latter show's official book also features a section dedicated to You've Been Framed!, where Hill refers to it as "your second favourite show on television".

On 21 February 2023, ITV announced that there would be no new series that year, and that there were no plans for it to return in 2024.

== Format ==
During the show, the video clips are played and the people who sent them in receive £250. Just before the advert break, viewer-participation competitions are started, and then are concluded when the programme resumes; examples of these include the "What Happens Next?" competition where the viewers have to guess what happens after a clip is frozen is started, the "Framed Gold Records" competition, where viewers have to guess how many times something can happen before something else happens (for example, "How many people can fall over before a dog gets through a very tight space?"), or "Are you a cry baby? Maybe." competition, in which viewers guess if there will be tears before bedtime, is played. The answer is revealed after the break.

The video clips are normally sorted into separate categories, with examples being categories based on animals, humorous things children say, or embarrassing situations at weddings. Some of the categories let their clips play with humorous commentary from Harry Hill, whilst others have consistent musical backing, so that the clips can be seen as forming a sort of music video. Generally, the soundtrack choice is relevant to the subject of the category (for example, "What's New Pussycat?" once played over a category on cat videos). The musical categories also feature shorter clips than the commentary categories, as the latter will often feature more of what happens before and after the incident in the clip to accommodate Hill's commentary.

Episodes will typically begin with Hill announcing what is "coming up" in the episode, showing three brief clips, before segueing into the title sequence, although these openings could be considered part of the title sequence. This is a departure to episodes in the Jeremy Beadle/Lisa Riley eras, which used to contain cold openings showing all of a clip without any voice-over.

Sometimes, special editions featuring countdown or "A-Z" lists will be produced, which mostly reuse older clips. There have been approximately 67 specials, and are especially common in the current day.

== Transmissions ==
=== Series ===
==== Jeremy Beadle era (1990–1997) ====
Series	Start date	End date	Episodes
Pilots	14 April 1990	1 September 1990	2
1	6 January 1991	28 February 1991	8
2	12 January 1992	1 March 1992	8
3	6 September 1992	11 October 1992	6
4	10 January 1993	29 May 1993	9
5	3 October 1993	19 December 1993	11
6	4 September 1994	17 December 1994	16
7	3 September 1995	19 November 1995	12
8	1 September 1996	15 December 1996	14
9	14 September 1997	7 December 1997	13

==== Lisa Riley era (1998–2002) ====
Series	Start date	End date	Episodes
10	4 September 1998	24 October 1998	8
11	17 July 1999	28 June 2000	23
12	2 September 2000	28 June 2001	17
13	21 October 2001	22 December 2001	10
14	8 September 2002	24 November 2002	12

==== Jonathan Wilkes era (2003–2004) ====
Series	Start date	End date	Episodes
15	12 October 2003	2 May 2004	30

==== Harry Hill era (2004–2022) ====
Series	Start date	End date	Episodes
16	11 September 2004	23 April 2005	22
17	10 September 2005	23 September 2006	22
18	30 September 2006	9 June 2007	22
19	14 July 2007	18 August 2007	4
20	25 August 2007	11 May 2008	24
21	28 June 2008	11 April 2009	27
22	10 October 2009	13 November 2010	26
23	20 November 2010	22 October 2011	26
24	19 November 2011	18 August 2012	26
25	1 September 2012	7 September 2013	26
26	14 September 2013	7 June 2014	26
27	27 September 2014	16 May 2015	19
28	25 December 2015	18 June 2016	19
29	25 December 2016	2 April 2020	19
30	23 December 2017	30 October 2021	24
31	23 April 2020	27 August 2022	24

==== Specials ====
Throughout its run since its debut in 1990, You've Been Framed! has featured several spin-off specials (often reusing clips from previous shows):

- 100% You've Been Framed! (22 October 2011)
- Best of You've Been Framed! (24 April 2010)
- Funniest Ever You've Been Framed! (27 October–1 December 2007)
- Ultimate You've Been Framed! (24 September 2011)
- I Love YBF! (29 December 2012)
- Totally You've Been Framed! (4–25 October 2008, 5 December 2009)
- The Best of You've Been Framed! (31 December 2005)
- Very Best of You've Been Framed! (31 December 2006)
- The Guide to You've Been Framed! (27 August 2011)
- You've Been Framed! A-Z (13 September 2008)
- You've Been Framed! A-Z of Christmas (25 December 2002)
- You've Been Framed and Famous! (20 December 2009, 8 June 2011, 17 December 2011)
- You've Been Framed and Famous! 4 (13 April 2013)
- You've Been Framed! Best of the Best (1 March 2014)
- You've Been Framed at Christmas! (1991, 1994–95, 1998–2001, 2003–05, 2008–09, 2011–14)
- United: You've Been Framed! (29 May 1993)
- You've Been Framed! Calendar Special (23 December 2006)
- You've Been Framed! Family Special (27 September 2008)
- You've Been Framed! Favourites (27 April 2013)
- You've Been Framed! Forever! (20 April 2013)
- You've Been Framed and Extreme! (17 April 2010)
- You've Been Framed! Full Throttle! (26 May 2012)
- You've Been Framed! Funniest 100 (20 September 2008)
- You've Been Framed! Harry's Favourites (28 January 2012)
- You've Been Framed! Holiday Special (22 April 2006)
- You've Been Framed! in Lapland (17 December 1994)
- You've Been Framed! Kids Special (23 April 2005, 29 January 2006, 17 March 2007, 6 January 2010)
- You've Been Framed! Late! (3 January 1993)
- You've Been Framed Rides Again! (18 August 2012)
- You've Been Framed! Sports' Special (17 December 2005)
- You've Been Framed! Animal Special (18 December 2004, 21 April 2007)
- You've Been Framed! Showbiz Special (8 January 2005)
- You've Been Framed! Top 10s (17 September 2011)
- You've Been Framed! The Next Generation (12 January 2013)
- You've Been Framed! Top 100 Animals (1 January 2012)
- You've Been Framed! Top 100 Holidays (26 January 2013)
- You've Been Framed! Top 100 Kids (4 February 2012)
- You've Been Framed! Top 100 Talent (2 February 2013)
- You've Been Framed! Top 100 Weddings (19 January 2013)
- You've Been Framed! Strikes Back! (8 March 2014)
- You've Been Framed! Top 100 Senior Moments (15 March 2014)
- You've Been Framed! A-Z of Animals (22 March 2014)
- You've Been Framed! Top 100 Shockers (29 March 2014)
- You've Been Framed! Presents (5 April 2014)
- You've Been Framed! Top 100 Sportstars (11 April 2015)
- You've Been Framed! A-Z of Growing Up (18 April 2015)
- You've Been Framed! Yearbook (25 April 2015)
- You've Been Framed! Unleashed! (2 May 2015)
- You've Been Framed! Reloaded! (9 May 2015)
- You've Been Framed! Hall of Framed (16 May 2015)
- You've Been Framed! with Bells on! (25 December 2015)
- You've Been Framed! XXL (9 April 2016)
- You've Been Framed! Goes Wild! (16 April 2016)
- You've Been Framed! Supreme! (23 April 2016)
- You've Been Framed! Bites Back! (30 April 2016)
- You've Been Framed! Finest (7 May 2016)
- You've Been Framed! Bounces Back! (14 May 2016)
- You've Been Framed! Harry's Naughty List (25 December 2016)
- You've Been Framed! Unchained (7 January 2017)
- You've Been Framed! and Fearless! (21 January 2017)
- You've Been Framed! King-Size! (28 January 2017)
- You've Been Framed! to the Max! (11 February 2017)
- You've Been Framed! Unlimited (25 March 2017)
- You've Been Framed! Let Loose! (1 April 2017)
- You've Been Framed! Unwrapped (23 December 2017)
- You've Been Framed! Christmas Crackers (25 December 2020)
- You've Been Framed! Goes Large! (2 May 2021)
- You've Been Framed! Goes Savage! (8 May 2021)
- You've Been Framed! Attacks! (25 September 2021)
- You've Been Framed! Unstoppable! (2 October 2021)
- You've Been Framed! Uncaged! (9 October 2021)
- You've Been Framed! No Limits! (24 October 2021)
- You've Been Framed! And Fabulous (30 October 2021)
- You've Been Framed! And Furious! (6 August 2022)
- You've Been Framed! On a Roll! (13 August 2022)
- You've Been Framed! 5-Star Fails (20 August 2022)
- You've Been Framed! Super-Size! (27 August 2022)
