= Harry Hill (TV series) =

Television series

- Title card (1997–2000)
- Also known as: The All-New Harry Hill Show
- Created by: Harry Hill
- Starring: Harry Hill; Barrie Gosney; Al Murray; Burt Kwouk
- Country of origin: United Kingdom
- Original language: English
- No. of series: 3 (Channel 4); 1 (ITV)
- No. of episodes: 27 (Channel 4); 6 (ITV)

Production
- Producer: Avalon Television
- Running time: 25 minutes (Channel 4); 30 minutes (ITV)

Original release
- Network: Channel 4 (1997–2000); ITV (2003)
- Release: 30 May 1997 – 16 March 2003

Related
- Harry Hill's TV Burp; Fruit Fancies

Harry Hill, later titled The All-New Harry Hill Show and also referred to as The Harry Hill Show, is a British stand-up comedy sketch show, starring comedian Harry Hill, that ran for four series from 1997 to 2003, on both Channel 4 and ITV.

== Broadcast ==
=== Channel 4 (1997–2000) ===
The original Channel 4 series of Harry Hill was commissioned on the back of the success of Fruit Fancies, a series of six short comedy films written and performed by Hill, which were broadcast on BBC Two, and a sell-out theatre tour in 1996 which was given excellent reviews by critics and fans alike. The Channel 4 series was commissioned in January 1997. The programme's title, as shown in the title sequence, was simply Harry Hill, but was often referred to, in some programme listings, as The Harry Hill Show.

As well as writing and producing the majority of the show's material himself, the Channel 4 version of the series also featured regular performances from Al Murray, who played Harry's older brother, Alan, Burt Kwouk, who appeared as himself, Steve Bowditch, who played Harry's chief scientist, Finsbury Park, and Matt Bradstock, who played Harry's three year old adopted son, Alan Hill Jr. Each episode was introduced by Barrie Gosney.

Each episode would also include regular features, such as Burt Kwouk performing "Hey Little Hen", the Badger Parade, Harry reading the news disguised as Zeinab Badawi, and occasionally, a tale from Nana Hill, Harry's eighty two year old nan. The Channel 4 version ran for three years, between 30 May 1997 and 24 April 2000, and spawned three series. The Channel 4 series was produced by Avalon Television.

To tie in with the series, Channel 4 released a book, Harry Hill's Fun Book, for Christmas 1998.

=== ITV1 (2003) ===
Following the success of Harry's latest television series, TV Burp, which was broadcast on ITV, ITV decided to recommission the series for themselves, purchasing the rights from Channel 4. For the revival, the show was retitled The All-New Harry Hill Show, and a series of six episodes were broadcast between 9 February and 16 March 2003.

New features for the revival included "The Hamilton Challenge", where each week Neil and Christine Hamilton would take on one of a number of different challenges, and "Celebrity hobby that you didn't know about.... but will in a minute", in which Harry would invite a celebrity on, who would then reveal their secret hobby, and the Bouncy Castle, whereby the show would end with the entire audience coming on stage, and bouncing on a giant bouncy castle. Although viewing figures were high enough, ITV decided not to commission another series.

=== Whatever Happened to Harry Hill? (2012) ===
In June 2012, as part of Channel 4's upcoming Funny Fortnight, Hill filmed a spoof documentary, entitled Whatever Happened to Harry Hill?. Featuring interviews with Alan Hill (Al Murray), Burt Kwouk and the Badgers, the "documentary" reveals the history of the show in a spoof light, with a fake storyline that Hill was the cause of the show's demise, becoming addicted to Sild and abusing cast members. Two new sketches featured Alan Hill performing as Rizzle Kicks and Hill, Alan, Burt Kwouk and Stouffer dressing up as the judges of The Voice UK, to perform a rendition of Jessie J's "Price Tag". The spoof documentary aired on 23 August 2012, alongside repeats of episodes from the first and third series of the show.

== Episodes ==
=== Series 1 (1997) ===
- Episode 1 (30 May 1997) – Guests: Keith Harris & Orville
- Episode 2 (6 June 1997) – Guests: Chas & Dave
- Episode 3 (13 June 1997) – Guests: Garry Bushell
- Episode 4 (27 June 1997) – Guests: Billy Bragg
- Episode 5 (4 July 1997) – Guests: Ian Lavender
- Episode 6 (11 July 1997) – Guests: Rustie Lee
- Episode 7 (18 July 1997) – Guests: Peter Davison
- Episode 8 (18 July 1997) – Guests: Todd Carty

=== Series 2 (1998) ===
- Episode 1 (30 October 1998) – Guests: Little and Large
- Episode 2 (6 November 1998) – Guests: Jan Leeming
- Episode 3 (13 November 1998) – Guests: Bill Pertwee
- Episode 4 (20 November 1998) – Guests: Mystic Meg
- Episode 5 (27 November 1998) – Guests: Huffty
- Episode 6 (11 December 1998) – Guests: Peter Baldwin
- Episode 7 (18 December 1998) – Guests: The Wurzels
- Episode 8 (18 December 1998) – Guests: Sweep
- Harry Hill's Christmas Sleigh Ride (23 December 1998) – Guests: Acker Bilk and Ted Rogers

=== Series 3 (2000) ===
- Harry Hill's Christmas Memory Lane of Laughter (23 December 1999) – Guests: Frank Skinner
- Episode 1 (27 February 2000) – Guests: Phill Jupitus
- Episode 2 (5 March 2000) – Guests: Russ Abbot
- Episode 3 (12 March 2000) – Guests: Ian Lavender
- Episode 4 (19 March 2000) – Guests: Bobby Davro
- Episode 5 (26 March 2000) – Guests: Barbara Dickson
- Episode 6 (9 April 2000) – Guests: Karl Howman
- Episode 7 (16 April 2000) – Guests: David Soul
- Episode 8 (24 April 2000) – Guests: Sarah Greene and Mike Smith

=== Series 4 (2003) ===
- Episode 1 (9 February 2003) – Guests: Nigel Havers
- Episode 2 (16 February 2003) – Guests: Gail Porter and Dan Hipgrave
- Episode 3 (23 February 2003) – Guests: Dora Bryan
- Episode 4 (2 March 2003) – Guests: Les Dennis
- Episode 5 (9 March 2003) – Guests: Rick Parfitt
- Episode 6 (16 March 2003) – Guests: Busted

=== Specials (2012) ===
- Whatever Happened to Harry Hill? (23 August 2012) – Guests: Paul Burling
