= Orbital Vehicle (disambiguation) =

An orbital vehicle is a spacecraft which attains orbit.

Orbit Vehicle, Orbital Vehicle, Orbiter Vehicle, or Orbiting Vehicle may also refer to:

- A vehicle capable of orbital spaceflight
- Space Shuttle, a NASA vehicle designated "Orbiter Vehicle"
  - Orbiter Vehicle Designation
- ISRO Orbital Vehicle (Gaganyaan), crewed orbital spacecraft
- Orbiting Vehicle (OV), the SATAR series of USAF experimental satellites

== See also ==
- Boeing X-37 (or Orbital Test Vehicle; OTV), a reusable robotic spacecraft
- Experimental Orbital Vehicle (XOV), a secret USAF black project spaceplane
- Orbital launch vehicle
- Orbital transfer vehicle (OTV) or space tug, a class of spacecraft used to transfer spaceborne cargo from one orbit to another
- Orbit (disambiguation)
- Orbital (disambiguation)
- Orbiter (disambiguation)
- OV (disambiguation)
- Vehicle (disambiguation)
