= Vehicle (disambiguation) =

A vehicle is a mechanical means of conveyance, such as a carriage or automobile. It may also refer to:

- Vahana, the Hindu term for a vehicle animal closely associated with a particular deity
- Star vehicle, a production primarily aimed at enhancing an actor's career
- Vehicle (The Ides of March album)
- "Vehicle" (song), the title track by The Ides of March
- Vehicle (Canadian band), a 1970s Canadian rock band
- Vehicle (The Clean album)
- Braitenberg vehicles, simple machines conceived by Valentino Braitenberg for a thought experiment in artificial intelligence
- Vehicle (paint), the substance in which the coloring pigment is suspended
- Vehicle (pharmaceutics), a carrier of a medicinally active substance
- In law, a legal personality such as a corporation, with similar legal rights to a living person

== See also ==
- Vessel (disambiguation)
