= Orbiter (disambiguation) =

An orbiter is a type of spacecraft.

Orbiter may also refer to:

- Space Shuttle orbiter, the main component of the Space Shuttle
- Orbiter (simulator), an open source space flight simulator
- Orbiter (1986 video game), an educational video game by Spectrum HoloByte
- Orbiter (comics), a graphic novel by Warren Ellis
- "Orbiter" (song), a 2026 song by Noah Kahan
- Echo Orbiter, an indie rock group
- Orbiter (ride), an amusement park ride
- Orbiter (Canada's Wonderland), an HUSS Skylab ride at Canada's Wonderland
- Orbiter 3, see Breitling Orbiter
- Winds Italia Orbiter, an Italian paramotor design
- Orbiter (internet slang)
- Aeronautics Defense Orbiter, an Israeli unmanned aerial vehicle

== See also ==
- Orbital vehicle (disambiguation)
- Orbital (disambiguation)
- Orbit (disambiguation)
