= In Orbit =

In Orbit may refer to:

- In Orbit (September album)
- In Orbit (Clark Terry album)
- In Orbit, an album by The Stomachmouths
- In Orbit, an album by Sun Araw
- In Orbit, 1967 novel by Wright Morris
- "In Orbit" (Come Back Mrs. Noah), a 1978 television episode

== See also ==
- Orbit (disambiguation)
