= Adventure Island (amusement park) =

Amusement park in England

- Previously known as Peter Pan's Playground, Peter Pan's Adventure Island

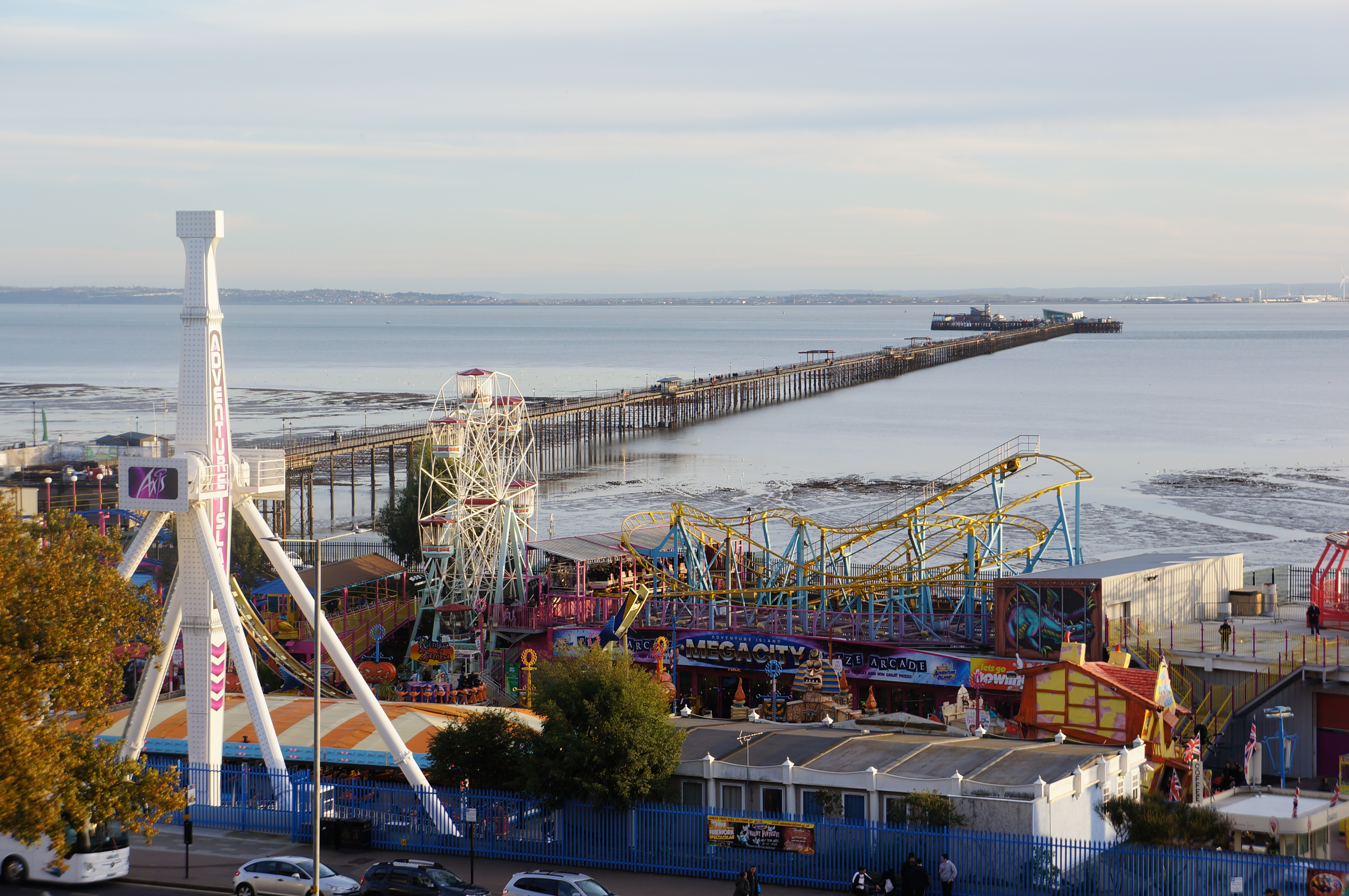
- Interactive map of Adventure Island
- Location: Southend-on-Sea, England
- Coordinates: 51°31′57″N 0°42′57″E
- Opened: 1976
- Owner: Stockvale Ltd
- Operating season: February – December; Year-round (Adventure Inside)

Attractions
- Total: 36
- Roller coasters: 5
- Water rides: 2
- Website: adventureisland.co.uk

Adventure Island is a themed amusement park in Southend-on-Sea, Essex, England. The site of the theme park flanks the north end of Southend Pier and has been a theme park since 1976 when the land now forming the west side of the park was purchased by the Miller family. The park used to be known as Peter Pan's Playground and later Peter Pan's Adventure Island before becoming Adventure Island. The site is owned and managed by Stockvale Limited. The park contains thirty six rides, retail outlets, and numerous catering outlets.

== History ==
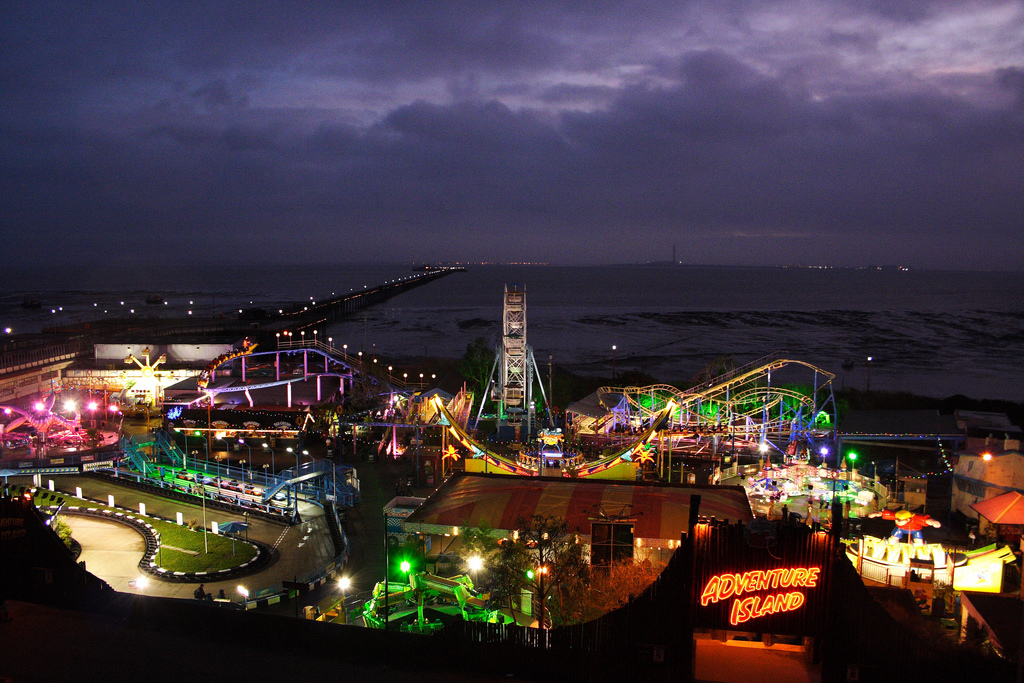
Adventure Island at night

Adventure Island started out in 1918 as Sunken Gardens, a sea-side garden that in the 1920s installed a few children's rides. It is known to have been originally owned and run by a Mr Maxwell, who also injected capital into and became one of the first co-directors of the EKCO Company in Southend. In 1976, the land to the west of the pier was purchased by the Miller family. They developed the amusement park on the site from the rudimentary original and the entire site was redeveloped extensively.

In 1995 the park was vastly expanded when the land to the east of the pier was purchased to form part of the park.

Complementing the park is Southend Pier, the longest pleasure pier in the world (built in 1830 as a wooden pier, rebuilt as a steel pier in 1889); it extends more than a mile (1,34 miles/2,16 km) toward the ocean. The pier train runs the entire length of the pier to the Lifeboat Museum. The park runs both east and west sides of the pier. The park's mascots are called Snappy, Rage Man, Jakey and Jan.

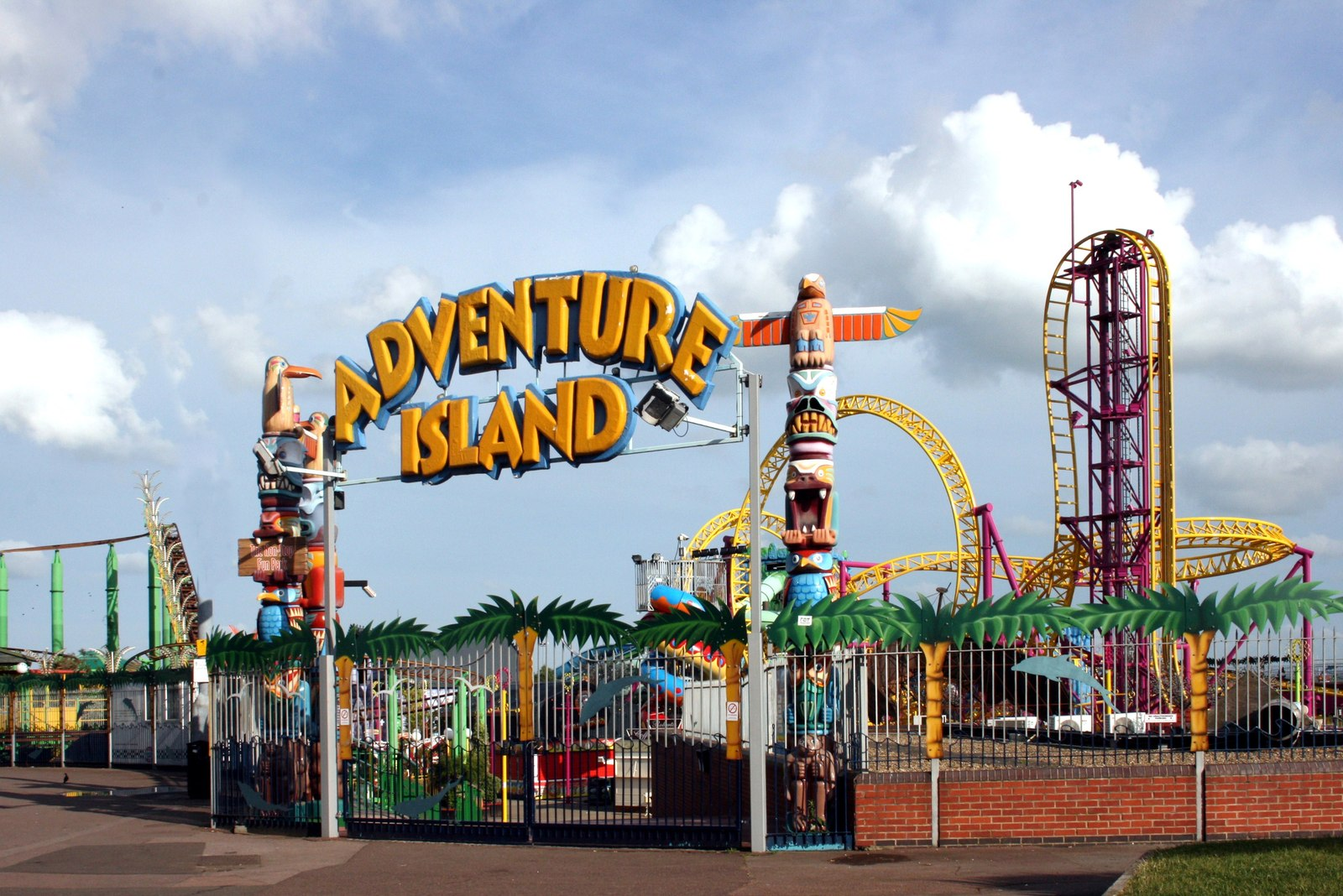
Adventure Island entrance gate

In 1999, the park debuted the roller coaster Green Scream. It was once described as the park's signature ride, but this title has now been taken by Rage. The second roller coaster at the park is the Barnstormer, which opened in 2000. The third roller coaster is named the Mighty Mini Mega, which opened in 2002. Kiddi Koasta, a children's roller coaster, opened to the public on 30 April 2011.

The fifth roller coaster, Rage, opened in February 2007. It is one of the biggest investments the park has ever made. The ride cost in the region of £3 million and is located on the former Raging River Log Flume site. The Sky Drop and Vortex rides were relocated to new positions in the park to make way. The ride is about 75 feet (23 m) in height and has a 97 degree drop, a vertical lift hill, a vertical loop, a zero-g roll and tight turns. It was named Rage after a competition in the newspaper Southend Echo to decide a name for the ride. The slogan is "For Superheroes only!"

In 2014 Adventure Island demolished the Pirate Boat, which was one of their oldest attractions, to make way for Adventure Inside in spring 2015.

In September 2016 the park retained a top five status in the "Friendliest Park in the World" category at the annual Amusement Today Golden Ticket Awards.

In September 2020, Adventure Island temporarily closed, following advice from Essex Police after a traveller encampment was set up in the nearby Kursaal car park. In an update on the company's Facebook page, Adventure Island told visitors that they had been "advised to close early due to traveller invasion!" and that it was "best to be safe than sorry!". The language used in the post was criticised by Traveller Rights organisations as reinforcing negative stereotypes about Traveller communities. The post was later deleted, and the company apologised for any offence caused.

In 2021, the park hosted the first Pride event to celebrate the LGBTQ+ community, that hosted local drag queens performing. They also hosted their first annual Islandfest that celebrates local talented artists and musicians by showcasing their talents. Their yearly events include Fairytale weekend, Superhero weekend, a Halloween themed week during October half term, Christmas Wonderland, and Islandfest.

On 17 July 2023, Adventure Island decided not to host future Pride events after a controversial performance by drag queen Crystal. The drag queen expressed disappointment, accusing corporations of exploiting Pride for profit. Crystal defended the act, involving an angle grinder, stating it was similar to performances on shows like Britain's Got Talent or by pop stars like Lady Gaga. However, theme park owner Philip Miller cited confusion over acceptable content and emphasized the park's family-friendly focus. Miller apologized for any offense caused and announced the park's decision not to participate in future Pride celebrations.

In 2024 and 2025, the park was named the "Best value theme park" in the United Kingdom by VIP Grinders.

== Controversy ==
Adventure Island has been involved in various controversies, in particular between 2023-2025. In 2023, rides were subject to stoppages and emergency incidents. For example, the Rage rollercoaster broke down leaving passengers hanging at near 90-degree angles on the 72-foot high rollercoaster for 40 minutes. A similar incident took place earlier in the year in July, with passengers stating the ride "shook violently" before the ride ground to a halt leaving passengers suspended midair and requiring rescue from trained professionals.

Adventure Island has been the subject of controversy owing to actions and statements of Philip Miller (CEO and director), in particular for his post on X (formerly Twitter) following the England Lioness' World Cup semi-final win against Australia. Alongside an image of a pile of dirty dishes, Philip posted "The tragic unseen side effects of the women's world cup". In response to widespread condemnation of the post as sexist, Philip then sought to defend his comment by referring to it as "tongue-in-cheek", further doubling down by stating that "I do have the feeling the worlds going mad and being taken over by the noisy minority".

Miller has also been criticised for his self-interest in criticising the £50m Seaway leisure development, which was expected to create around 500 jobs. Miller stated "It's not the development we are against...The reason we are so adamantly against is it will lead to the extinction of our business". Council leaders criticised the remarks, adding that Miller failed to provide any substance to why he believed Seaway to have led to the collapse of the business.

== Features ==
Adventure Island is not divided into specific areas but divides its rides into height restrictions: no height limit, must be over 1 metre, must be over 1.2 metres, must be over 1.3 metres. Before 2021, the park sold colour coded wristbands depending on height. Red bands would be for under 1m tall, green for under 1.2m tall, and blue for over 1.2 metres tall. The park is separated into the East side of the pier, and the West side of the pier. There is also an inside area in the middle called Adventure Inside with a 5-storey softplay centre, 4 rides Funtopia arcade and a café.

== Rides and attractions ==
=== Rollercoasters ===
Name	Picture	Type	Year	Operational Status	Manufacturer	Minimum Height	Additional information
Barnstormer		Tivoli	2000	Operating	Zierer	1 Meter +	Reaches a speed of 39 km/h (24 mph) on a 222 m (728 ft) and a height of 9 m (30 ft); height requirement 1 m (3 ft 3 in). Small Tivoli model. It looks quite tame although it has what has been called one of the best helix curves on a mini coaster. The train is half the length of that of the Green Scream and has a fibreglass pilot at the front, a dog at the back, with propellers mounted at each end.
Green Scream		Tivoli	1999	Operating	Zierer	1 Meter +	A family rollercoaster; height requirement 1 m (3 ft 3 in). No inversions and the drops are tame. The Green Scream's train is green with a red interior, apart from the first car which is red and has a fibreglass crocodile to represent Snappy, a park mascot. The back of the rear car has the tail of the crocodile. The train is quite long, comprising 20 cars seating two people each.
Kiddi Koasta		Speedy Coaster	2011	Operating	Zamperla	No minimum height	A children's rollercoaster; no minimum height. A speedy coaster which opened to the public on 30 April 2011. This rollercoaster is aimed at young children and people who are not used to larger and faster rollercoasters, due to its gentle drops, twist and turns.. It now operates on top of a building located in the park.
Mighty Mini Mega		Mini Mega Coaster MM29	2003	Operating	Pinfari	1 Meter +	Located on top of the Mega City arcade for added effect but was originally built on ground level with the arcade being built after and then the ride was placed on top; height requirement 1 m (3 ft 3 in). MM29 model. Has six cars each with two rows of two, seating 24 riders in total. The ride itself is short, however it is quite intense in some places with a helix towards the end and quite a sharp brake run.
Rage		Euro-Fighter	2007	Operating	Gerstlauer	1.2 Meter +	Reaches a speed of 70 km/h (43 mph) on an 361 m (1,184 ft) long track and a height of 22 m (72 ft) with 3 inversions (vertical loop, cutback, heartline roll) and a 97° drop; height requirement 1.2 m (3 ft 11 in). Eurofighter 320+ model.

=== Thrill rides ===
Name	Picture	Model	Manufacturer	Year	Operational Status	Additional information
Archelon	Archelon swing	Wave Swinger	Zierer	1997	Operating	Height requirement 1.2 m.
Axis		Maxi Dance Party 360	SBF Visa	2019	Operating	Height requirement 1.3 m. Age requirement 10. It is in the original space of Dragon's Claw.
Devil's Dance		Spin-Out	Tivoli	2024	Operating	Height requirement 1.2 m. Opened as Dragons Claw in 2001, Refurbished to Devil's Dance in 2024
The Screature		Orbitor	Tivoli	2021	Operating	Height requirement 1.3 m. Now sits in the space of Scorpion/Claw.
Pharaoh's Fury		Twister	Sonacase	1998	Operating	An Egyptian themed twister ride located next to Axis; height limit 1.2m.
Ramba Zamba		Disk-O	Zamperla	2004	Operating	Height requirement 1.2 m.
Sky Drop		Drop Tower	Zamperla	2004	Operating	A 70 ft (21m) tall drop tower that is located near the exit of Rage and faces towards the park; height requirement 1.2 m.
Tidal Wave Blue		Water dinghy ride	Interlink	1995	Operating	A dinghy slide located near Vortex, the ride shares a building, and partly a queue, with Tidal Wave Green; height requirement 1.2 m.
Tidal Wave Green		Water dinghy ride	Interlink	1995	Operating	A dinghy slide that is located adjacent to Blue Tidal Wave. Minimum height requirement 1.2 m.
Time Machine		Giant Swing	Adventure Island Workshop	2012	Operating	A thrill ride built internally at the park, that is located in the original space of Vortex; height requirement 1.2 m.
Vertigo		Drop Tower	SBF Visa	2024	Operating	A 38m drop tower thrill ride, that is located on the West side of the park, next to the Crooked House; height requirement 1.2 m.

=== Family rides ===
Name	Picture	Model	Manufacturer	Year	Operational Status	Additional information
Cow Jump		Mini Miami Ride	Adventure Island Workshop	2003	Operating	A mini Miami ride themed to "Hey Diddle Diddle"; height requirement 1 m.
Drop n' Smile		Mini Drop Tower	Adventure Island Workshop	2001	Operating	A small drop ride located next to the American Whip; height requirement 1 m.
Fireball		Ferris wheel-type spinner ride	Adventure Island Workshop	2006	Operating	A ride built internally at the park and is located opposite The Screature; height requirement 1 m+.
Sk8borda	Sk8borda	Rocking tug	Zamperla/Adventure Island Workshop	2004	Operating	A rocking tug themed to a skateboarder. The ride sees all riders face the same way, unlike most Zamperla versions of the same model; height requirement 1 m+. Zamperla/Adventure Island Workshop.
Smiles-Per-Galleon		Pirate Ship	SBF Visa	2015	Operating	A pirate ship located in Adventure Inside. Minimum height requirement 1 m.
Sea Dragon		Roundabout Ride	Zierer	1995	Operating	A roundabout ride that goes both forwards and backwards; height requirement 1 m+.
The Pirate Plunge		Drop Tower	SBF Visa	2015	Operating	A drop tower located in Adventure Inside. Minimum height requirement 1 m.

=== Kids' rides ===
Name	Picture	Model	Manufacturer	Year	Operational Status	Additional information
Adventureville		Dark ride	Adventure Island Workshop	2016	Operating	An indoor mini adventure ride, opened in 2016 and replaced Devil's Creek.
American Whip		Whip	Adventure Island Workshop	2009	Operating	A children's version of the classic whip ride.
Big Wheel		Ferris Wheel	Adventure Island Workshop	1983	Operating	A classic Ferris Wheel attraction located between Barnstormer and Mighty Mini Mega.
Carousel		Carousel	SBF Visa	2015	Operating	A typical carousel ride located upstairs in the Adventure Inside section.
City Wheel		Big Wheel	Guven Luna Park	2022	Operating	A large city wheel overlooking the Thames.
Crooked House		Fun house	Adventure Island Workshop	Before 1953	Operating	A crooked house attraction. The exact year that this attraction was installed is not known but it was certainly built a number of years before the great flood that devastated the east coast in 1953. Was rethemed in 2018. Adventure Island Workshop.
Dune Buggies		Bounce n Spin	SBF Visa	2015	Operating	A children's ride located in Adventure Inside.
Flying Jumbos		Flying Elephants Ride	Modern Products	1999	Operating	A flying elephants ride.
Jumpin' Jolly Rogers		Roundabout Ride	Adventure Island Workshop	2004	Operating	A mini version of a ski jump ride but designed for small children.
Viking Boats		Boat Roundabout	Zierer	1996	Operating	A boat roundabout located next to Green Scream.
Over The Hill 2:Spooksville		Spooky Train	Adventure Island Workshop	2017	Operating	A spooky train ride for younger children.

=== Other attractions ===
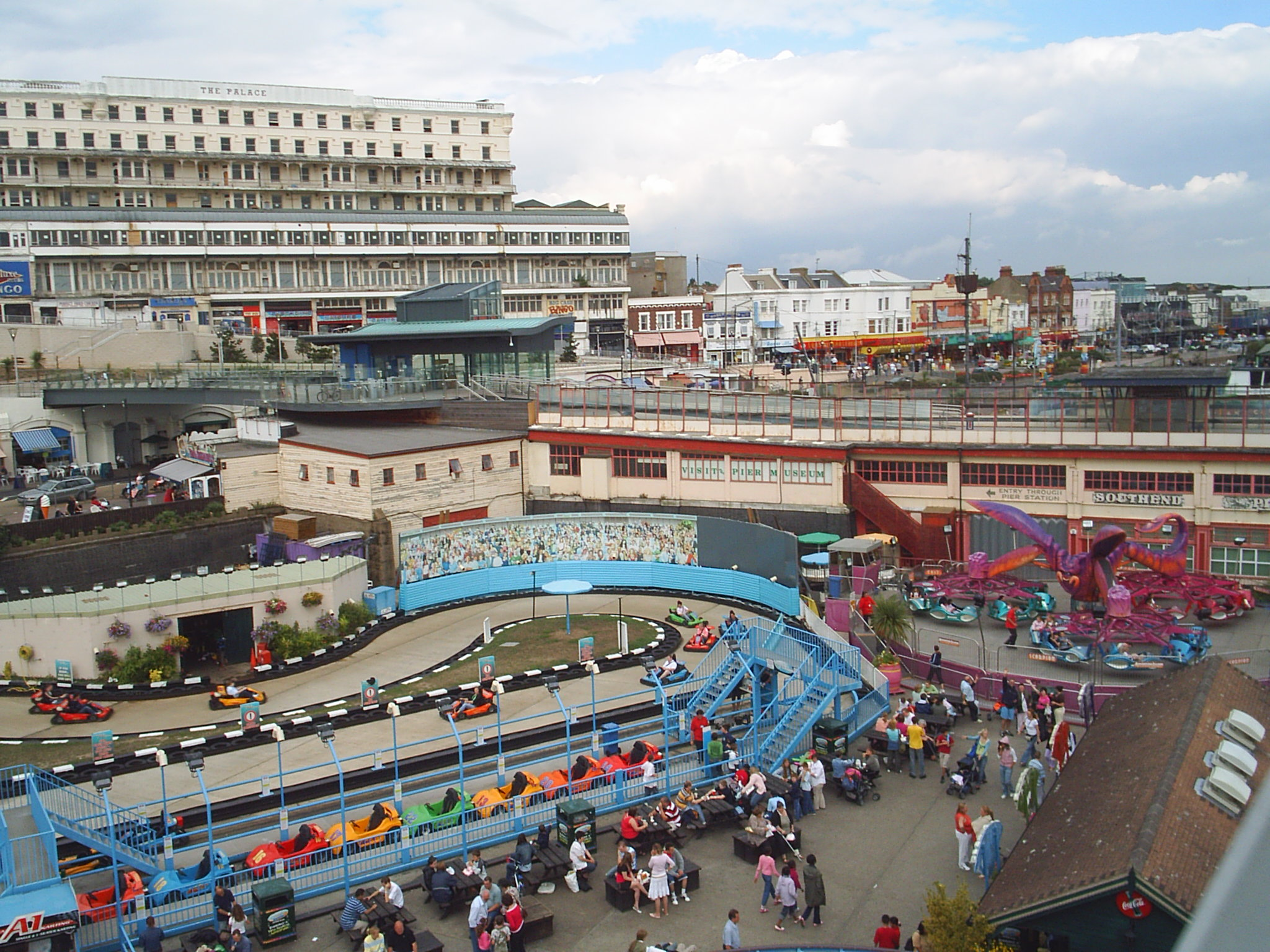
Formula 1A Karting

- Adventure Golf – two different courses available; extra charge.
- Sealife Adventure – not in Adventure Island but in an adjacent area.
- Funtopia Arcade – amusement arcades open when Adventure Inside is open.
- MegaCity Arcade – amusement arcades open when the park is open.

=== Past rides ===
A list of the past rides include:

- Devils Creek Gold Mine – was a Red Wristband children's track ride, which had a train of spinning barrel cars taken along by a train-like front carriage. The ride featured a rock tunnel and an outdoor section with much devil-theming scattered around the ride. The ride was originally known as the Jigsaw Train but over time received many theming updates until its eventual removal at the end of 2015 to be replaced by Adventureville in 2016. It is also referenced in Adventureville.
- American Freeway – a spinning ride similar to a Matterhorn ride but without the swinging cars. The ride type is almost the same as the Dragon that is now at the park, however this ride had large seats featuring high railings attached to the top of each seat for safety.
- Barracuda – an inverter ship style attraction with a white and brown colour scheme. It was located near the area of where Axis is now.
- Beezlee Bob's Trail – Currently Over The Hill 2: Spooksville – Was a Dark Ride built in 1999 and closed down in 2007 to make way for Over The Hill. The ride featured many whacky characters and had a spooky feel to it
- Blackbeards: All at Sea – was a cinema attraction located on the current site of the Adventure Inside section.
- Blackbeards Pirate Adventure
- Fantasy Dome – a large dome attraction.
- Golden Hind
- Helter Skelter - An iconic red and white slide that stood for nearly forty years at the western end of the park. Closed in 2024.
- Mr Smee's Boat Ride
- Pirate Galleon – a typical pirate ship ride
- Raging River – Raging River was an Interlink IG flume ride that opened in 1996 and closed in 2006. The ride featured 2 drops and had a track length of 270 and was replaced by Rage the following year.
- Sea Serpent
- Sky Lab – a thrilling flat ride that is similar to an Enterprise ride but the cars where similar to that of a Matterhorn ride.
- Space Chase – a shuttle rollercoaster identical to Roller Coaster owned by Beeches Fun Fair on the UK travelling circuit. The ride had light blue track and white supports.
- Over The Hill – Over The Hill was the replacement ride for Beelzee Bob's Trail. Over The Hill was designed InHouse and many Audio-Visuals were produced by Sarner. The ride shut down in 2017 and was rethemed into Over The Hill 2: Spooksville.
- Scorpion – a Tivoli Scorpion that opened in 2001; height limit 1.2 m and was a Blue Band ride. The ride closed near the end of 2018 to make way for Axis. Its site is now occupied by Dragon's Claw, which was moved from elsewhere in the park. The Scorpion ride has also featured at Gillwell 24 2019 after being removed, suggesting it is still in operation
- Vortex – An orbiter that opened in 2001; height limit 1.2 m and was a Blue Band ride. The ride closed in 2022 and was sold.
- Jungle Express – mini train ride; height limit 1 m. Falgas
- Formula 1A Karting – go karts, extra charge.
- Dodgems – bumper cars; extra charge, Closed in October 2022
- Magic Monsters – Small roundabout ride, opened in 1999 closed October 2022

== In popular culture ==
The 2011 The Amazing World of Gumball episode The Dress features a rollercoaster named the Stomach Destroyer which is directly modeled after Adventure Island's Rage.

The third episode of the 2026 British sitcom Ann Droid was partially filmed at Adventure Island and features a scene in which Sue and her android assistant Linda ride on Rage.

== Gallery ==
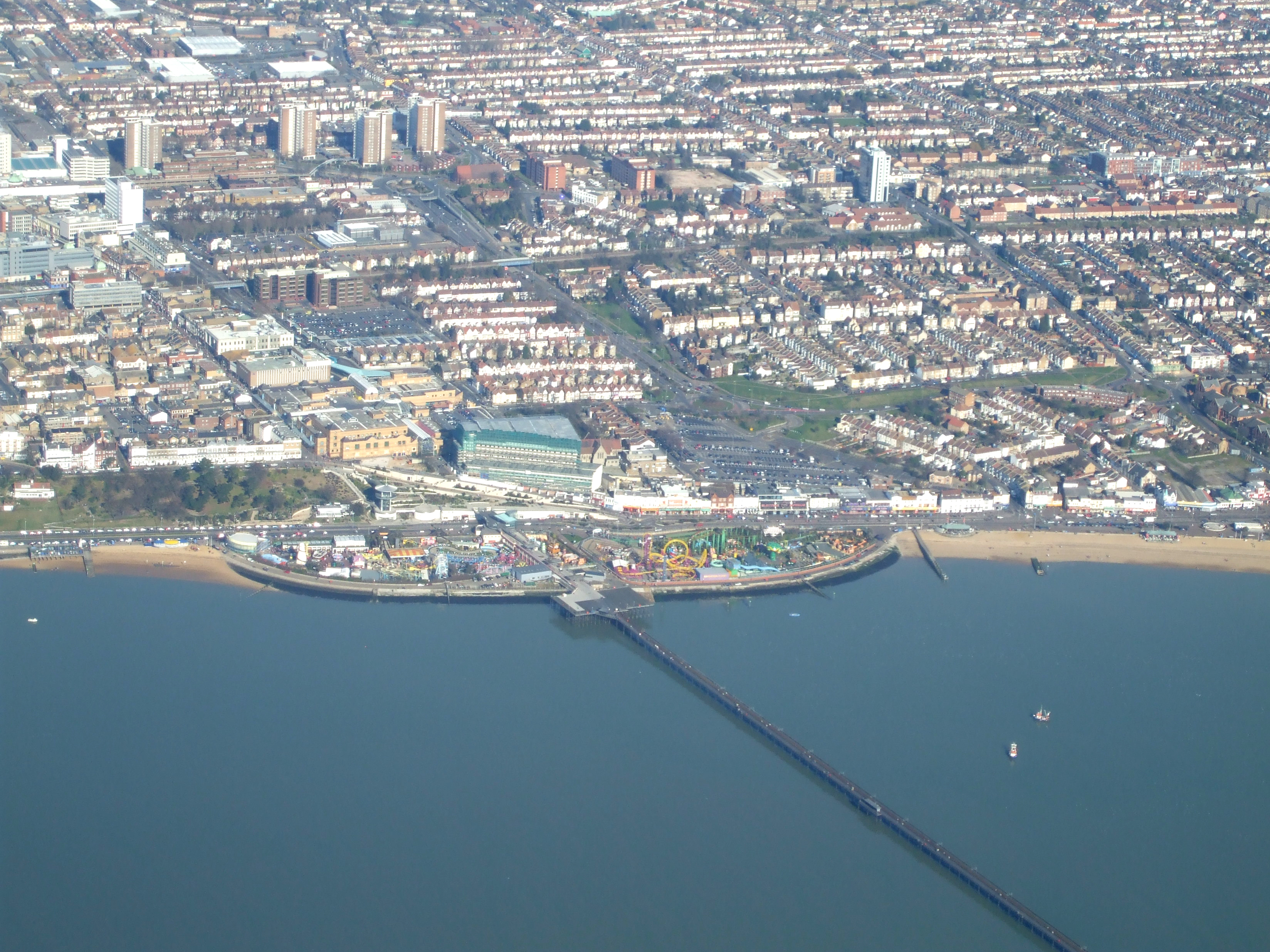
Aerial photo of Adventure Island

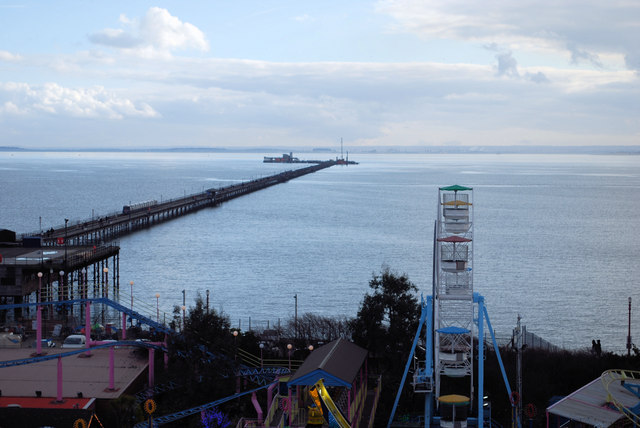
The pier

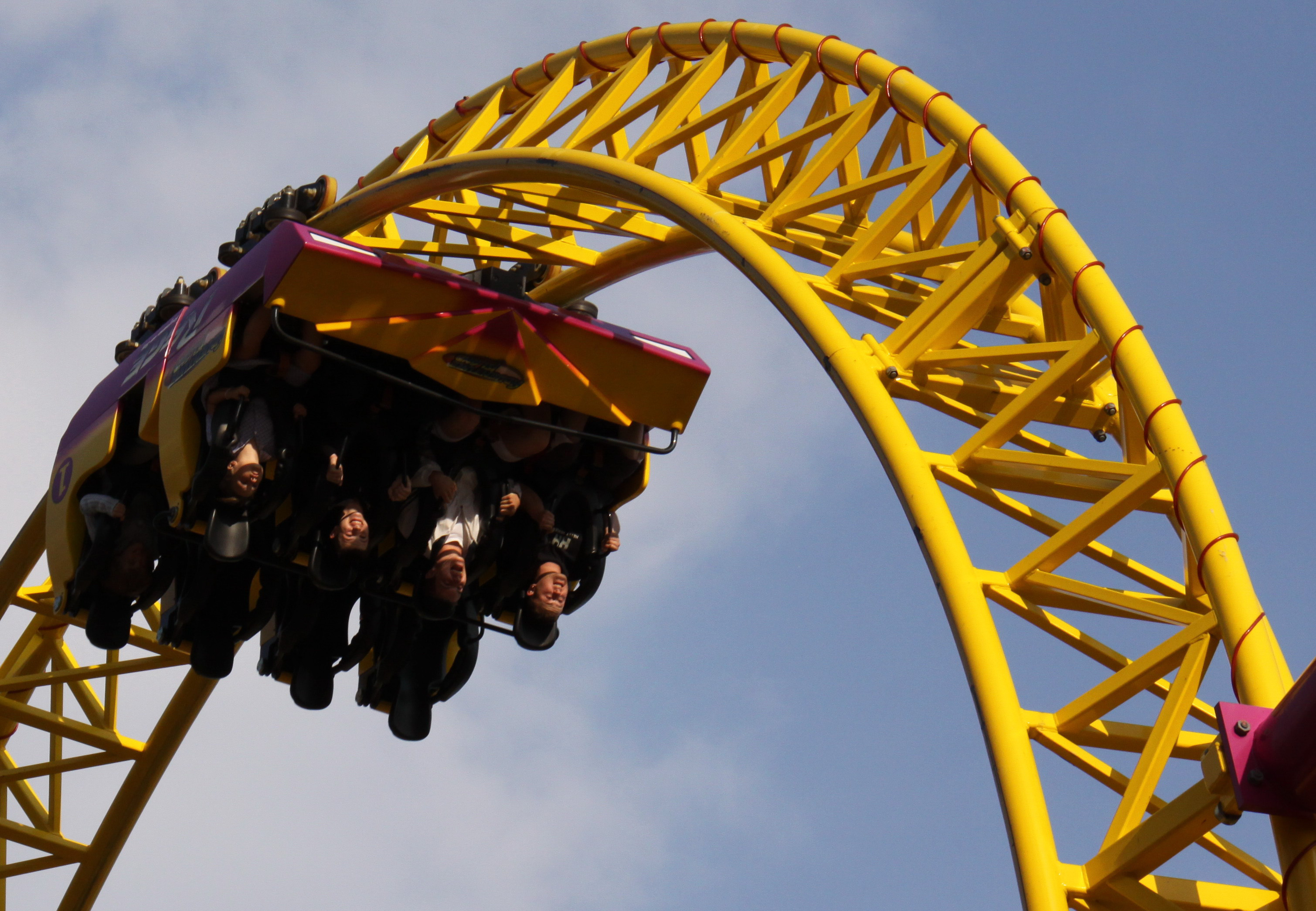
Rage

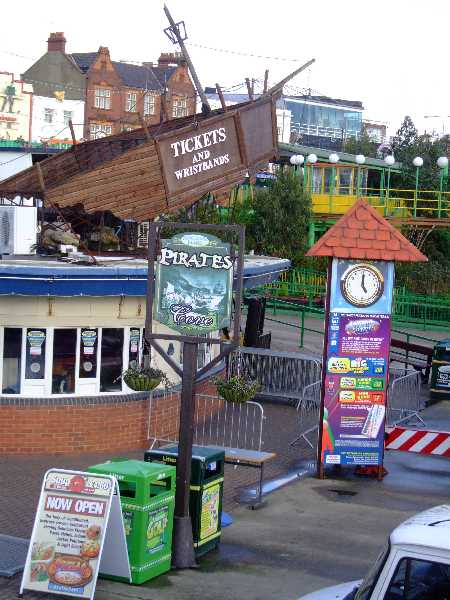
Pirate's Cove

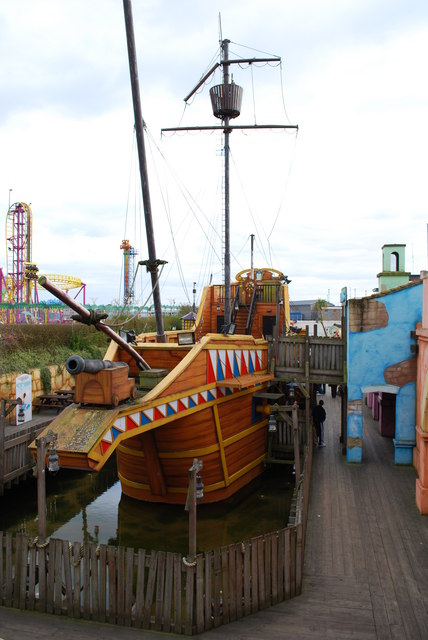
Pirate ship

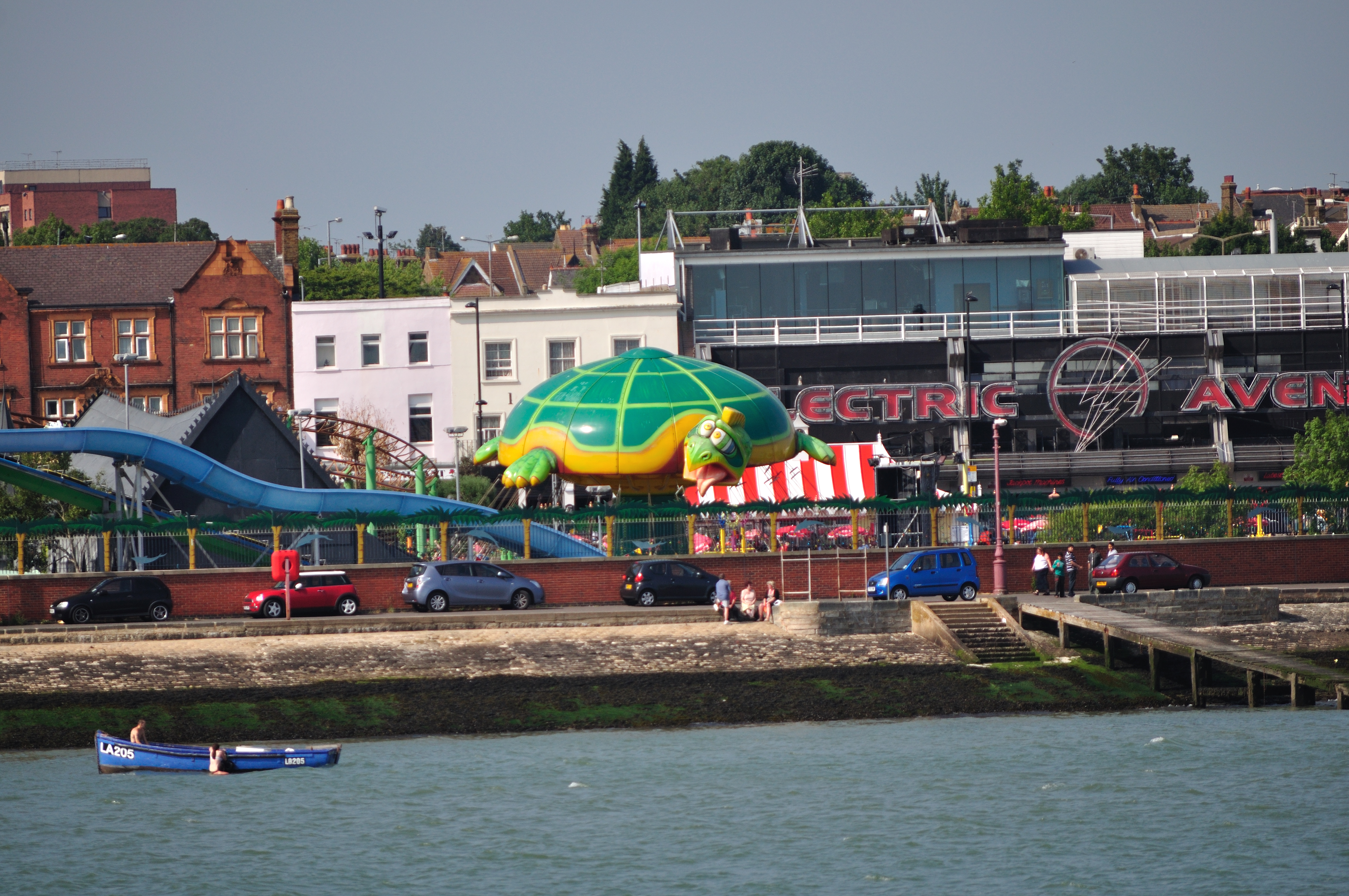
View from water
