= Orbitz (disambiguation) =

Orbitz.com is a travel fare aggregator website owned by Orbitz Worldwide, Inc.

Orbitz may also refer to:

- Orbitz (drink) a short-lived 1990s soft drink
- Orbitz 300, the 2007 stock car race

== See also ==
- Orbit (disambiguation)
