= Paratrooper (ride) =

Type of fairground ride

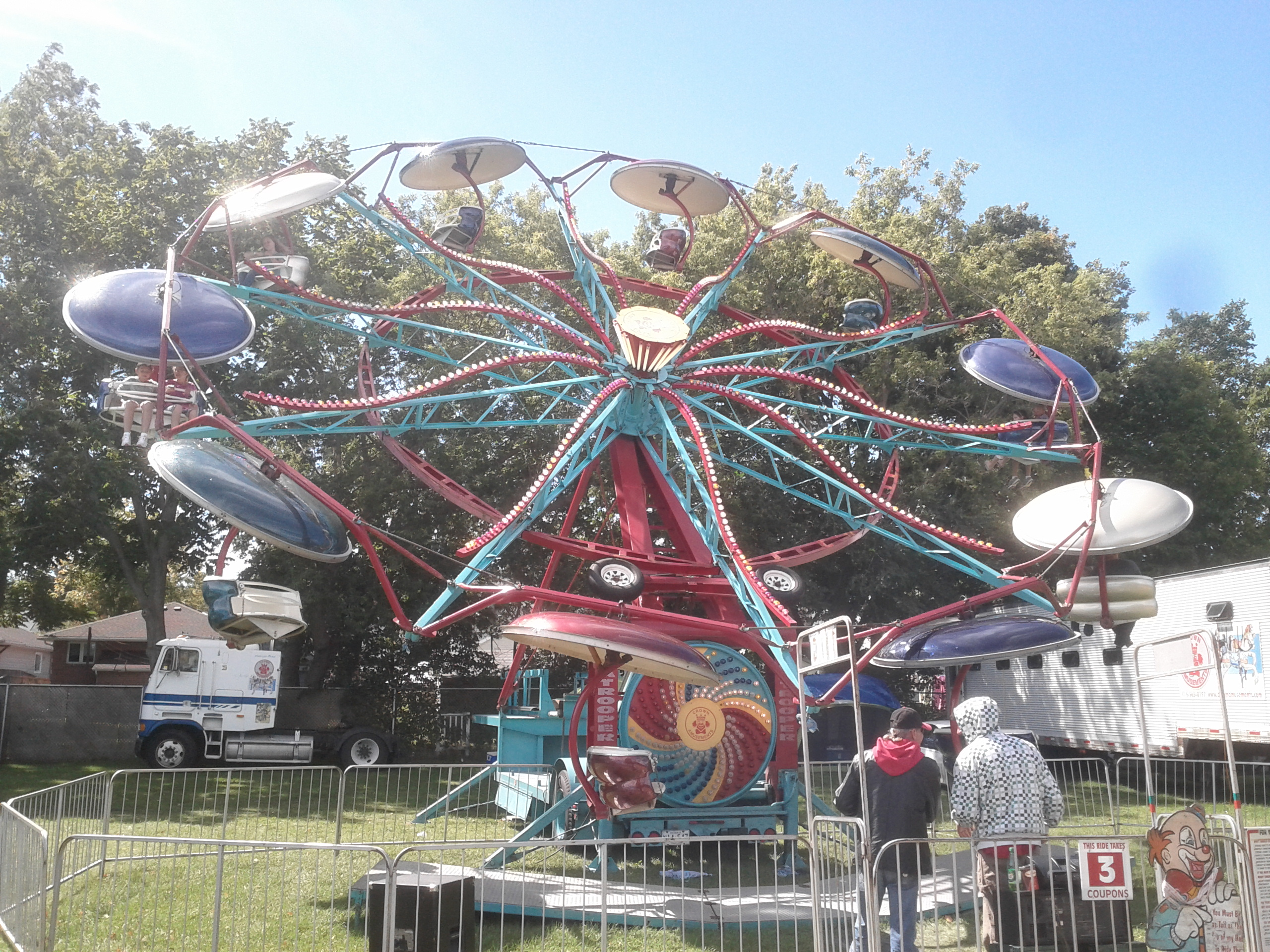
An example of the Paratrooper ride as set up at the Picton, Ontario, Canada fair in 2013

The Paratrooper, also known as the "Parachute Ride" or "Umbrella Ride", is a type of fairground ride. It is a ride where seats suspended below a wheel rotate at an angle. The seats are free to rock sideways and swing out under centrifugal force as the wheel rotates. Invariably, the seats on the Paratrooper ride have a round shaped umbrella or other shaped canopy above the seats. In contrast to modern thrill rides, the Paratrooper is a ride suitable for almost all ages. Most Paratrooper rides require the rider to be at least 36 inches (91.44 cm) tall to be accompanied by an adult, and over 48 inches (121.92 cm) to ride alone.

Older Paratrooper rides have a rotating wheel which is permanently raised, which has the disadvantage that riders can only load two at a time as each seat is brought to hang vertically at the lowest point of the wheel. Some models have a lower platform that's slightly raised on the ends that could permit the loading of up to three seats at a time. Most of these rides were made by the manufacturing companies Bennett, Watkins or Hrubetz. The German manufacturer Heintz-Fahtze also made larger models of the Paratrooper under the name of the Twister.

Modern Paratrooper rides use a hydraulic lifting piston to raise the wheel to their riding angle while spinning the seats. In its lowered position, all the seats hang vertically near the ground and can be loaded simultaneously. The above manufacturers also made these types and the height requirements to ride them remain the same.

== Variations ==
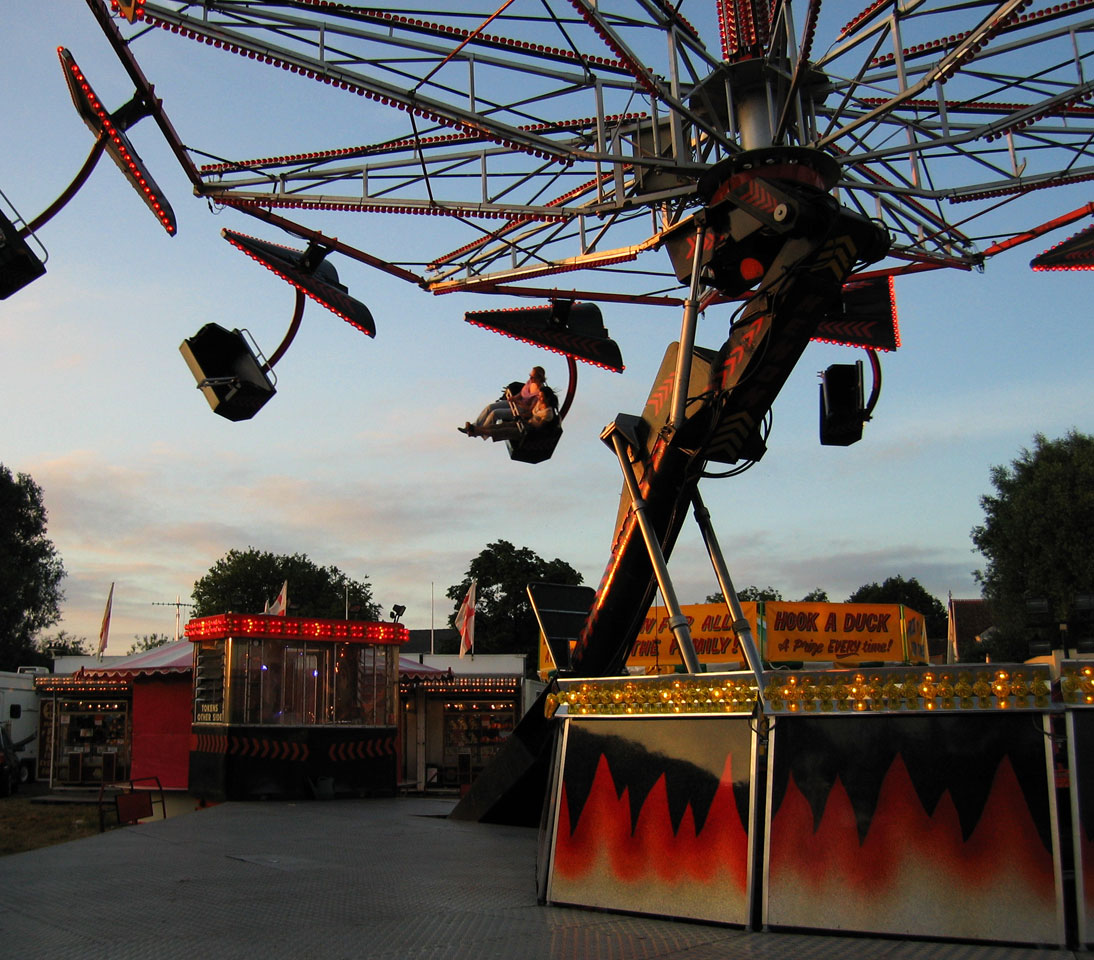
A Paratrooper ride at dusk

The Force 10 is a ride made by Tivoli Enterprises that features some of the same motion of the Paratrooper. The Star Trooper is a variant created by Dartron Industries that features seats facing both ways. The Star Trooper's initial design eventually evolved into the Cliffhanger, also made by Dartron Industries.

The same seats for this ride are used in the Swift-O-Plane and the same height requirement is the same as Enterprise.

In the 1980s, British amusement manufacturer David Ward developed the Super Trooper, of which the wheel rises horizontally up a central column. Once at the top, the wheel slants up to 45 degrees in either direction. He built two 12-seat versions and a 10-seat version. In 2018, PWS Rides Ltd. acquired the plans from Ward to build a new version with the first example due to be delivered in early 2019.
