= The Ides of March (band) =

American rock band

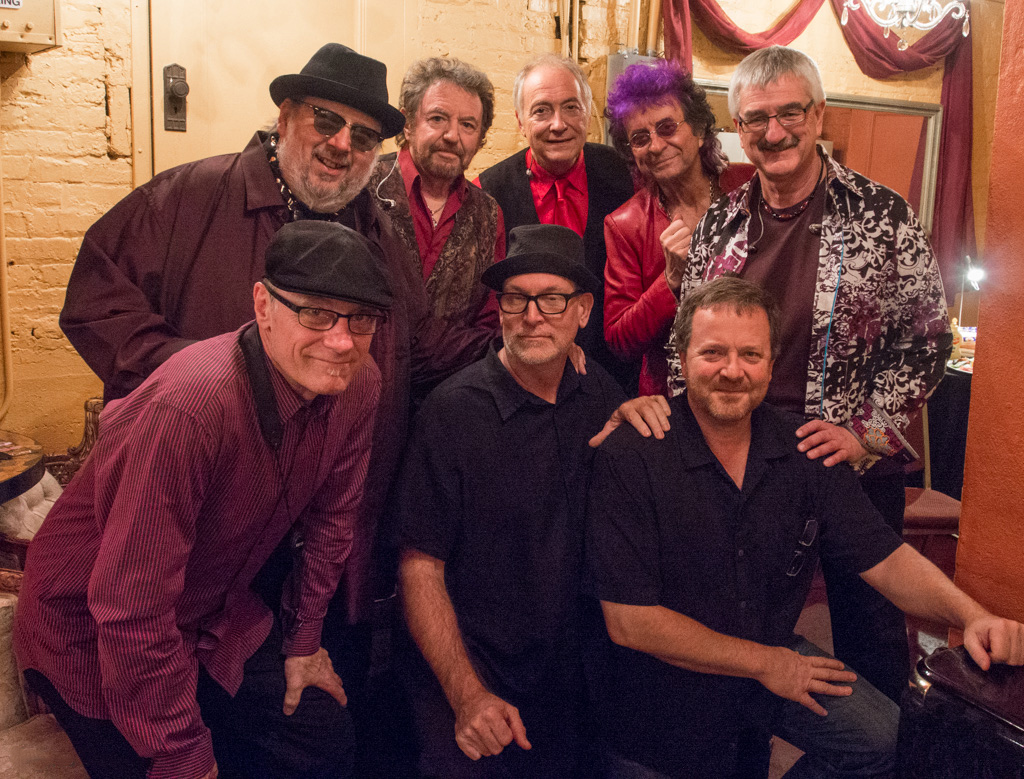
- The Ides of March in 2015

Background information
- Origin: Berwyn, Illinois, U.S.
- Genres: Rock; jazz fusion
- Years active: 1966–1973; 1990–present
- Labels: Parrot; Warner Bros.; RCA
- Members: Larry Millas; Jim Peterik; Bob Bergland; Mike Borch; Scott May; Tim Bales; Steve Eisen; Henry Salgado
- Past members: John Larson; Ray Herr; Conrad Prybe; Dave Arellano; Dave Southern; Chuck Soumar; Dave Stahlberg

The Ides of March is an American jazz rock band that had a major North American and minor UK hit with the song "Vehicle" in 1970. After going on hiatus in 1973, the band returned with their original line-up in 1990 and has been active since then. Sometimes they are considered a one-hit wonder despite having 5 songs in the US Top 100 and 4 in Canada.

== Career ==
=== Early days ===
The Ides of March began in Berwyn, Illinois (a near western suburb of Chicago), on October 16, 1964, as a four-piece band called "The Shon-Dels". Their first record, "Like It or Lump It", was released on their own "Epitome" record label in 1965.

In 1966, after changing their name to The Ides of March (a name suggested by bassist Bob Bergland after reading Shakespeare's Julius Caesar in high school), the band released their first single on Parrot Records, "You Wouldn't Listen". The song reached No. 7 on WLS Chicago on June 17, 1966, No. 42 on the Hot 100 on July 23–30, 1966, and No. 21 in Canada. This record and its follow-ups (all pre-"Vehicle") have been re-released on the Sundazed Records CD Ideology.

In early 1967, trumpeter Steve Daniels was added. He was succeeded in late 1969 by two horn players, John Larson and Chuck Soumar, with Bergland often doubled up on tenor saxophone.

Parrot singles:

- "You Wouldn't Listen" / "I'll Keep Searching" (Parrot 304) 1966 (reached No. 7 in Chicago)
- "Roller Coaster" / "Things Aren't Always What They Seem" (Parrot 310) 1966 (reached No. 14 in Chicago)
- "You Need Love" / "Sha-La-La-Lee" (Parrot 312) 1966
- "My Foolish Pride" / "Give Your Mind Wings" (Parrot 321) 1967
- "Hole in My Soul" / "Girls Don't Grow on Trees" (Parrot 326) 1967**

(** these are the only two tracks they recorded in stereo during the Parrot years)

Kapp single:

- "Nobody Loves Me" / "Strawberry Sunday" (Kapp 992) 1968

Ray Herr, a folk singer who had been gigging with another local outfit, the Legends of Time, joined the Ides as alternate lead singer (alongside Peterik) and rhythm guitarist. This allowed Peterik to concentrate on lead guitar. Herr first appeared on "Girls Don't Grow on Trees" in 1967.

Like Columbia's The Cryan' Shames, they had local success in the Chicago area without much label support. Unlike the Cryan' Shames, who issued three albums on Columbia, Parrot never scheduled an album for the Ides of March.

=== Success ===
Having secured a recording contract with Warner Bros. Records in 1970 the band released the track "Vehicle", which allegedly became the fastest-selling single in Warner's history. Fourteen seconds of the completed "Vehicle" master tape (primarily the guitar solo) were accidentally erased in the recording studio. The missing section was spliced in from a previously discarded take.

The song reached No. 2 on the Billboard Hot 100, No. 6 on the corresponding Cash Box listings, and No. 3 in Canada. It sold over one million copies, and was awarded a gold disc in November 1972. The following album, Vehicle, reached No. 55 nationally.

The band toured extensively throughout 1970 in support of many top acts, including Jimi Hendrix, Janis Joplin and Led Zeppelin. The Ides of March were also among the participants in the "Festival Express" train tour documented in a 2003 film, although they were not featured in the film.

During the summer of 1970, Ray Herr was forced to leave the Ides to investigate his status with the local draft board. He changed his name to Ray Scott and formed the short-lived group Orphanage before relocating to Nashville to pursue a career in country music.

In 1971, the band released their second album Common Bond. The featured single was "L.A. Goodbye". The song was at No. 1 on regional charts for five weeks, No. 2 on WCFL Chicago, No. 5 on WLS Chicago, No. 63 in Canada, but only No. 73 on the Billboard Hot 100.

In 1972, the band moved to RCA Records and released World Woven. At this point, the band departed from the "brass" sound (though one song featured a single trumpet) and the album produced no hit singles.

In 1973, the Midnight Oil album was released. The band played its final show of their "first era" at Morton West High School in Berwyn that November.

=== Split ===
Between 1973 and 1990, The Ides of March went on an extended hiatus, during which Jim Peterik co-founded the band Survivor and co-wrote all of their platinum hits including "Eye of the Tiger", "The Search Is Over", "High on You" and "I Can't Hold Back".

He also began a career of writing collaborations which resulted in many platinum hits for other artists, most notably "Hold on Loosely", "Rockin' into the Night", "Caught Up in You", "Fantasy Girl" and "Wild-Eyed Southern Boys" for .38 Special and "Heavy Metal" for Sammy Hagar.

=== The Ides and Shames Union ===
In 1974, Larry Millas and Chuck Soumar wanted to get back to touring. With the help of Columbia Records Promo men Dave Remidi and John Galobich, former lead singer for "The Cryan Shames" Tom Doody (Toad) was contacted. With the addition of Don Melton on piano and John Pavletic on lead guitar, this new aggregation was called "The Ides and Shames Union". They toured under this name for approximately a year, and then expanded the group with former Shames member Jim Pilster (J.C. Hooke). In quick order, Chuck Soumar took his leave, and Ted Kalamatas replaced him on drums. Ted was soon replaced by former Shames drummer Ronnie Kaplan. Then lead player John Pavletic stepped down, and was replaced by former Shames lead guitarist Jim Fairs. With the addition of Randy Poiniatowski on Hammond organ, the group then changed its name back to "The Cryan Shames". They continued touring the US midwest until late 1977 and then disbanded.

=== Comeback ===
In 1990, The Ides' home town of Berwyn offered to have the re-united group headline their "Summerfaire". The concert was attended by over 20,000 and the Ides returned to live performances. The following year they released their first new music since 1973, a four-song cassette EP entitled "Beware – The Ides of March". Trumpeter and backing vocalist Chuck Soumar is credited with being primarily responsible for reuniting the band.

In 1992, the album Ideology was released with re-recordings of "Vehicle", and "You Wouldn't Listen", plus new material.

In 1997, the five-track album "Age Before Beauty" was released, which included an instrumental of "Vehicle" and a new version of "Roller Coaster". And by 1998 the band wrote and released "Finally Next Year" to commemorate the Chicago Cubs' season. The song was included on a CD entitled The Cubs' Greatest Hits which was sold at all Major League ballparks. The song was used on many Cubs-themed radio and television programs.

=== Recent times ===
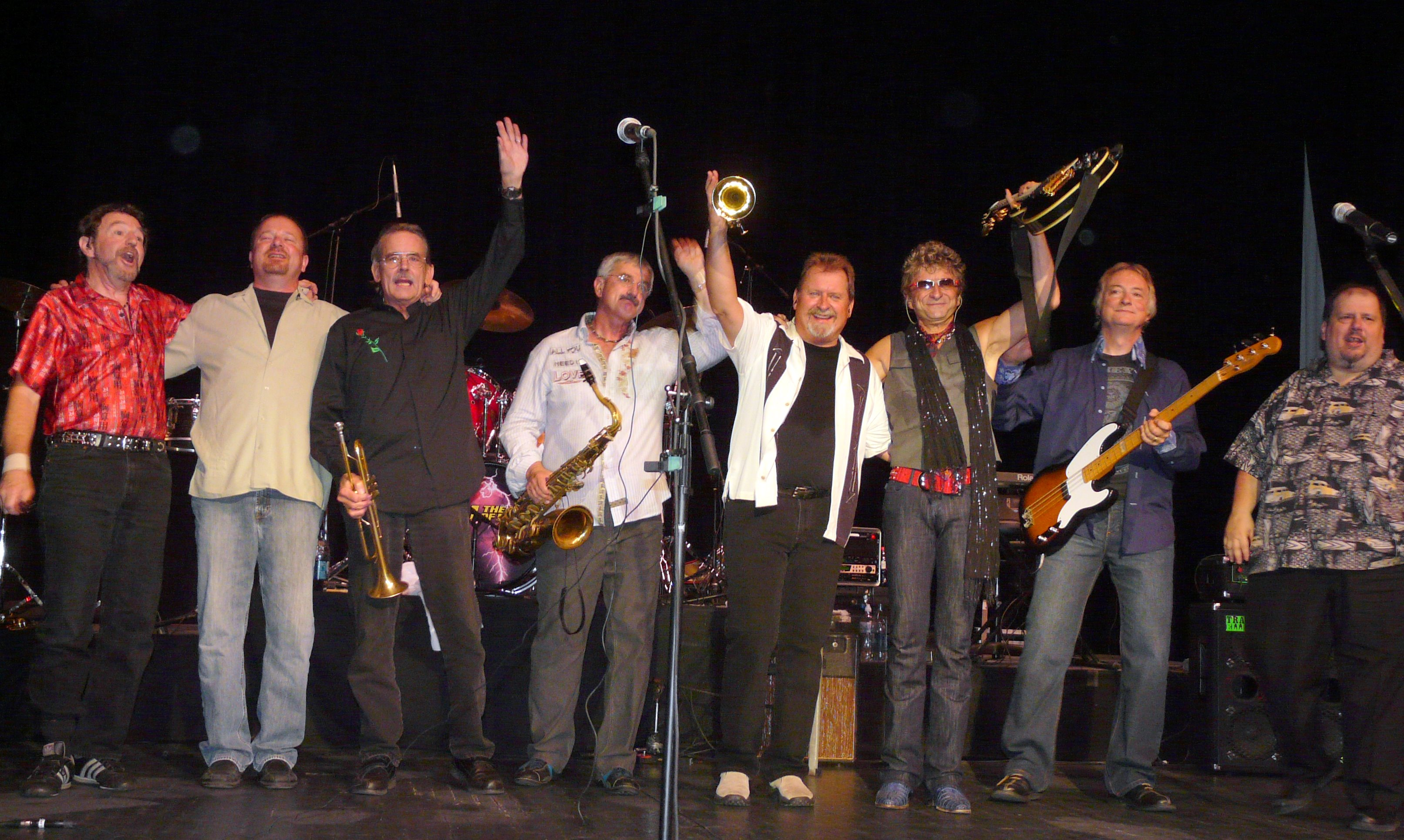
The band in 2008

By 2001, The Ides had expanded their schedule and returned to national touring. The band recorded a two-hour live performance for XM Satellite radio in Washington, D.C.. Also, "Vehicle" was used for an extensive national advertising campaign by General Motors.

A double live album, Beware: The Ides of March Live, captured their concert at the McAninch Center at the College of DuPage in Glen Ellyn, Illinois. This live set was released on Rhino Records in 2002. Handmade Records released Friendly Strangers, a double CD limited run set of the original Warner Bros. recordings.

In 2004, the Ides of March celebrated 40 years since their original formation, together with a series of multi-media shows emceed by Dick Biondi. The sold-out show at the Arcada Theatre in St. Charles, Illinois, can be seen on the DVD A Vehicle Through Time.

2005 saw "Vehicle" get further promotion when American Idol runner-up Bo Bice performed the song three times on the show. That same year, the Ides released their compilation CD, Ide Essentials. It included past hits ("Vehicle", and "You Wouldn't Listen") and versions of Survivor songs including "Eye of the Tiger", "High on You" and "Rebel Girl", as well as new material. It featured the new single "Come Dancing", and a re-release of the Ides' first recording "Like It or Lump It".

=== Up to date ===
The Ides sang their Christmas carol "Sharing Christmas" to a capacity crowd at the 6 o'clock Mass at Chicago's Holy Name Cathedral in 2005, at the request of the church's pastor, Father Dan Mayall. They sang along with Dick Biondi and have continued to perform at the cathedral's 6:00 Christmas Eve Mass since then. A total of four Christmas songs were recorded by them and appeared on the Sharing Christmas album; copies were sold to raise funds for Holy Name Cathedral's Thursday Night Suppers.

In 2006, The Ides' first two albums, Vehicle and Common Bond, were nationally re-released on the Collector's Choice label. Sony BMG released Ides of March Extended Play nationally; the album was culled from the band's live recordings.

In September 2010, the City of Berwyn, Illinois, dedicated Home Avenue between Riverside Drive and Cermak Road (the location of J. Sterling Morton High School West, the school most of the band members attended) to "Ides of March Way" in tribute of the band.

Ray Herr (born Raymond J. Herr Jr. on September 24, 1947, in Arlington Heights, Illinois) died on March 29, 2011, in Hainesville, Illinois, from esophageal cancer at age 63.

John Larson (born on November 6, 1949, in Elgin, Illinois) died on September 21, 2011, in Warsaw, Indiana, from cancer at the age of 61.

Chuck Soumar quit the band in 2011 to pursue other interests.

In 2014, the Ides celebrated the 50th anniversary of the band. The original four members – Bergland, Borch, Millas and Peterik – are still playing together (after Peterik's hiatus to form Survivor). They have released a 50th anniversary career retrospective box set and a DVD called "Last Band Standing", and continue to write and record new music. At their anniversary concert on September 27, 2014, they received a citation from the State of Illinois honoring their achievement as well as their charity work (the band established a scholarship fund at their alma mater, Morton West High School in Berwyn, Illinois).

As of 2018, the band continues to tour, both by themselves and as part of the "Cornerstones of Rock" series where they act as the house band for a variety of 1960s-era Chicago-area bands. In 2019, The Ides of March released an album on both vinyl and CD, marking their 55th anniversary. The recording is entitled "Play On", and was released on the Ides of March Records label.

On September 23, 2021, The Ides of March celebrated over 57 years together, and their return to touring after the COVID-19 pandemic, with a concert at The Potawatomi Hotel and Casino in Milwaukee, WI.

On March 15, 2024 (The date of "The Ides of March".), playing with the "Eye of The Tiger" Pops Orchestra, the band celebrated their 60th year of playing together with a sold-out concert at the Delora A. Norris Cultural Arts Center in St. Charles Illinois.

== Band members ==
=== Current members ===
- Jim Peterik – lead vocals, lead guitar, keyboards (1964–1973, 1990–present)
- Larry Millas – rhythm guitar, keyboards, bass guitar, vocals (1964–1973, 1990–present)
- Bob Bergland – bass guitar, tenor saxophone, vocals (1964–1973, 1990–present)
- Mike Borch – drums, percussion, vocals (1964–1973, 1990–present)
- Scott May – keyboards, vocals (1990–present)
- Tim Bales – trumpet (2011–present)
- Steve Eisen – alto saxophone, flute, percussion (2012–present)
- Henry Salgado – trombone (2016–present)

=== Former members ===
- Steve Daniels – trumpet (1967–1969)
- Ray Herr – bass guitar, rhythm guitar, vocals (1967–1970, died 2011)
- John Larson – trumpet, flugelhorn (1968–1972, 1990–2011, died 2011)
- Chuck Soumar – trumpet, percussion, vocals (1969–1973, 1990–2011)
- Conrad Prybe – trombone (1972, died 2019)
- Dave Arellano – keyboards (1972–1973)
- Dave Stahlberg – trombone (1990–2015)

== Discography ==
=== Albums ===
Title	Details	US	CAN
Vehicle	Release date: 1970; Label: Warner Bros.; Formats: LP	55	38
Common Bond	Release date: 1971; Label: Warner Bros.; Formats: LP	–	–
World Woven	Release date: 1972; Label: RCA; Formats: LP	–	–
Midnight Oil	Release date: 1973; Label: RCA; Formats: LP	–	–
Ideology 1966 to Present	Release date: 1992; Label: IOM; Formats: CD	-	-
Still 19	Release date: 2010; Label: Independent; Formats: CD	–	–
Last Band Standing	Release date: 2015; Label: Independent; Formats: CD	–	–
Outside The Box (Select Cuts from "Last Band Standing")	Release date: 2016; Label: Independent; Formats: CD	–	–
Play On	Release date: 2019; Label: Independent; Formats: CD Vinyl	–	–
"—" denotes releases that did not chart

=== Singles ===
Year	Title	Chart positions			
Year	Title	US	CAN	UK	AUS
1966	"You Wouldn't Listen"	42	21	-	-
1966	"Roller Coaster"	92	-	-	-
1966	"You Need Love"	-	-	-	-
1967	"My Foolish Pride"	-	-	-	-
1968	"Hole In My Soul"	-	-	-	-
1969	"One Woman Man"	-	-	-	-
1969	"Nobody Loves Me!"	-	-	-	-
1970	"Vehicle"	2	3	31	73
1970	"Superman"	64	64	-	-
1970	"Melody"	122	-	-	-
1971	"L.A. Goodbye"	73	63	-	-
1971	"Tie-Dye Princess"	113	-	-	-
1971	"Giddy-Up Ride Me"	-	-	-	-
1972	"Mother America"	-	-	-	-
1973	"Hot Water"	-	-	-	-

== See also ==
- List of 1970s one-hit wonders in the United States
