= Vehicle (The Ides of March album) =

Studio album by the Ides of March
- Released: June 1970
- Recorded: March 1970
- Studio: Columbia Studios
- Genre: Rock
- Length: 41:39
- Label: Warner Bros.
- Producer: Bob Destocki, Frank Rand

The Ides of March chronology
Vehicle (1970)	Common Bond (1971)

Vehicle is the debut studio album by the Ides of March, released in 1970. The single, "Vehicle", became the fastest selling single in Warner's history, after which the band was hustled into the studio to record a full album. Vehicle's songs range through many genres including rock, pop, soul and folk.

== Reception ==
Professional ratings
Review scores
Source	Rating
Allmusic	3/5 stars
The Village Voice	C−

In his retrospective review for Allmusic, critic Mark Deming wrote "the band sounds tight, enthusiastic, and emphatic on all ten tracks" and that the album "documents this band's limitations as well as its strengths, but ultimately it's a good week's work, and shows the Ides of March had more up their sleeve than their only hit." Conversely, Robert Christgau called the album "Schlocky... more schlock than anyone needs."

== Track listing ==
All songs written by Jim Peterik, except where noted.

1. "Vehicle" 2:56
2. "Factory Band" 3:02
3. "Sky Is Falling" 2:48
4. "Home" 3:38
5. "Wooden Ships/Dharma for One" (David Crosby, Stephen Stills, Paul Kantner / Ian Anderson, Clive Bunker) 7:14
6. "Bald Medusa" (Mike Borch, Peterik) 3:02
7. "Aire of Good Feeling" 3:14
8. "Time for Thinking" (John Larson) 2:30
9. "One Woman Man" 3:15
10. "Symphony for Eleanor (Eleanor Rigby)" (John Lennon, Paul McCartney) 9:42

=== Bonus tracks ===
11. "Lead Me Home, Gently"
12. "Superman"
13. "Melody"
14. "Vehicle" (single version)
15. "High on a Hillside"

== Personnel ==
- Jim Peterik - lead guitar, lead vocals
- Larry Millas - rhythm guitar, bass, keyboards, backing vocals
- Bob Bergland - bass, saxophone, backing vocals
- Ray Herr - bass, backing vocals
- Michael Borch - drums, percussion
- John Larson - trumpet, flugelhorn
- Chuck Soumar - trumpet, backing vocals

== Production ==
- Produced By Bob Destocki & Frank Rand
- Recorded & Engineered By Dick Dearborn & Richard Brayfield at Columbia Studios, March 1970
