= Orbit (disambiguation) =

In physics, an orbit is the gravitationally curved path of one object around a point or another body.

Orbit may also refer to:

== Science, technology and mathematics ==
- Orbit (anatomy), the socket in the skull that contains the eye
- Orbit (control theory), a particular case of the notion of orbit in group theory
- Orbit (dynamics), in dynamical systems
- Orbit (group theory), in group theory
- Orbit Semiconductor, a semiconductor manufacturing company
- Orbit (geometry) or revolution, a type of rotation

== Arts, entertainment, and media ==
=== Literature ===
- Orbit (anthology series), a series of original science fiction anthologies, published between 1966–1980
- Orbit (journal), an academic journal of eye disorders and surgery
- Orbit Science Fiction, a five issue science fiction anthology series, published between 1953–1954
- Orbit, a 1982 novel by Thomas Block, author of the novel Mayday (1979)
- Orbit, a 2006 novel by John J. Nance

=== Music ===
- Orbit (American band)
- Orbit (Japanese group), a Japanese-South Korean boy group
- William Orbit, an atmospheric techno composer
- Orbit (Rob Brown, Guerino Mazzola and Heinz Geisser album), 1997
- Orbit (William Orbit album), 1987
- Orbit, a turntablism technique
- Orbit, the fandom name of South Korean girl group Loona
- "Orbit", a song by 808 State from the 1993 album Gorgeous
- "Orbit", a song by Jay Chou from the 2003 EP Hidden Track
- "Orbit", a song by Nebula from the 2006 album Apollo

=== Other media ===
- Orbit: Earth's Extraordinary Journey, a three-part series on BBC Two
- Orbit, a character in the TV series Rob the Robot
- "Orbit", an episode of Blake's 7
- Orbit, a fictional airline in Flight Simulator X
- The Orbit, a blog hosting site co-founded by Greta Christina

== Brands and enterprises ==
- Orbit (gum), a brand of chewing gum manufactured by the Wrigley Company
- Orbit Books, a UK-based publisher of science fiction books and fantasy books
- Orbit Communications Company, a former DBS satellite service in the Middle East
- Orbit Instrument Corporation, developer of an early trackball device for flight control desks
- Orbit Irrigation Products, a manufacturer of consumer and professional irrigation and home improvement products
- Virgin Orbit, part of the Virgin Group responsible for satellite launches
- Volkswagen Orbit (1986), a concept car shown 1986

== Other uses ==
- Orbit Downloader, a download manager and malware application for Windows
- ArcelorMittal Orbit, a steel sculpture and observation tower in East London
- Orbits (sculpture), a public art work by Alexander Liberman
- Orbit Group, a UK housing association
- Orbit (horse), a Thoroughbred racehorse
- Orbit (mascot), the mascot of Major League Baseball's Houston Astros
- The Orbit, a transit-oriented development proposed around the future Innisfil GO Station
- Orbit (bus system), Huntsville, Alabama

== See also ==
- Orbital (disambiguation)
- Orbiter (disambiguation)
- Orbite Technologies
- Orbitz (disambiguation)
- Orbot
