= Tivoli Enterprises =

Former British company manufacturing amusement rides

Tivoli Enterprises Limited
- Company type: Manufacturers - Amusement Rides
- Industry: Manufacturing
- Founded: 28 July 1977
- Founder: Anthony Richard Woolls, Director (*Jan 1939, 13 Jan 1992)
- Defunct: 31 August 1998
- Headquarters: Howfield Lane Chartham, Canterbury
- Area served: Worldwide
- Products: Amusement rides

Tivoli Enterprises was a British company manufacturing amusement rides, located in Canterbury.

- The company's status is listed as "dissolved".
- It is known for building thrilling amusement rides.
- Born in England, this company was started by Richard Woolls.
- Amtech International acts as a representative for the American companies who want to buy their rides in the U.S. The official factory was located in Canterbury, Kent.
- Their list of rides include:
  - Force 10 / Paratrooper / Tip Top
  - Orbiter / Predator / Typhoon
  - Remix / Soundfactory / Extreme
  - Big Wheel
  - Move It
  - Scorpion / Troika
  - Spin Out—Made along with KMG (company) Rides.
  - Warp 10 / Exciter
