= Vessel =

Vessel(s) or the Vessel may refer to:

== Biology ==
- Blood vessel, a part of the circulatory system and function to transport blood throughout the body
- Lymphatic vessel, a thin walled, valved structure that carries lymph
- Vessel element, a narrow water transporting tube in plant

== Containers ==
- Bowl (vessel), a common open-top container
- Drinking vessel, for holding drinkable liquids
- Pressure vessel, designed to hold fluids at a pressure different from the ambient pressure

== Watercraft ==
- Watercraft, also known as a vessel, a water-borne conveyance

== Arts and entertainment ==
=== Film and television ===
- Vessel (film), a 2014 documentary film by Diana Whitten
- The Vessel (film), a 2016 film starring Martin Sheen
- The Vessel (web series), a 2012 British comedy web series
- "Vessels" (Helstrom), an episode of Helstrom
- "The Vessel" (The Outer Limits), a television episode

=== Music ===
==== Performers ====
- Vessels (band), a British post-rock and electronic band
- Vessel (solo artist), British electronic music producer and composer
- Vessel Drum and Bugle Corps, San Dimas, California
- The pseudonymous frontman and lead singer of Sleep Token, a British post-metal/indie pop band.

==== Albums ====
- Vessel (Dark Time Sunshine album), 2010
- Vessel (Frankie Cosmos album), 2018
- Vessel (Twenty One Pilots album), 2013
- Vessel (DVD), a video album by Björk, 2003
- Vessels (Be'lakor album), 2016
- Vessels (Ivoryline album), 2010
- Vessels (Starset album), 2017
- Vessels (Wolf & Cub album), 2006

==== Songs ====
- "Vessel", by Bodyjar from Role Model, 2013
- "Vessel", by Nine Inch Nails from Year Zero, 2007
- "Vessel", by Spratleys Japs from Pony, 1999

=== Other media ===
- Vessel (comics), a fictional Marvel Comics villain
- Vessel (video game), a 2012 video game developed by Strange Loop Games
- Vessels - characters in the game Hollow Knight

== Other uses ==
- Vessel (structure), a public structure in New York City's Hudson Yards
- Vessel (website), a subscription video service launched by the early team behind Hulu, including Hulu's former CEO Jason Kilar

== People with the surname ==
- Edy Vessel (born 1940), Italian actress and businesswoman
