= Orbiter (ride) =

Amusement park ride

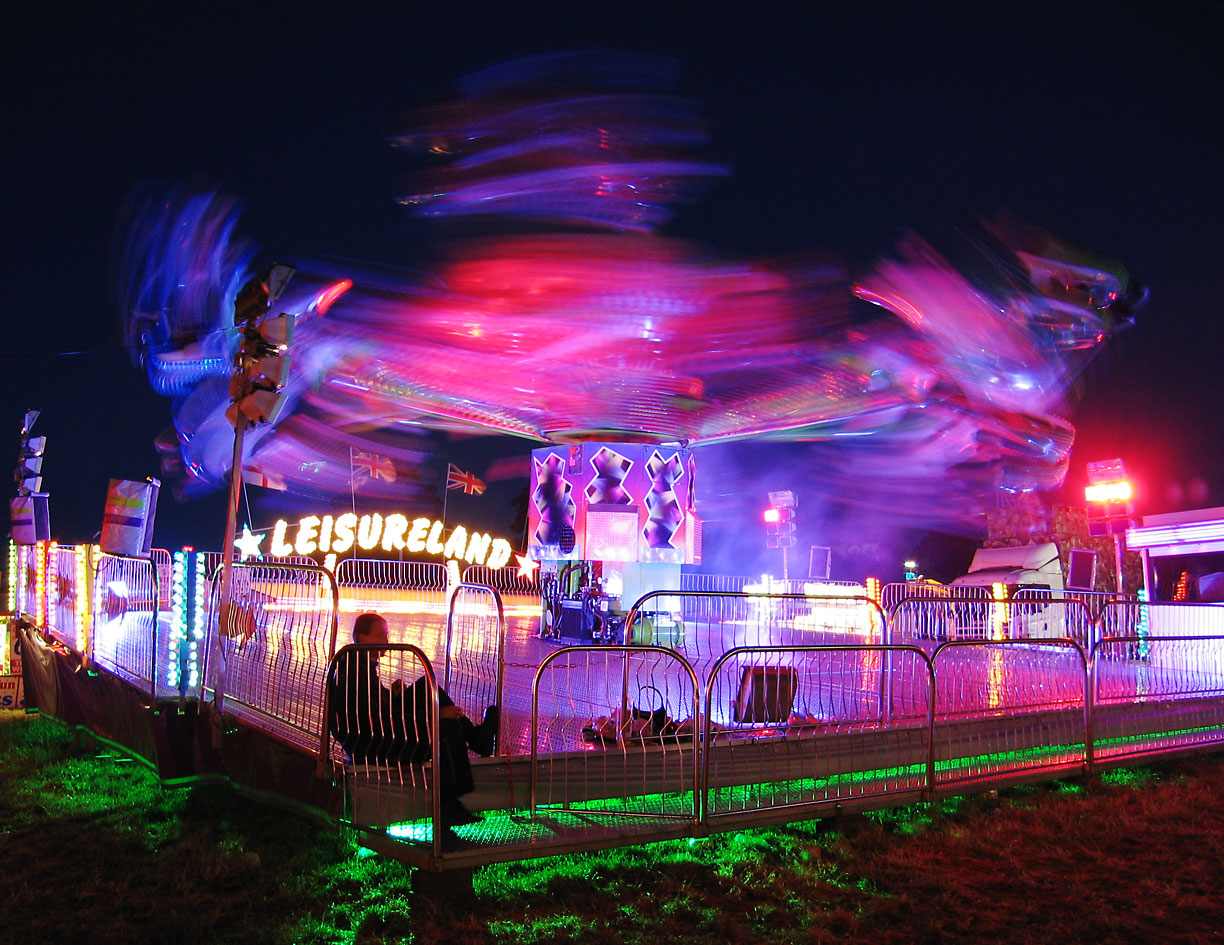
At night time, an Orbiter in full motion is a bewildering blur of lights.

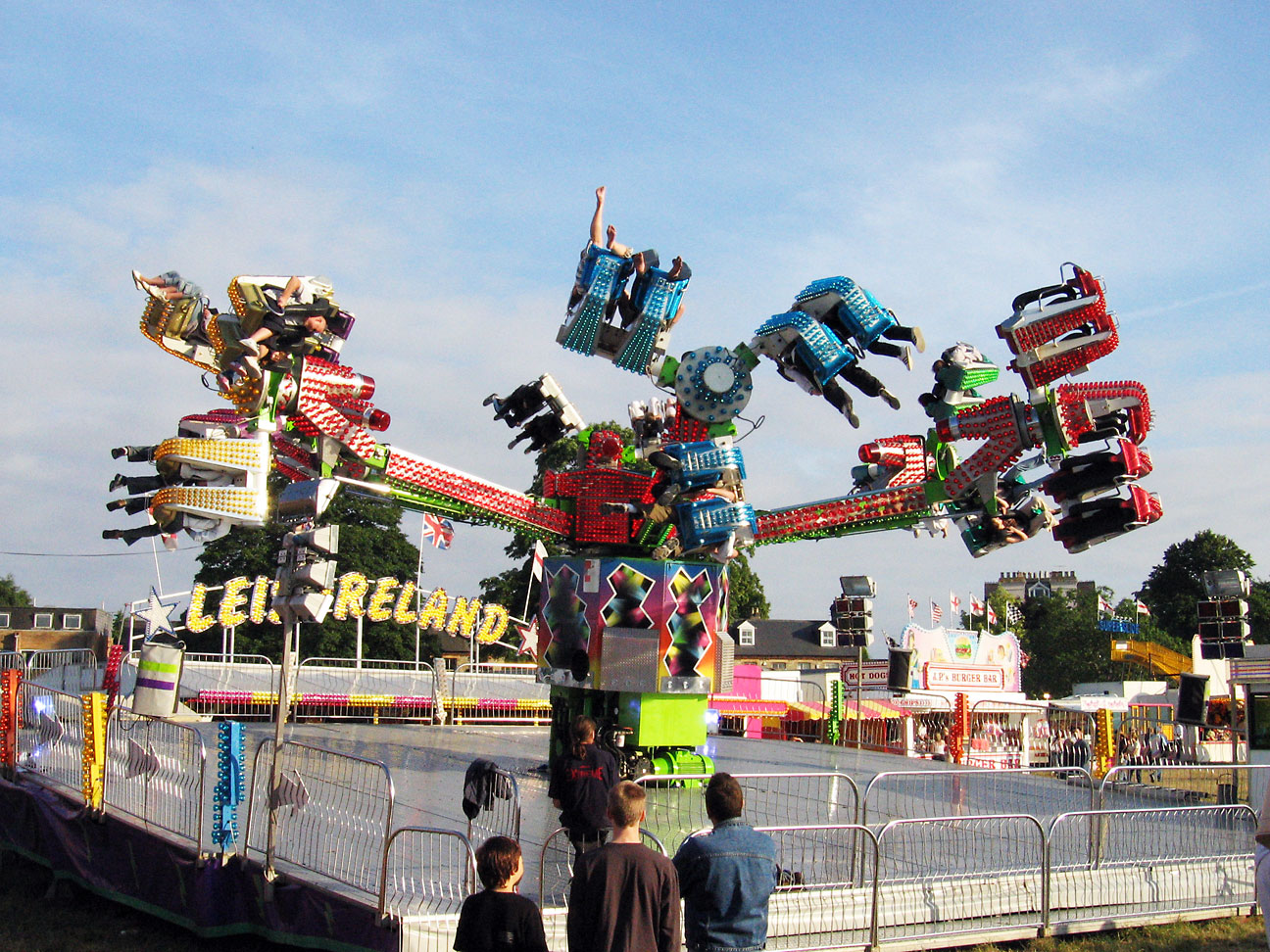
In daylight, it is a little easier to see how the cars are arranged.

The Orbiter is a fairground ride, which involves a number of cars spun by a rotating axis. The ride was first presented to the public in the summer of 1976, at Margate Dreamland's Amusement Park.

The ride was invented by Former Showman Richard Woolls in 1976, and was manufactured by Tivoli Manufacturing.

== History ==
The idea of the Orbiter was instigated by Richard Woolls and his Brother-in-law, Bob Nichols, as Woolls was experienced in Industrial Engineering. Showman Henry Frederick Smith invested in the blueprints and consequently became the first owner, taking delivery of the OB-1 prototype in 1976. The ride made its debut at Dreamland Amusement Park in Margate, Kent. The original OB-1 variant featured a pay box in the center of the ride, but after the Thurston family purchased it from Henry in 1980, following Henry's purchase of the 'Mark 2' OB-5 machine, the pay box was relocated to the side to improve customer footfall. Henry himself designed and built the new pay box. As of 2025, the original machine is located at Asia Fun Park in Malaysia. The Orbiter is made by Tivoli Manufacturing, a British company, and by their U.S. representatives, Amtech.

== Description ==
The Orbiter has a number of articulated arms radiating from a central rotating vertical axis. Each arm supports a cluster of cars, which are lifted through 90° into the horizontal position once the ride is spinning. At the same time, each cluster of cars rotates around its arm's axis.

The Orbiter's arms do not always tilt at the same height (90%). Some might tilt all the way, while others tilt little. Most Orbiters consist of six arms, and have three cars for each arm with up to two people sitting in each car. There is a metal lap bar that comes down on the car for the restraint.
