= Orbit Irrigation Products =

Orbit logo

Orbit Irrigation Products, Inc, located in Salt Lake City, UT, United States, is a manufacturer and supplier of irrigation products for residential and commercial markets and has been in business since 1986. It distributes over 2,000 products to 40 countries on five continents.

Orbit was acquired by Husqvarna Group in December 2021.

== History ==
In the 1950s, Max Ericksen founded a sprinkler and plumbing products distribution company. The company grew and developed a proprietary line of irrigation products. In the 1970s that division of the company was incorporated as Orbit Irrigation. Today, Orbit is a leading retail brand for irrigation and watering products.

== Product line ==
Orbit Irrigation Products provides products in five irrigation categories:

- Underground irrigation is provided by the WaterMaster product line that includes sprinkler timers, valves, accessories, tools and sprinkler heads.
- The DripMaster line is designed for delicate drip-water applications in areas with special needs (e.g., gardens, flower beds, container plants, trees and ground cover).
- Hose-end applications are met in the SunMate product line, including sprinklers, timers, pistols, nozzles and wands.
- Mist cooling is provided by the ArizonaMist product line for residential or commercial properties, as well as portable personal applications.
- The professional, or commercial, line of Orbit products are under the name Hydro-Rain. https://hydrorain.com/
