= Vehicle (song) =

1970 song by The Ides of March

Single by the Ides of March

from the album Vehicle
- B-side: "Lead Me Home, Gently"
- Released: March 1970
- Recorded: CBS Studios (Chicago)
- Genre: Funk rock
- Length: 2:56
- Label: Warner Bros. (US)
- Songwriter: Jim Peterik
- Producers: Bob Destocki, Frank Rand

The Ides of March singles chronology
"One Woman Man" (1969)	"Vehicle" (1970)	"Superman" (1970)

Audio
- "Vehicle" on YouTube

"Vehicle" is a song recorded by American rock band the Ides of March for their debut album Vehicle (1970). The song was released as the lead single from the album in March 1970 through Warner Bros. Records. Written by vocalist and frontman Jim Peterik, it is about a girl that often used him for her mode of transportation, leading Peterik to surmise that he was little more than her "vehicle". The arrangement includes a distinctive horn section riff, and Peterik's vocals were similar to David Clayton-Thomas, both of which caused some listeners to mistake the band for Blood, Sweat & Tears, who were also popular in that era.

"Vehicle" was a commercial success, and was purported to be the fastest-selling single in the history of Warner Bros. at that time. It peaked at number 2 on the Billboard Hot 100 in the US, while reaching number 3 in Canada, and just outside the top 30 in the United Kingdom. Despite this, the Ides of March never had another hit single, leaving them one-hit wonders, despite having 5 songs in the US Top 100 and 4 in Canada. Peterik, however, was to go on to found the rock group Survivor, and become a successful songwriter.

The song was used in an early 1980s Schweppes campaign in the UK featuring comedian Roy Jay and a 1998 commercial for the Ford Cougar.

== Background ==
Peterik wrote "Vehicle" as a tongue-in-cheek joke, having been initially inspired by anti-drug pamphlets passed out to high-schoolers. He expanded on the song's genesis in a piece for The Wall Street Journal:

At the time, I was madly in love with this girl named Karen. I had a souped-up 1964 Plymouth Valiant, and she was always asking for rides. I drove her to modeling school every week. I was hoping flames would ignite—but they didn't. I came home one day, dejected, and thought: all I am is her vehicle. And I thought: Wow! Vehicle! I came up with this song, taught it to the band, and the next thing I knew, we were recording in a CBS studio.

Peterik had an on-again/off-again relationship with the woman after the song came out, and they eventually wed.

Fourteen seconds of the completed "Vehicle" master tape (primarily the guitar solo) was accidentally erased in the recording studio. The missing section was spliced in from a previously discarded take.

I remember that kind of feeling of experimentation. I also remember 14 seconds of the master of "Vehicle" being erased! We were doing background vocals and suddenly 14 seconds were gone from the master. No way to retrieve it. The second engineer had hit the wrong button. We spent two hours thinking our career is over, because at this time we knew we had something. Luckily, there was a Take One. They inserted 14 seconds of Take One and I redid the vocals. And now I hear it every time. From the second "Great God in heaven" all the way up to the guitar solo—-when you hear how abrupt that first note of the solo sounds, that's an edit.

== Chart performance ==
It rose to number 2 on the Billboard Hot 100 chart the week of May 23, 1970, behind "American Woman" by the Guess Who. It was considered to be the fastest-selling single in Warner Bros. Records history at that time.

== Chart history ==
=== Weekly charts ===
Chart (1970)	Peak position
Australia (Kent Music Report)	73
Canada Top Singles (RPM)	3
UK (OCC)	31
US Billboard Hot 100	2
US Cash Box Top 100	6
US Record World Top 100	3

=== Year-end charts ===
Chart (1970)	Rank
Canada	55
US Billboard Hot 100 (1970)	85
US Cash Box	47

== See also ==
- List of one-hit wonders in the United States
