= Orbital =

Orbital may refer to:

== Sciences ==
=== Chemistry and physics ===
- Atomic orbital
- Molecular orbital
- Hybrid orbital

=== Astronomy and space flight ===
- Orbit
  - Earth orbit

=== Medicine and physiology ===
- Orbit (anatomy), also known as the orbital bone
- Orbitofrontal cortex, a part of the brain used for decision making

== Business ==
- Orbital Compute Inc., an American Orbital data center (ODC) startup
- Orbital Corporation, an Australian engine technology company
- Orbital Sciences Corporation, a U.S. satellite launch and defense systems corporation
- Orbital ATK, American aerospace manufacturer formed from the merger of Orbital Sciences Corporation and parts of Alliant Techsystems

== Transportation ==
- Ring road (or orbital road in some regions)
- Orbital (metro), a rapid transit line usually encircling a city centre
- Orbital engine

== Other uses ==
- Orbital (novel), a 2023 novel by Samantha Harvey
- Orbital (The Culture), artificial worlds from Iain M. Banks's series of science fiction novels, the Culture
- Orbital (band), an English electronic dance music duo, whose first single was 'Chime' [1989]
  - Orbital (1991 album)
  - Orbital (1993 album)
- Orbital (comics), a Franco-Belgian science fiction comics series
- Orbital piercing
- Orbitals (video game), a 2026 game by Shapefarm and Kepler Interactive

== See also ==
- Orbit (disambiguation)
