= List of Derren Brown shows =

The various stage and television shows performed by the psychological illusionist Derren Brown.

== Television series ==
=== Mind Control (2000–03) ===
Brown began his television work with three sixty-minute specials produced over two years. In 1999, he was asked by Channel 4 to put a mind-reading programme together. The six-part series Mind Control incorporated new footage with the best of his hour-long shows. Selected highlights from the first series were later made available on DVD as Derren Brown – Inside Your Mind.

Andy Nyman was originally intended to front the programme, but he wanted to concentrate on acting so Brown was recommended to the producers by comedian and close-up magician Jerry Sadowitz.

=== Trick of the Mind (2004–06) ===
Trick of the Mind was the title for Brown's next series, which ran for three consecutive series. Unlike Mind Control it is all completely new material. The second series started on E4 on 11 April 2005 and was repeated on Channel 4. The third series started on 26 March 2006. Trick of the Mind series 1 and 2 are available on DVD.

==== Waking Dead episode ====
In an episode first broadcast on Friday 6 May 2005, Brown claimed to have created a video game called Waking Dead which "is able to put roughly 1/3 of the people who play it into a catatonic trance". The video game is then placed in a pub. Brown then "kidnaps" the catatonic "victim" and places him in a real-life recreation of the video game, having him fire a paintball marker at actors pretending to be zombies and outfitted with explosive squibs.

=== Trick or Treat (2007–08) ===
Trick or Treat started on Channel 4 in 2007. The focus of the show is on one volunteer who receives either a good experience or a bad experience. The experience the volunteers receive is decided by which card they choose. If they choose the card that says 'Trick' they receive a bad experience, and if they choose the card that says 'Treat' they receive a good experience. In the first series of Trick or Treat, the volunteer had no choice over the matter as the cards were ambigrams; however, in the second series, they were replaced by two more clearly defined cards that were no longer ambigrams.

Episodes of Trick or Treat are not preceded by Brown's usual claim that no actors or stooges were used in the filming of the shows. Indeed, some participants (such as the ambulance crew in the last episode) are declared to be actors.

The second series of Trick or Treat began on 2 May 2008. The third episode showed a slight change from the previous format, as actor David Tennant became the first celebrity to be used for the show. The two had met at a party where Tennant expressed interest in Brown's work. While writing the second season Brown "thought it would be fun if one of the participants was well known".

The final episode of the second series featured all of the volunteers from the series who had previously received a trick or treat. This episode highlighted belief in superstition and the degree to which it can be applied.

=== Mind Control with Derren Brown (2007) ===
No.	Title	Original release date
1	"Shopping Mall Carpark"	26 July 2007
2	"Lying Car Salesman"	2 August 2007
3	"Exotic Dancers"	8 August 2007
4	"Receptive Children"	15 August 2007
5	"Assault Course"	22 August 2007
6	"Disappearing Sun"	29 August 2007

On 26 July 2007, the US based SCI FI Channel began showing six one-hour episodes of a series titled Mind Control with Derren Brown. Andrew O'Connor and Anthony Owen were executive producers, and the show was produced by Simon Mills who had produced the two previous series of Trick Or Treat as well as The Heist and The System for Objective Productions. Journalists in New York at the press announcement were shown preview clips of Brown "manipulating human behaviour" and given the promise of more surprises to come. Sci Fi's press release described the show as an "original US produced version". The show was a mix of new segments filmed in the US and older clips shown in earlier UK TV shows.

=== Derren Brown: The Events (2009) ===
No.	Title	Original release date
1	"How to Win the Lottery"	9 September 2009
2	"How to Control the Nation"	18 September 2009
3	"How to Be a Psychic Spy"	25 September 2009
4	"How to Take Down a Casino"	2 October 2009

Filmed for Channel 4 in front of a live studio audience, this new series, airing in September 2009 was made up of four one-hour specials, during which Brown attempted what he described as "some of the most incredible feats to date". The show consisted of a mixture of pre-recorded location pieces connected by theatre-based segments, with each of the four one-hour programmes building up to a major stunt performance. The first teasers broadcast were shown backwards. When played forwards, Brown explained that in his new series he would be revealing the "inner workings" of his tricks and showing the viewer "how to get away with it".

The stunts included a live TV broadcast in which Brown suggested that he had successfully predicted the winning National Lottery numbers, and another in which Brown played a subliminal video suggesting that viewers at home would feel that they had become stuck to their sofas. Brown also projected an image into viewers' minds and asked them draw it on paper. The series' final event was an attempt to predict the outcome of a roulette wheel, staking £5,000 of a chosen viewer's money on the outcome. The ball landed in the pocket numbered 30, adjacent to Brown's choice of 8.

=== Derren Brown Investigates (2010) ===
No.	Title	Original release date
1	"The Man Who Contacts the Dead"	10 May 2010
2	"The Men with X-Ray Eyes"	17 May 2010
3	"The Ghosthunter"	31 May 2010

Derren Brown Investigates began a run of three programmes on Channel 4 on 10 May 2010.

During the first program, Brown met with British psychic medium Joe Power. A second programme concerned a Ukrainian system of human development that claims to teach people to see without the use of their eyes, and in a third he met a "ghosthunter" from the United States. With these people he discussed their claims to have evidence of the paranormal.

=== Derren Brown: The Experiments (2011) ===
No.	Title	Original release date
1	"The Assassin"	21 October 2011
2	"The Gameshow"	28 October 2011
3	"The Guilt Trip"	5 November 2011
4	"The Secret of Luck"	11 November 2011

Derren Brown: The Experiments was announced on 4 October 2011 on his official blog. Brown said that each special was an "ambitious sociological experiment, in which the unwitting subject is a single person, a crowd, or even an entire town". Brown stated that 'Three of [the episodes] are relatively dark, looking into the darker side of human behaviour, and one of them is rather positive and jolly' on his blog.

The first episode, entitled "The Assassin", aired on 21 October 2011 and consisted of Brown successfully hypnotising an unwitting member of the public to 'assassinate' a celebrity revealed to be Stephen Fry. This technique was used as a comparison to theories regarding the assassination of Robert F. Kennedy by Sirhan Sirhan, who claims to have no memory of the event.

The second episode called "The Gameshow" aired on 28 October 2011. Brown hosted a show purportedly called "Remote Control", asking a masked audience to vote for the escalating fate of a contestant in an attempt to demonstrate the effect of deindividuation. The audience were repeatedly given two choices, positive and negative, that would affect the life of a man named Kris. The choices grew increasingly darker but they continued to embrace the negative options. It reached the point where the audience were happy to see Kris' television destroyed and Kris kidnapped by masked thugs. In the end, Kris was hit by a car, although it was revealed that it was a stunt performer. While that stunt was fake, all other things that happened to Kris were real. The theory is that taking away people's individuality and encouraging them to regard themselves as just part of a crowd makes them act in a way that will sometimes conflict with their personal morality.

The third episode, "The Guilt Trip", aired on 5 November 2011. Brown attempted to find out if he could convince someone through association to admit to a crime he or she had not committed. He worked through tricking a participant into distrusting his own memory and having excessive feelings of guilt, to the extent that he confessed to the murder of an actor with whom he had interacted and was later reported murdered.

In the fourth episode, "The Secret of Luck" which aired on 11 November 2011, Brown spread a rumour of a lucky-dog statue throughout the entire population of a town and documented the consequences.

The trailer for "The Experiments" was released on 11 October 2011. It is notably creepy, cutting between different people who ask what it takes to make someone behave out of character. All of them have been edited digitally so that they have mouths similar to ventriloquist dummies. It ends with a large group of people including Brown altogether, asking if we are in control of ourselves, before Brown tilts his head and walks off looking at his phone, with the others following his movements.

The Experiments won a BAFTA for Best Entertainment Programme at the 2012 awards in May 2012.

=== Derren Brown: Incognito (2026) ===
Announced on 12 February 2026, Derren Brown: Incognito is an upcoming six-part Channel 4 television series fronted by Derren Brown, described as a social experiment disguised as a reality show. In the programme, ten strangers from different backgrounds live together for seven days in a “mysterious institution” while concealing identities that may prompt instant judgements from others, with the format designed to explore prejudice, labels and first impressions. The series is produced by Brown’s Vaudeville Productions for Channel 4. An air date for the series has not yet been announced.

== Television specials ==
=== Derren Brown Plays Russian Roulette Live (2003) ===
On 5 October 2003, Brown performed Russian roulette, live on Channel 4, which was watched by over 3.3 million viewers. The stunt was performed at an undisclosed location, later revealed to be in Grouville, Jersey, due to laws in mainland Britain prohibiting private ownership of handguns. Most of the show involved the selection of a volunteer to assist Brown, who apparently would risk firing a live round into his own head, in a game of Russian Roulette. Twelve thousand people applied for the task and these were whittled down to five men, who were given additional psychological testing and trained to load a revolver. On the day of the stunt, James was chosen to be the only person in the room when Brown performed. James was required to load a single shot into a revolver with six numbered chambers. Brown aimed the revolver at his head and fired chambers 3 and 4, then fired chamber 5 while aiming at a sand bag hanging nearby; they were all empty. The tension mounted as Brown paused, then fired chamber 6 aimed at his head and then quickly fired chamber 1 towards the sand bag; the sand bag appeared to have been pierced.

The programme was initially condemned by senior British police officers, apparently fearful of copycat acts. In addition, Jersey police stated that "There was no live ammunition involved and at no time was anyone at risk" and "There is absolutely no way that the States of Jersey police would allow anybody to put themselves at risk and shoot themselves dead." When asked about the possible use of blanks in the act Brown responded, "But the frustrating and kind of ironic part of it was that even if it had been a blank that wouldn’t have made it any less dangerous. You shoot a blank next to your head and it will still kill you."

Brown himself defended the programme, saying, "It probably sounds odd. But as a magic-related performer, to have that even being asked: Was it real? Was it not real? That lifts it to a level that I'm very comfortable with. What's left is the fact that it was a terrific piece of television."

=== Derren Brown: Séance (2004) ===
Brown's next project, Derren Brown: Séance, aired on Channel 4 on 31 May 2004. He brought 12 students from Roehampton University together for a live séance. He held the event at Elton Hall in east London, claiming the location had a history of paranormal activity after 12 people killed themselves there in a suicide pact in 1974. There is no Elton Hall in east London and the filming actually took place at the abandoned Queen Elizabeth Hospital for Children, Hackney Road. Brown then proceeded to demonstrate the methods used by spiritualists.

The show attempted to involve the television audience and they were encouraged to get items to create a ouija board. Viewers who experienced "something unusual" during the show were invited to call a telephone number and some of these recordings were played in the show as the participants moved between rooms. Brown also warned viewers about the impending ouija board scene, advising those who objected for "religious reasons or otherwise" to stop watching the show.

Photographs of the 12 members of the suicide pact were shown on screen in a grid. Brown instructed viewers to choose one of the images that they "felt a connection with" before directing movements around the grid, which caused viewers to finish on the picture of "Jane". Ten of the students also chose Jane. During the following ouija board scene, the "spirit" guided the students to spell the name Jane. Two of the students were asked to write the name of a city using automatic writing, as were television viewers. Both students wrote London, which was revealed to be Jane's home in a pre-prepared envelope.

The final scene, the séance itself, saw the group "contact" Jane. One of the students was chosen as the medium and spoke as though she were Jane, giving details of her life. The group became increasingly distressed by events in the room, such as movement of items on the table. A letter and short film from Jane's sibling confirmed the accuracy of details revealed in the séance.

Brown explained some of the manipulations which had occurred, such as unconscious fraud and the ideomotor effect. The suicide pact had not actually taken place and "Jane" was introduced alive and well to the students at the end of the show. Brown later revealed it was a hoax designed to show how susceptible people could be convinced seances were real. In his book, Tricks of the Mind, Brown revealed that, contrary to claims made when the show was aired, Séance did not go out live. He said it was necessary to make viewers believe at the time that it was live.

Seance received 487 complaints to Channel 4 and 208 to Ofcom, making it the third most complained about show in history. Most were from church groups and came before transmission. The show was ultimately cleared of any wrongdoing.

=== Derren Brown: Messiah (2005) ===
Shown on 7 January 2005, Brown travelled to the United States to try to convince five leading figures that he had powers in their particular field of expertise: Christian evangelism, alien abduction, psychic powers, New Age theories, and contacting the dead.

Using a false name each time, he succeeded in convincing all five that he had certain powers and four openly endorsed him as a true practitioner. The fifth expert, the Christian evangelist Curt Nordhielm, whilst impressed by Brown's performance, asked to meet him again before giving an endorsement. The concept of the show was to highlight the power of suggestion with regard to beliefs and people's abilities, and failure to question them. Brown made it quite clear with each experiment that if any of the subjects accused him of trickery he would immediately come clean about the whole thing, a rule similar to one of the self-imposed rules of the perpetrators of the Project Alpha hoax. His conclusion was that people tend to hear only things that support their own ideas and ignore contradictory evidence; this is known in psychology as confirmation bias. In the section concerned with religious belief, he 'converted' people to Christian belief with a touch. Afterwards, he 'deprogrammed' them of any such belief. During the programme, Brown stated that he was not opposed to people holding religious beliefs and that he respected those beliefs. He also made clear that he himself had, at one time, been a committed Christian.

=== Derren Brown: The Gathering (2005) ===
The Gathering was a specially recorded as-live show at a secret location (hidden from the audience) with an invited audience of students from Roehampton University, celebrities, psychologists, psychics, taxi drivers, and magicians. It was filmed on 18 May 2005 and broadcast on 29 May. As part of the show, Brown recalled streets, page numbers, and grid references from the Greater London A-Z map. Pseudo-psychic "mind reading" and "remote viewing" activities were also recreated.

During the show, Brown hypnotised the audience as a group and convinced them that for approximately half an hour after leaving the room they would have no memory of the events. Furthermore, the word "forget" was intermittently flashed very briefly on the backdrop throughout the performance. A variety of audience members were interviewed in a vox pop segment afterwards; some could not recollect anything, but were nevertheless impressed. One of the most prominent stunts was asking a London taxi driver to choose a street in London and then choose and mentally drive a random route. This was achieved by drawing a line on a map of London made of stuck together A-Z pages. An envelope, which had been visible on-stage throughout the entire show, was then opened. This contained a card listing the page number and coordinate of the destination, an acetate with the route marked on it and a receipt for £8 (the estimated cost of the journey by the driver). The driver's route started at Buckingham Palace and ended at Shepherd's Bush Green, the street where the secret performance took place.

=== Derren Brown: The Heist (2006) ===
The Heist was shown on 4 January 2006 at 21:00, on Channel 4. In the show, Brown used his skills on selected participants who answered an advertisement. Under the guise of a "motivational seminar" (where they would allegedly learn Brown's skills) Brown recruited a number of participants, eventually manipulating a number of them into robbing a security van in broad daylight. "The Heist" has been described by Brown as one of the stunts of which he is most proud.

The robbery involved holding up a security van and guard (played by an actor) using a realistic-looking toy pistol that Brown had given the subjects earlier, and stealing a case filled with real money. Four people were selected to carry out the robbery from an initial field of thirteen, with three of them actually carrying out the "robbery". The idea was that, after the conditioning they received, they would voluntarily rob the van of their own accord. There was no mention of the "crime" to the participants, and they were not (directly) instructed to do it. The "robbery" was carried out as a result of the conditioning they received and was their own choice, not because of instructions from any third party, including Brown.

Brown associated colours, music and phrases to build the participants into a highly motivated state, converging all of those psychological empowerment tools into a single set-up. The seminar subliminally anchored freedom, childhood, opportunity and romance into various criminal acts. After having previously been convinced to steal sweets from a shop based in Codicote High Street in Hertfordshire, they experienced the euphoria that could be gained from criminal acts.

This programme also included a re-enactment of the Milgram experiment — originally carried out by Yale University psychologist Stanley Milgram in the 1960s – with the aim of selecting four of the most obedient of the group. Sixty-five percent of the subjects in this experiment were willing to administer what they believed to be lethal electric shocks to another person on the instruction of an authority figure (unbeknownst to the subjects, no electric shocks were actually administered). These were roughly the same results Milgram himself had observed.

=== Derren Brown: The System (2008) ===
The System, a Channel 4 special in which Brown shared his "100 percent guaranteed" method for winning on the horses, was first shown on 1 February 2008.

The show was based around the idea that a system could be developed to "guarantee a winner" of horse races. Cameras followed a member of the public, Khadisha, as Brown anonymously sent her correct predictions of five races in a row, before encouraging her to place as much money as she could on the sixth race.

To demonstrate the system to the viewer, Brown tossed a coin showing ten heads in a row to prove it was not impossible, just highly improbable.

After Brown had placed a bet of £4,000 of Khadisha's money on a horse in the final race, he explained how "The System" worked. He had started by contacting 7,776 people and split them into six groups, giving each group a different horse. As each race had taken place, ^{5}/_{6} of the people had lost and were dropped from the system. Brown had a different person backing each horse in each race, and one individual, Khadisha, won five times in a row. This was similar to the coin flipping earlier: rather than having a predictive technique, Brown had tossed a coin repeatedly until ten heads had come up in a row, taking over nine hours to produce the required film. Brown expressed the opinion that the principle behind "The System" (essentially confirmation bias or survivorship bias) is what is behind belief in spiritualism or homoeopathic and alternative medicine.

After the selected horse in the final race lost, and Khadisha was convinced that she had lost all her borrowed money, Brown told Khadisha to look again at the betting slip in her hand. The ticket showed the winning horse's name, meaning Khadisha kept her stake and received winnings of £13,000. Brown claimed that he had decided to bet on a different horse when he got to the booth.

At the end of the show, a title card explained that "at each stage of the process, participants who did not make it to the next round were offered a complete refund of any bets they had placed."

=== Derren Brown: Hero at 30,000 Feet (2010) ===
On 8 September 2010, Brown presented a new special on Channel 4 entitled "Derren Brown: Hero at 30,000 Feet". The programme showed Brown taking a man named Matt Galley, an ordinary person stuck in a rut in his life, coaching him to take control of life and achieve his aspirations. The programme was divided into chapters to introduce different stages in the transformation, many of which were undertaken without the subject knowing of Brown's involvement (via cooperation with Galley's parents and girlfriend to set up cameras in his house). At one stage, Brown visited Galley in the middle of the night, but left the subject believing it was a dream.

During the programme, Galley was put through a series of challenges: being the victim of an armed robbery, touching a live crocodile, illicitly entering a policeman's home, lying strapped to a rail track in a straitjacket while a train approached (the first challenge when he knew he was awake and that Brown was involved in this). The show culminated in Galley travelling on a plane where the pilot had supposedly been incapacitated.

Galley, who had not been on a plane in ten years and had a fear of flying, boarded a flight travelling from Leeds to Jersey, where he had been told that a fake game-show presented by Brown was to be filmed. The flight crew, stewards and stewardesses were real, but the rest of the passengers were actors. During the flight, the cabin crew announced that the captain had been taken ill and asked for a volunteer to land the plane. At the last minute, Galley volunteered. While walking up to the front of the plane he was placed into a trance by Brown. After the plane landed, Galley was placed into a cockpit flight simulator and woken up. He was talked through landing procedures by a person identified to him as an air traffic controller. Galley completed the challenge successfully and then emerged from the simulator to meet Brown and all the actors involved in the programme, plus his family and friends.

Brown responded to scepticism about the show on his blog, noting that many aspects of the show's production were edited from the televised version due to time constraints. He cited Donnie Darko, Fight Club, The Game, and Watchmen as influences for the show. Brown went on to say that "this has been my favourite show to work on – most ambitious, most involved, most demanding and by far the most joyful. I consider it my fondest and best...."

=== Derren Brown: Miracles for Sale (2011) ===
Derren Brown: Miracles for Sale is a feature-length programme about the controversial practice of faith healing. In the show, Brown attempted to turn a member of the British public into a "faith healer" and to convincingly give a faith healing show to church goers in Texas. The show premiered 25 April 2011 on Channel 4.

=== Derren Brown: Apocalypse (2012) ===
"Derren Brown: Apocalypse" is a two-part special that aired on Friday 26 October 2012 and concluded on Friday 2 November 2012. It centred around one man named Steven, who had been described as suffering from a "lazy sense of entitlement". In a trailer for the show, he said he was "lazy" and "irresponsible", while his mother said that sometimes she felt like he did not love her any more.

The show was an opportunity to give Steven a second chance at life and making him realise how important his life really is. The setup was that a meteorite hitting Earth had caused the end of the world. Steven supposedly woke up two weeks after the disaster in an abandoned military hospital to find that he is one of a group of survivors now living in a zombie wasteland. He made his way through a carefully planned storyline.

Much of the first episode concerned the process by which Steven was persuaded that the world was going to end. It attracted an estimated 2.3 million viewers, some of the highest Channel 4 had had over the preceding two years.

This show was said to have taken months of planning including hacking Steven's phone, controlling his news feeds and Twitter, recording special versions of TV and radio shows, and using over 200 actors.

=== Derren Brown: Fear and Faith (2012) ===
"Derren Brown: Fear and Faith" is the second of Brown's two-part specials which first aired on Friday 9 November 2012, with the second part airing the following week on Friday 16 November 2012. It focuses on the placebo effect.

In the first programme, Brown sets up a fake pharmaceutical company, 'Cicero Pharmaceutical Solutions', which claims to have developed a drug named 'Rumyodin', with the ability to inhibit fear. In fact, the pill is a placebo that is merely sugar. The placebo effect, amplified by the convincing façade of Cicero, helps most of the subjects of the fake clinical trial of Rumyodin overcome their fears. It is shown that Brown repeated the experiment with separate groups, to each of whom it was claimed Rumyodin had different beneficial effects, such as smoking cessation and allergy relief, again with positive results. By the end of the programme, Brown reveals that 'Rumyodin' is an anagram of 'your mind'.

In the second programme, Brown examines the psychology of religious belief. Reproducing a number of well-known psychology experiments, he shows how even non-believers can be susceptible to suggestions of a supernatural or religious nature. Subjects left alone in completely dark crypt report feeling a presence and seeing ghostly images. Subjects scoring their own performance in a test behaved more honestly when it was suggested there could be a supernatural presence in the room with them. Over the course of the programme he conducts a "Conversion Experience", whereby using purely psychological techniques he induces an apparent religious experience in Natalie, one of the subjects from the earlier experiments, a self-identified atheist.

=== Derren Brown: The Great Art Robbery (2013) ===
"Derren Brown: The Great Art Robbery" centres on Brown teaching a group of old age pensioners how to get away with a robbery using various techniques such as how to stay unnoticed as well as controlling fear and nerves. The OAPs then embark on a large-scale robbery, which involves stealing an expensive painting from art collector Ivan Massow. The catch, however, is that Derren openly tells Massow the exact time the robbery will take place and whom to look for. The show first aired on Friday 13 December.

=== Derren Brown: Pushed to the Edge (2016) ===
Derren Brown: Pushed to the Edge, broadcast on 12 January 2016, was advertised as Brown attempting to use social coercion to convince one member of the public, Chris Kingston, who doesn't know he's being manipulated or filmed, to push another person off a roof to their apparent death, during the fictitious launch of a charity called 'Push'.

Establishing the concept, Brown uses an actor on a phone posing as the Police to convince a member of the public to walk out of a shop with another person's baby. He states that the fictitious charity launch would be an attempt to see how far this effect could be taken, and would involve actors and celebrities, all of whom would be aware it was not real. Through an open audition for one of his shows, he conducts a simple experiment (whether they would simply copy other people as they sit or stand at the push of a bell) to shortlist four people (two men, two women) for their level of conformity, choosing Kingston as the subject. All participants were then told they had not been successful. Two months later, Kingston is persuaded that he has won a software contract with the charity, and he is invited to attend the launch.

At the launch, Kingston is induced into following the requests of the charity's director. He meets a wealthy donor, who then appears to die of a heart attack. He agrees to delay reporting the death and hide the body (replaced with a realistic dummy), and then passes himself off as the donor and gives a speech. After moving the body, Kingston then refuses to kick it (to bruise the body to make it look like he fell down a stairwell). After learning the donor is not dead but has a medical condition that creates the appearance of death, the pair confess to the other members of the charity's board, who then find the body is gone. Directed to the roof, the donor reveals he knows what they did to him and refuses to give the charity any money. The group forms a conspiracy to murder and pressures Kingston into being the one to push the donor off the roof. He refuses and walks away, and Brown then makes himself known to Kingston. Brown then reveals that the same process was applied to the other three unsuspecting finalists, who are shown through a series of clips to have all pushed the donor to his apparent death (prevented through the use of a safety harness). Closing the show, Brown urges viewers to push back against any group or ideology which seeks to manipulate them through the evolutionary power of social conformity.

The show became available on Netflix in February 2018, retitled Derren Brown: The Push.

=== Derren Brown: Sacrifice (2018) ===
In Sacrifice, unsuspecting participant Phil takes part in a faked medical experiment to increase his bravery and empathy, before being put in a situation where he must decide whether to take a bullet for a stranger or save his own life.

== Stage shows ==
Every two years, Brown and his collaborators prepare a new live show. Brown spends one month generating ideas that will equal previous ones without being repetitive, by looking through old books on Victorian and modern magic, spiritualism and suggestion etc. They then consider the practical details, prop lists and attempt to get budgets approved. Brown states "It's a show that relies on real people taking part, which means there is no way of rehearsing it without an audience to play their part. So I go out gingerly on the first night knowing that some parts will fail. And some parts always do."

=== Derren Brown: Live (2003–04) ===
Derren's first stage show began at the Tobacco Factory Theatre in 2003 near Brown's home in Bristol. It then grew into a major 2003/4 tour concluding with a London run at the Palace Theatre. The show was never recorded for television broadcast.

=== Something Wicked This Way Comes (2005–06) ===
Brown's second live stage show, Something Wicked This Way Comes, toured around the UK following its success in the West End. The tour began in March 2005 at the Cambridge Theatre and finished in May at the Hammersmith Apollo. The run was then once more extended into the following year, being performed and filmed for a final time at the Old Vic Theatre in mid-June 2006.

A 90-minute edit of this show was broadcast on 29 December 2006, 10 June 2007 and 17 June 2008 on Channel 4, on 10 May 2008, 17 January 2009 and 6 January 2012 on E4; a longer, unedited version was released on DVD in May 2008. The show won the Laurence Olivier Award for Best Entertainment Show 2006. The show was co-written and directed by his longtime collaborator Andy Nyman. The title originates from the Ray Bradbury novel, which is itself a quote from Act 4, Scene 2 of William Shakespeare's Macbeth. (The same verse also is the source of the title of Agatha Christie's By The Pricking of My Thumbs).

=== Mind Reader – An Evening of Wonders (2007–08) ===
Derren Brown at the Garrick Theatre, June 2008

Brown's third live stage show toured the United Kingdom in 2007 and 2008. Derren Brown, Mind Reader – An Evening of Wonders, initially toured for 42 dates from 29 April 2007 in Blackpool, and ended 17 June in Bristol.

The show toured again from February until April 2008 throughout the UK, and concluded with a West End run at the Garrick Theatre during May and early June. The West End run was a strictly limited season of 32 performances only. A performance from the last week of the tour at the Garrick Theatre was filmed for Channel 4 and aired on 13 January 2009.

Audience participants were selected at random by means of Brown throwing frisbees into the audience. The show included the following:

The mysterious box

- Gorillas – the introduction to the show was a video including gorillas playing table tennis to demonstrate change blindness. Brown then appeared and indicated that at some point during the show "a man in a gorilla suit will come onto stage and steal a banana". The challenge for the audience was to notice the banana being stolen. The banana was then successfully removed while the audience attention was directed elsewhere. Later in the show, when the gorilla came on stage more obviously, it was revealed that it was Derren in the costume.
- £500 v £5000 – Brown brought out a concealed box containing either £500 or £5000. The selected participant was asked specific questions by Brown and then asked to name what was inside the box. If he was correct, the contents would be theirs.
- 20 Questions – Brown played the game with 6 audience members on stage in a variety of different ways (e.g. face to face, with his back towards them and with them being told to not even give a yes or no answer in response to the questions).
- Tossed-Out Deck - Brown performed his own version of the Tossed-Out Deck Routine with three members of the audience in the first few rows.
- Psychic powers – Brown privately gave instructions to a participant (always a woman) on how to guess correctly playing cards which other people had selected. He then put the person in a trance and told her to forget everything he had told her.
- Number predictions – an audience member was told to contact someone on a phone (always a man) and ask various questions with the hope of the participant saying numbers which Brown had already written on a whiteboard. In reality, the person on the phone was made to say the serial number of a ten-pound note given to the audience member.
- Table-Turning – as a lead up to The Oracle Act, Brown fashioned various table turning acts in order to demonstrate the effects which led people to believe in supernatural occurrences in those days.

Start of the Oracle Act

- The Oracle Act – the main feature was a recreation of the act performed by the mediums and charlatans in the 1930s. During the interval, audience members had been asked to write personal questions and leave them in envelopes on the stage. Just by looking at the writing on the front of the envelopes (initials and row), Brown was able to deduce the type of person who was responsible for it and give various specific facts about the person including the exact question asked. He then blindfolded himself and continued in the same manner with almost perfect results. Nearing the end of the act Brown repeatedly asked for some water, which was not given to him. He then became more and more agitated until collapsing. After a brief pause, someone came out to check him and the curtain closed. Brown then stepped out from behind the curtain and explained that that was how the mediums in the 1930s would end their acts, and that was how he would end his.
- The Box – the culmination of the show was to reveal the contents of a box which was suspended from the roof of the stage and had been untouched and visible to the audience before and throughout the show. A scroll in the box was unraveled and showed that Brown had seemingly made predictions prior to the show about specific things which had come up in the show.

=== Enigma (2009–10) ===
Enigma is the name of Brown's 2009–10 stage tour, directed by Andy Nyman. It began in Chatham on Friday 17 April 2009, visiting various UK towns before ending in London with a month at the Adelphi Theatre starting Monday 15 June 2009. The show includes Brown attempting to put the entire audience into a trance (he makes it clear this is not hypnotism and will not affect everyone). At the end of the show Brown requests that audience members, particularly reviewers and the press, do not reveal the show's secrets and surprises to others to avoid spoiling the fun. The show toured the UK again during the first half of 2010. Enigma was nominated for an Olivier award on 8 February 2010, Brown's second nomination for an Olivier following his 2006 show Something Wicked This Way Comes. It was announced on Brown's blog that Enigma will be released on DVD as part of a box set containing three of his live shows Something Wicked This Way Comes, An Evening of Wonders and Enigma ready for a January 2011 release. Enigma was shown on Channel 4 on 6 January 2011 before the release of the box set. It also aired on both 7 and 8 January 2011, the latter forming a part of 'Derren Brown Night'.

=== Svengali (2011–12) ===
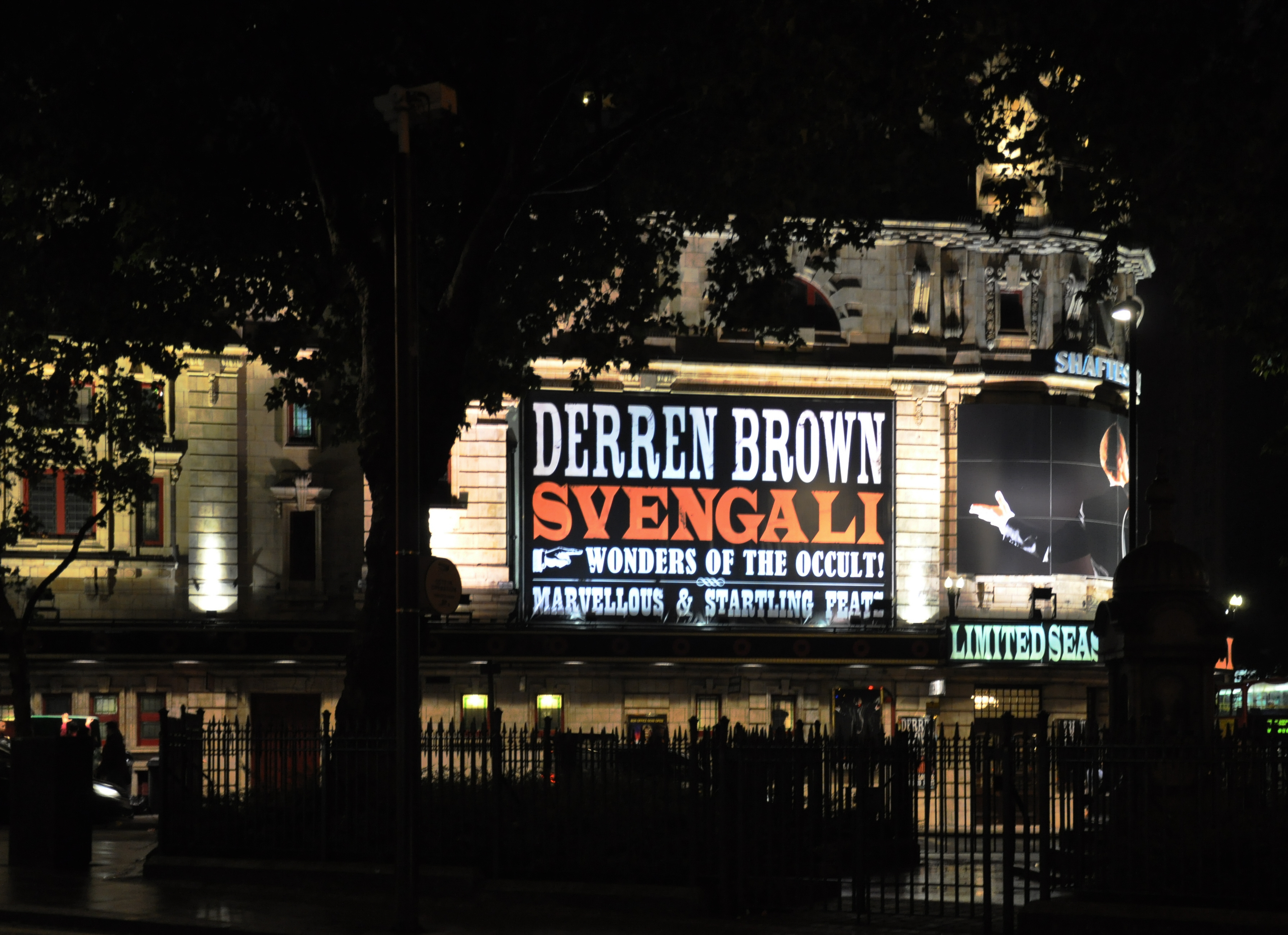
Advertisement for Svengali, Shaftesbury Theatre, London

Derren Brown's fifth tour, entitled Svengali, opened on 9 March 2011 in Brighton and ran until 11 August 2012, finishing up with a second London run at the Novello Theatre. It is Brown's first show that is not written in collaboration with Andy Nyman. Svengali was filmed for television and first broadcast on Channel 4 on 18 September 2012. The show won the Laurence Olivier Award for Best Entertainment Show 2012.

=== Infamous (2013–14) ===
Derren Brown's sixth live stage show, Infamous, toured the UK from March 2013 and visited Ireland in 2014. Derren Brown's website stated that it would "not be suitable for under 12s". A televised version of the show aired on Channel 4 on 22 September 2014.

During one performance of the show, a woman in the audience pushed her husband as a joke and he fell over the balcony. He managed to hang on to the upper circle and was not injured.

=== Miracle (2015–16) ===
Derren Brown's seventh live stage show, Miracle was filmed for television in London's Palace Theatre and first broadcast on Channel 4 on 10 October 2016. The show examined the subject of faith healing and the performance of miracles. In June 2018, the show was released on Netflix.

=== Underground (2017–18) ===
Showing in March and April 2017, Underground was an exclusive stage show to the Charing Cross Theatre in London (an underground theatre). It contained a collection of Brown's favourite bits of his previous stage shows as a warm-up for his first American shows. It was later extended to a full tour in the UK, which commenced after Brown returned to the country from 'Secret', followed by a run at the Playhouse Theatre in the London's West End.

=== Secret (2017, 2019) ===
Secret is Derren's eighth live stage show and his first live stage show to be performed in the United States of America. Secret had its first performance 21 April 2017 at the Atlantic Theater Company in New York City and ran until 25 June 2017. The show returned to New York on Broadway at the Cort Theatre running from September 15, 2019 (previewing from September 6) to January 4, 2020.

=== Showman (2021-23) ===
Showman is Derren's first brand new show since Miracle which was originally due to commence in March 2020, however was postponed due to the COVID-19 pandemic. The tour eventually opened in August 2021 at the Theatre Royal, Plymouth before touring the UK and Ireland until December 2022, followed by a run at the Apollo Theatre in London's West End from December 2022 until March 2023.

=== Derren Brown Presents: Unbelievable (2023) ===
Derren Brown and Andy Nyman wrote and produced Unbelievable. The show consists of performances by seven magicians who Brown has worked with previously, though he does not appear on stage. It premiered in Colchester in July–August 2023 and continued with a run at the West End.

=== Only Human (2025-2026) ===
Derren's latest show; performed in a UK tour in 2025-2026. The show will finish with a run at London's West End.
