= How to Be a Psychic Spy =

- Derren Brown: The Events episode
- The programme involved viewers guessing the design on a concealed painting, which was revealed to be concentric circles in the style of Stonehenge.
- Episode no.: Episode 3
- Directed by: Simon Dinsell
- Written by: Derren Brown; Andy Nyman; Iain Sharkey
- Original air date: 25 September 2009
- Running time: 60 minutes (with advertisements)

Episode chronology
← Previous "How to Control the Nation"	Next → "How to Take Down a Casino"

"How to Be a Psychic Spy" is the third special in British psychological illusionist Derren Brown's The Events television series. In the programme, supposedly as part of an experiment into remote viewing, Brown invited viewers to guess what was painted onto a concealed canvas. He later revealed that he attempted to subliminally influence viewers' choices by placing advertisements in major newspapers instructing them to draw concentric circles.

The special was first broadcast on Channel 4 in the United Kingdom on 25 September 2009, when it was viewed by 1.8 million people.

== Events ==
Derren Brown introduces a picture, wrapped in newspaper, that has been standing on a closed bridge in London's Science Museum for a week: only museum curator Katie, who drew it, knows what the "simple design" on it is. Brown describes how, for the week that it was on display, people who visited the museum or the experiment's website could guess what the design was. He instructs viewers to have a pen and paper ready, and that they will take part in a "nationwide remote viewing experiment".

In a segment recorded before an audience, Brown appears to make bricks disappear and reappear in a box by clicking his fingers, and two volunteers experience the perceived difference in weight as he does so. He opens the box, and demonstrates it to be empty: he says that this technique of "propaganda" was used by French magician Jean Eugène Robert-Houdin.

He goes on to describe the "psychic arms race" between Russia and the United States in the 1960s and 70s, and how they spent millions of dollars on developing "superhuman powers" during the Cold War. He shows footage, leaked by the Soviet KGB, appearing to show Nina Kulagina rotating a compass needle with her hands, thus beginning competition with the American CIA; Brown hypothesises that she used magnets. He then involves an audience member in a trick involving a light bulb, in which he uses the bulb as a metaphor for confirmation bias and scepticism regarding psychics and the paranormal.

Footage from early September, when Brown asked the museum's curator to paint and wrap the design, is shown. After the film, Derren talks to Katie, who is in an isolation tank in an unknown location, and says that she will "mentally project" the image to viewers; the camera zooms in to her eyes. He tells viewers, and a crowd in the museum, to draw what they imagine the design (which he says is likely to be "shapes interacting") to be, during the following advertising break. After the break, Brown asks viewers to stop drawing, and says that museum staff will now examine the suggestions of the crowd and those left by visitors.

A segment entitled "The Mirror Man" is shown, in which Brown influences a member of the public to subconsciously mirror his actions and steal a television from an electronics shop on Tottenham Court Road, supposedly in the same manner used during the Cold War on "sleeper agents". Back with the audience, Brown introduces "The Expert", featuring Dr Wayne Carr, who attempts to remote-view a location in London. He writes many pages featuring words and drawings and selects some descriptions that match the location, a fountain depicting the Horses of Helios, but Derren points out after the film that many inaccurate descriptions were also suggested.

In the museum, four designs are revealed to be the most prevalent: concentric circles, Stonehenge, trains and horses. Brown asks viewers to submit what they drew by text, and messages appear throughout "Guess Who?", a segment in which Derren plays a real-life version of the board game with a court illustrator. Brown introduces "The Bat Man", a film about Daniel Kish, a blind man who uses echolocation to sense his surroundings by making clicks with his mouth.

At the museum, it is revealed that approximately 30–35% of people there drew concentric circles. The museum rejoins Katie, and the painting is opened: it is of circles, and she says that she thought of Stonehenge, which about made up around 10% of drawings in the museum.

Derren reveals that the museum scenes are being recorded three weeks prior to the broadcast, and that small advertisements instructing readers to draw circles will appear in major British newspapers (The Sun, Daily Mail, The Guardian, The Telegraph, The Independent, The Mirror, The Times, Daily Express, The Star, London Lite, Evening Standard and The Metro) on Friday 25 September, the special's airdate; he explains that viewers who drew Stonehenge were subconsciously influenced by them, but that the design's popularity at the museum remains a mystery. Katie emerges and discovers her location: the camera pans out, revealing that she is at Stonehenge.

== Broadcast and reception ==
The programme was first broadcast on Channel 4 on 25 September 2009 at 9 pm, and later made available on the channel's catch-up service, 4oD; it ran for one hour, including three advertising breaks. The special was viewed by 1.8 million people, a significant drop from Brown's previous special, "How to Control the Nation", which gained over 3 million viewers.

The Guardian's Heidi Stephens commented that the special was "really interesting, and worth it just for Daniel [Kish] and his sonar, but I'm feeling a bit short-changed". She also noted that the concentric circles design was present in the museum's decor and the shot of Katie's eyes.
