= How to Take Down a Casino =

- Derren Brown: The Events episode
- Episode no.: Episode 4
- Directed by: Simon Dinsell
- Written by: Derren Brown; Andy Nyman; Iain Sharkey
- Original air date: 2 October 2009
- Running time: 60 minutes (with advertisements)

Episode chronology
| ← Previous "How to Be a Psychic Spy" | Next → — |

"How to Take Down a Casino", also called "How to Beat a Casino" or "How to Beat the Casino", (Note: The special's on-screen title reads "How to Take Down a Casino", but it was referred to in trailers and schedules as "How to Beat a Casino" and on the Channel 4 website as "How to Beat the Casino".) is the fourth and final special in British psychological illusionist Derren Brown's The Events television series. The episode featured both live and pre-recorded segments, and showed Brown attempting to win £175,000 by placing money that he had taken from a member of the public on a roulette wheel in an undisclosed European casino.

The special was broadcast on Channel 4 in the United Kingdom on 2 October 2009, when it received over two million viewers. It gained attention due to the stunt's failure at the end of the programme, and creator Derren Brown's apologetic posts and YouTube video.

== Events ==
Broadcasting live from a van in an undisclosed location in Europe, Derren Brown tells viewers that he will bet £5000 taken from a member of the public on a single casino roulette wheel number. He plans to win £175,000 for the person from whom he took the money.

A pre-recorded segment is shown: Brown demonstrates "taking a gamble" by getting an audience member to choose from four cans of aerosol paint; she sprays two empty cans into the faces of Derren and another audience member, one filled with water into her own face, and a fourth, containing paint, onto a stencil predicting the order in which she would choose them.

A film called "The Expert" is played, in which The Real Hustle's Paul Wilson demonstrates illegal sleight of hand tricks used in the card game blackjack and discusses the possibility of using concealed computers to calculate the ball's movements; Brown concludes that, because computers would be detected, he must perform the calculation in his head.

After an advertising break, Derren speaks over a map of Europe, saying that they cannot film due to the risk of their location being recognised. In another pre-recorded segment, Brown explores the concept of luck and the notion that "lucky" people are those who take more opportunities. He plays a game involving two audience members involving two matchboxes and a £20 note: the unlucky person ends up with it, but an instruction to give it to the other person is written on the note.

In a film called "Speed", Derren meets with Timothy Westwood and a member of the Sussex Police. Brown estimates the speed of cars on a busy motorway—he says that he uses triangulation; his guesses are confirmed to be exactly accurate using a speed gun.

The recorded segment ends as Brown says that he is about to telephone the viewer: after a failed attempt to dial, he gets through to Ben—a camera crew outside Ben's house films through a window as Derren guides him out of his house and into a production truck. A clip is shown of Brown putting Ben into a trance and instructing him to withdraw £5000 from his bank.

Another film, "Trajectory", is shown: Derren attempts to mentally calculate the trajectory of a ball thrown into a squash court and predict where it lands on a numbered grid: he correctly selects the number 37 just after the ball is thrown. In a recorded clip, Brown demonstrates the method he will use to keep track of the ball by tapping his feet. He thanks viewers for watching the Events series, and passes over to a live feed inside the casino, filmed using concealed cameras. Brown bets on number eight, but the ball lands on the adjacent 30; he apologises to Ben for being "one off", and promises to return his £5000.

== Broadcast and reception ==
The programme was first broadcast on Channel 4 on 2 October 2009 at 9 pm, and later made available on the channel's catch-up service, 4oD; it ran for one hour, including three advertising breaks. According to BARB, the special was viewed by 2.18 million people.

After the broadcast, Derren Brown said on his blog that he was "still reeling from tonight's escapade", but that "I called Ben as soon as I could and he doesn't hate me". Several days later, Brown posted a video on YouTube in which he impersonated Family Guy's Stewie Griffin and self-deprecatingly called the ending an "epic fail", saying that he "fucked it up"; the Mirror newspaper called the video "bizarre".

Heidi Stephens of The Guardian, however, praised the anticlimactic ending, saying that "Losing was a risky strategy, but brilliant" and calling Brown a "master of surprise".
