= How to Control the Nation =

- Derren Brown: The Events episode
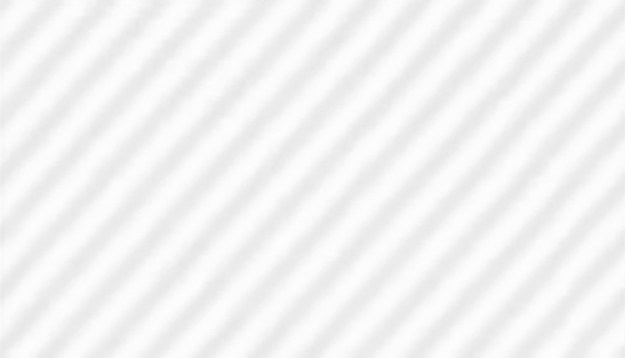
- The special centred around a subliminal film that consisted of rotating lines and could supposedly "stick" viewers to their seats.
- Episode no.: Episode 2
- Directed by: Simon Dinsell
- Written by: Derren Brown; Andy Nyman; Iain Sharkey
- Original air date: 18 September 2009
- Running time: 60 minutes (with advertisements)

Episode chronology
← Previous "How to Win the Lottery"	Next → "How to Be a Psychic Spy"

"How to Control the Nation" is the second special in British psychological illusionist Derren Brown's The Events television series. It features Brown playing a short "subliminal film" intended to make viewers who watched the programme unable to stand up from their seats. Although most segments were pre-recorded and showed Brown investigating and performing subliminal techniques, the show was partially broadcast live, and Brown spoke with viewers who had been affected by the film on the telephone.

The programme was broadcast on Channel 4 in the United Kingdom on 18 September 2009, when it was viewed by over 3 million people. It received media attention due to Brown's previous stunts, as well as viewers' stories and videos of them being "stuck" by the broadcast.

== Events ==
The programme opens with Derren Brown addressing the viewers, saying that he has produced a subliminal film that will "stick you to your seats at home". A warning that "subliminal messages will be flashed during this show" appears onscreen, along with Brown's usual "no actors or stooges" disclaimer. Brown tells viewers to have their telephones at hand when the film is played, and that he will talk to some of them live following the broadcast.

A pre-recorded film is played in which Brown demonstrates techniques of subliminal suggestion to an audience, asking a woman to choose from "win" and "lose" cards: firstly a simple choice between two unseen cards, then a choice from ten cards, then twenty people who have either word on the back of their T-shirt. In all cases, she picks the only "lose" card; Derren attributes the second choice to ultraviolet ink, and the third to white rectangles on participants' T-shirts. He states that these techniques are similar to those used in the film.

Brown then introduces a group who will be watching the film in a cinema as it is broadcast. In a recorded segment, Derren presents a "potted history" of subliminal techniques, including their purported use by James Vicary to sell refreshments in United States cinemas, and inclusion in Vance Packard's book The Hidden Persuaders. He introduces the concept of "perception without awareness", and shows a film of himself demonstrating PWA techniques by convincing a woman to mentally select a particular toy, a stuffed giraffe, from the many in Hamleys. Examining the film before the audience, he focuses on his use of suggestive speech, hand movements and decoration of the store.

Brown plays a piece of music which he says will give one audience member a strong feeling that they should volunteer themselves: a man does, and he takes part in a trick in which Derren predicts which chair, pen and order of the numbers 1–3 he selects, as well as the number of his ticket stub. A film is shown in which Brown dresses as a homeless beggar and collects £350 from members of the public in under an hour using a subliminal questionnaire and shop window decorations; one man gives his shoes.

An image of a man tied to a chair is flashed (this happens two more times, before and after the film) as Brown introduces the next segment: a "screen test" of six versions of his film. Subjects are affected in different ways, ranging from slight dizziness to intense trauma; some are unable to stand up. Brown says that the film will not be effective if posted on the Internet, and advises certain viewers not to watch it. The telephone number is given, and viewers are instructed to sit in a certain position and not to "fight" the suggestion; Brown says that those who are most open to the film will be stuck to their seats.

The one-minute film—grey lines rotating before a white background, accompanied by hypnotic music—is shown. Derren describes the sticking sensation and instructs viewers to relax; he interviews the cinema audience, many of whom cannot stand. Calls are taken from viewers who were stuck while instructions appear onscreen. A "clearing tone" is then played, and viewers are instructed to stand up: Derren clarifies that the film contains no subliminal messages, and that "it works through suggestion".

== Broadcast and reception ==
The programme was first broadcast on Channel 4 on 18 September 2009 at 9 pm, and later made available on the channel's catch-up service, 4oD; it ran for one hour, including three advertising breaks. It was watched by 3.1 million people, a 12.8% share, with an additional 600,000 people watching on the timeshift channel, Channel 4 +1. "How to Control the Nation" attained the second-highest viewing figures of the night on British terrestrial television, but was beat by BBC One's Strictly Come Dancing. The first episode of Peep Show's sixth series was broadcast immediately following the special.

Heidi Stephens of The Guardian called the show "really interesting", but said that its ending was "somewhat underwhelming"; she commented on the programme's competition with Strictly Come Dancing and speculated that Brown's instructions beforehand were more important than the film itself.

Channel 4 stated that over 50,000 calls were received within three minutes of the film being shown. Numerous people who were stuck recorded their reactions and posted them online: Derren Brown mentioned them on his blog and posted viewer Vicky Green's video of her struggling to stand up. Some viewers reported being immobilised for extended periods of time following the broadcast. Ofcom, the UK's broadcasting regulator, received five complaints about the episode, though they said the programme was not in breach of their regulations.
