= Thaandavam =

- Theatrical release poster
- Directed by: A. L. Vijay
- Written by: A. L. Vijay
- Produced by: Ronnie Screwvala; Siddharth Roy Kapur
- Starring: Vikram; Jagapati Babu; Anushka Shetty; Amy Jackson; Lakshmi Rai
- Cinematography: Nirav Shah
- Edited by: Anthony
- Music by: G. V. Prakash Kumar
- Production companies: UTV Motion Pictures; ShowMaker Regional Pictures
- Distributed by: ShowMaker Regional Pictures
- Release date: 28 September 2012
- Running time: 163 minutes
- Country: India
- Language: Tamil

Thaandavam (transl. Dance) is a 2012 Indian Tamil-language neo-noir action thriller film written and directed by A. L. Vijay. The film stars an ensemble cast with Vikram, Jagapati Babu, Anushka Shetty, Amy Jackson, Lakshmi Rai, Nassar, Santhanam, Raj Arjun and Saranya in pivotal roles It is produced by UTV Motion Pictures and features music composed by G. V. Prakash Kumar. Thaandavam was released worldwide on 28 September 2012.

== Plot ==
31 December 2010: At 11:59 pm, a sudden bomb blast occurs in London, killing several people.

A year later: A blind man named Kenny Thomas lays flowers on the memorial and mourns someone's death during the bomb blast. He is provided with secret details by a mysterious woman. Kenny then takes a taxi driven by Sathyan, a comical Tamilian. He drops Kenny at a place and waits for him to return, but Kenny goes inside, kills a person, and throws him down.

Upon seeing the corpse, Sathyan flees; Kenny is shown to produce a sound from his mouth to find his way, which is later revealed to be echolocation. Kenny plays the piano at a church, and because he is blind, he has many people care for him. In the meantime, he carries out two more murders, taking the same taxi driven by the innocent Sathyan, following instructions from the mysterious woman.

Sara Vinayagam, a British-born Anglo-Indian woman, wins the Miss London title, and to build her social profile, she goes to Kenny's church and acts like she is helping out there. Initially, Kenny does not like her, but eventually, they become friends. Sara's father is a doctor who supports Kenny. Inspector Veerakathi, a British Tamil citizen, is the officer in charge of investigating the murders.

As the autopsy of the murdered victims takes place under Sara's father, Veerakathi visits him and learns about Kenny, who is admitted there for a small accident. Veerakathi initially suspects Kenny but is not convinced. Sathyan is found at all the murder locations, and the police arrest him, suspecting his involvement in the murders. Sathyan manages to find a picture of Kenny from a local newspaper and informs Veerakathi.

Sathyan is released and meets Sara. Both of them go to a place (one that she learns of from Kenny's phone, which he missed during a fight with local thugs). They reach there in time to see Kenny almost kill a steel company owner named Victor. Kenny flees the scene after sensing them and takes Sathyan's taxi to escape. Due to his blindness, he runs the taxi into a river, along with Sathyan and Sara. They get out and reach the riverbank. While escaping, Sara and Sathyan are stopped and confronted by Geetha, who reveals Kenny's real identity:

Past: Kenny was a RAW officer in India, whose real name is Shivakumar. Shiva and his close friend Sharath completed various missions for the government. Shiva married Meenakshi, a conservative eye doctor in Delhi. Initially distant, both became close as time passed, albeit without expressing love for each other. Meenakshi had decided to express her love to Shiva on New Year's Day (which turns out to be his birthday).

Meanwhile, Sharath handled a case where an Indian Army secret (a flowchart) about a WMD went missing. Shiva showed interest in the case and left for London under an alias. A former Indian policeman named Kenny helped him. Shiva found an important clue, but Sharath was injured during a fight. Shiva was shocked to find his plans leaked and was chased by the L.C.P.D, following a series of incidents.

Shiva soon realized that Sharath was the mastermind behind the missing flowchart, as he sold it to a terrorist group with some help from London-based militants. Shiva uncovered the entire plot and asked Sharath to surrender, but he was shocked to know that Meenakshi had also come to London along with Sharath (to surprise Shiva on his birthday and propose to him). To save her, Shiva obeyed Sharath's order and went to a place (with Kenny), where a sudden bomb blast occurred, killing Kenny and Meenakshi and blinding Shiva.

Present: Geetha reveals that she's Kenny's wife and decided to take revenge on those responsible for the deaths of Kenny and Meenakshi. She forms a team with Shiva and joins him in a school where he learns echolocation from Daniel Kish. After that, Geetha reveals to Kenny the people who caused the disaster, including even Sharath, which formed the motive for the murders. After burning Sharath with the Metal Melting Machine in Victor's (Sharath's friend) factory, the Indian Union Minister requests Kenny to return to India as Shivakumar. However, Kenny rejects the request as his former identity as Shivakumar had "died" and he is going to spend his life for Meenakshi.

== Cast ==
- Vikram as Shivakumar/Kenny Thomas/Arjun Rathore/Imran
- Jagapathi Babu as Sharath Kumar
- Anushka Shetty as Meenakshi
- Amy Jackson as Miss London Sara Vinayagam
- Lakshmi Rai as Geetha
- Santhanam as Sathyan, the Tamil-speaking taxi driver
- Nassar as Veerakathi Pillai
- Saranya as Shivakumar's mother
- Sathish as Modelling Agent Bullappan
- Kota Srinivasa Rao as the Union Home Minister
- Sayaji Shinde as Ravi Chandran
- M. S. Bhaskar as Thambi Mama
- Thambi Ramaiah as Thappache Mama
- Delhi Ganesh as Meenakshi's father
- Rajie Vijay Sarathy as Meenakshi's mother
- Balaji Venugopal as Meenakshi's cousin
- Sujitha as Abi
- Daniel Kish as himself
- Alexx O'Nell as The Agent
- Raj Arjun as the real Kenny Thomas
- Subiksha Raman as Meera, Meenakshi's sister
- Daniel Jordan as Richard
- Mike Parish as Pastor

== Production ==
UTV Motion Pictures commenced an innovative title contest in Twitter, and it received massive response from Vikram fans. Vikram was revealed to play the role of a blind man, who practices the technique of human echolocation, the ability to detect objects, their position and size by sensing echoes. Vikram underwent special sessions with Daniel Kish, an internationally renowned expert of human echolocation. The team had planned to bring Kish to Chennai for the audio launch ceremony. Anushka was chosen to portray Vikram's wife in the film. Amy Jackson plays a British-born-Tamil girl in the film and was said to dub for herself as well. Telugu actor Jagapati Babu was selected to play villain.

=== Filming ===
Filming commenced in Chennai in early December 2011 and was to be held in various locations in the US for 60 days and later in Delhi and various locations across southern Tamil Nadu. Sources said that the film would be entirely shot in Los Angeles city. Almost 50 per cent of the shoot was completed with the Delhi and Chennai schedules. While "delays in getting the visa for the entire cast and crew" was the official reason given for the change of location from the US to the UK, sources told that the move was also necessitated to keep the budget from skyrocketing. Some scenes were shot in UK, including a song and dance scene shot at Botany Bay in Kent. Lakshmi Rai joined the team in London in April 2012. A duet song between Vikram and Amy was shot on the River Thames.

== Soundtrack ==
The soundtrack album was composed by G. V. Prakash Kumar, featuring lyrics written by Na. Muthukumar. It is the 25th album of the music director.

== Release ==
Thaandavam was produced on a budget of ₹400 million (US$4.2 million). The film helped raise ₹2 million (US$21,000) for the National Association of Blind (NAB) through its premiere show donor passes. The film released about 1000+ screens worldwide. The satellite rights of the film were sold to STAR Vijay. The film was later dubbed in Hindi under the title Desh Prem The Real Hero.

=== Critical reception ===
Thaandavam received mixed-to-positive reviews from critics. The Times of India rated the film 3/5, writing "Director Vijay and actor Vikram collaborate again in this movie after their earlier successful outing in Deiva Thirumagal, And Thaandavam'has everything going for it – big cast, good locations, a story with potential and a competent director – yet the result is far from satisfactory because of a weak and meandering screenplay, and poor pacing." Rediff's Pavithra Srinivasan wrote that the film was a "damp squib" and gave 2 out of 5 stars. Indiaglitz wrote: "Thaandavam has it's [sic] good sides and it's [sic] bad ones". Sify's reviewer claimed that it was "Vikram and him alone who diverts your attention from the film's little logical script flaws and spellbinds you with an endearing act that is Thaandavam's biggest strength". in.com's critic stated that it was a "neat revenge saga", further adding that it was "worth a watch for its neat screenplay and lavish production values", while giving it 3 out of 5. Prakash Upadhyaya of Oneindia.in gave 3/5 and wrote "Thaandavam is not glamorous but it is rich. It does not have masala elements yet it is entertaining". Tamilko wrote: "Thaandavam’s dreary screenplay hampers the much needed pace for a film set in espionage backdrop. Though Vikram greatly rescues the movie, the dull and predictable sequences doesn’t help Thaandavam’s course". The Hindu described it as a fiery dance of the righteous.

== Awards ==
Ceremony	Category	Nominee	Result
2nd South Indian International Movie Awards	Best Lyricist	Na. Muthukumar for "Oru Paathi"	Nominated
2nd South Indian International Movie Awards	Best Female Playback Singer	Saindhavi for "Uyirin Uyire"	Won
2nd South Indian International Movie Awards	Best Fight Choreographer	Manohar Varma	Nominated
