= Derren Brown Plays Russian Roulette Live =

2003 television special

- Brown, about to shoot chamber 6 at his head. The volunteer who loaded the gun watches behind bulletproof glass, wearing noise-cancelling headphones.
- Directed by: Stefan Stuckert; Tony Gregory
- Presented by: Derren Brown

Production
- Executive producer: Andrew O'Connor
- Producers: Debbie Young; Anthony Owen
- Running time: 50 minutes
- Production company: Objective Productions

Original release
- Network: Channel 4
- Release: 5 October 2003

Derren Brown Plays Russian Roulette Live was a 2003 television special in which the illusionist Derren Brown participated in a game of Russian roulette on live television. It was broadcast by Channel 4 to approximately 3 million viewers. During broadcast, the gun was presented as being loaded with a live round; it was actually loaded with a blank, though at such close range it would have killed him anyways.

== Background ==
Derren Brown is a British illusionist. Prior to the television special, he was responsible for the Channel 4 television series Derren Brown: Mind Control, in which he demonstrated the concepts of mind control and mind reading.

The programme Derren Brown Plays Russian Roulette Live was broadcast on 5 October 2003 by Channel 4. Total viewership was close to 3 million people.

== Synopsis ==
The first part of the program involved Brown selecting a volunteer who would load the gun. Brown made a group of 100 potential candidates partake in several games, eliminating contestants with each successive round, until one remained.

The volunteer then loaded a round into one of six numbered chambers of the Smith & Wesson revolver and returned it to Brown, and was asked to count upwards from one to six. Brown fired chambers 3 and 4 at his head, which were empty. He fired chamber 5 into a nearby haystack, which was also empty. Following a pause, he fired empty chamber 6 at his head, then the loaded chamber 1 into the environment. Brown appeared to have punctured a sandbag with this shot, with sand seen pouring out of it.

== Controversy ==
The show was criticised by psychiatrists as potentially promoting suicide, and concerns were raised over its scheduling immediately after a documentary on the suicide of a government official. Complaints were made in this regard to the Broadcasting Standards Commission, but Channel 4 were ultimately cleared of wrongdoing with the regulatory body finding a 15–minute delay on the broadcast would have prevented viewers from seeing Brown being harmed had he shot himself.

During the broadcast, the roulette game claimed to be filmed in a secret location with less restrictive gun laws than the United Kingdom's. However, filming took place on Francheville Farm in Grouville, Jersey, which has similar gun laws to the UK's. The States of Jersey Police later confirmed that no live rounds had been used on set; pyrotechnics were instead used to simulate the impact of a bullet on the sandbag and blank rounds were loaded into the revolver. Channel 4 marketing material had stated a "live bullet" would be used. Brown defended the use of blanks, a spokesperson arguing that "he would have died anyway" upon making a mistake.
