= World Access for the Blind =

International non-profit, non-governmental and educational organisation

- Founded: 28 September 2000
- Founder: Daniel Kish
- Type: Educational
- Purpose: Blindness; Quality of life
- Location: Placentia, California, U.S.
- Region served: Worldwide
- Method: Physical training; Human echolocation
- Revenue: $110,181 (2011)
- Website: www.worldaccessfortheblind.org

World Access for the Blind (WAFTB) is an international non-profit, non-governmental and educational organisation based in California, United States. The organisation was started to strengthen the physical, mental and personal development of people with all forms of blindness, and to increase public awareness about the strengths and capabilities of blind people. It was founded by Daniel Kish of Long Beach, California, in 2000. The primary work of the non-profit is to encourage and teach blind people the technique of echolocation for their movement, so as to minimise their inhibition with respect to people with normal sight. Their innovative training is called FlashSonar, which involves using sound for navigation. Their strategic campaigns are based on the philosophical stand: No Limits. The organisation participated in the medical study of human echolocation in 2011.

== Vision ==
World Access for the Blind tries to improve the quality of life such as in interaction between blind and sighted people by facilitating equal access to the world's resources and opportunities. It tries to promote and enhance self-recognition among the blind, and general acceptance in the normal society. It aims for productive participation and achievement to equal to that of sighted people. It tries to revolutionise the blind movement and promote learning of navigation based on knowledge of human perception, and a philosophy of No Limits.

== Achievements ==
Since its inception World Access for the Blind has helped over 7,000 students in over 30 countries. It organises workshops, presentations, and trainings. As of 2025, the activities span 41 countries. Volunteers and teachers give their services free of charge, but they are often sponsored by religious and relief organisations, schools and universities, medical institutions, nonprofit entities, media companies, professional organisations, corporations, and private parties. The organisation has successfully trained many blind and sighted students the technique of human echolocation called FlashSonar. By this technique people can navigate using tongue-clicking and responding to the reflected sound from their surrounding. In fact, using this technique, there are a number of successful solo, unguided hikes at the Grand Canyon, Death Valley, Mount Whitney, and the Appalachian Trail.

WAFTB was the consultant organisation in the scientific study of the neural basis of human echolocation at the University of Western Ontario in 2011.
