= Sacrifice (TV program) =

- Written by: Derren Brown; Andrew O'Connor; Ian Sharkey; Stephen Long
- Directed by: John Pereira
- Presented by: Derren Brown
- Composer: Nick Foster
- Countries of origin: United Kingdom; United States
- Original language: English
- No. of episodes: 1

Production
- Executive producers: Derren Brown; Andrew O'Connor
- Producers: Ben Jessop, Paul Cornwell
- Running time: 49 minutes

Original release
- Network: Netflix
- Release: 19 October 2018

Sacrifice is a 2018 Netflix special by Derren Brown. The special features an unsuspecting participant, Phil, taking part in a faked medical experiment to increase his bravery and empathy before he is put in a situation where he must decide whether to take a bullet for a stranger or save his own life.

Premiering on 19 October 2018, Sacrifice was the first of Brown's specials made exclusively for Netflix. The show received mixed reviews, with criticism of the ethics of manipulating the participant.

== Synopsis ==
The American subject Phil is recruited for the show because of his strong opinions that illegal immigrants are a threat to America. Phil is told that he is taking part in a medical experiment in the UK, which Derren Brown has helped develop. Phil has a chip implanted in his neck and must use a meditation app Turbine daily. The app encourages him to be decisive, with its distinctive noise acting as a trigger. After Phil uses the app for a while, Brown meets with him and uses psychological techniques to make his left hand feel numb. At Brown's direction, he pushes a needle through the skin on the back of his hand.

Phil is next asked to jump off a cliff into water, despite his fear of both heights and open water. At Brown's encouragement, and use of the Turbine app noise, Phil is able to stand at the edge of the platform, but after two attempts is still unable to jump. Brown next brings Phil in for the results of a DNA test—Phil is surprised to find that little of it is from the UK or America. Brown then gets Phil to stare into the eyes of a stranger of another race for four minutes. He tears up and asks the stranger for a hug.

Phil is told that the experiment has ended and resumes his life in America. Phil flies to Los Angeles and takes a cab to meet his friend, who has told him that he has a free trip to Las Vegas. The driver is an actor. Upon the pretence of the car breaking down, Phil is taken to a bar filled with a biker gang played by actors. One member comes up to Phil and starts a conversation. The driver leaves and pretends to be at a mechanic, saying that Phil needs to take a taxi down there. The biker offers Phil a ride.

Two men enter the bar and are forcefully ushered out by members of the gang, who claim Mexicans are not allowed at the bar. As Phil gets into their truck, the bikers spot the men knocking their bikes over. They chase after them and Phil is told to stay in the car while the bikers deal with the situation. They restrain the two men and force them to admit that they are illegal immigrants. A biker pulls out a gun. At this moment, the radio in the car plays the Turbine app's tone and Phil steps out of the car. He stands in front of the Mexican who the gun is aimed at and pleads with the biker. The biker issues an ultimatum, saying that there is one bullet in the gun and it is for Phil or the Mexican. He counts down from five, offering Phil the chance to move out of the way. Phil continues pleading with the biker to the very last second and the biker shoots Phil.

The bullet is a fake and Brown steps in to explain to Phil that the events were staged.

== Production ==
Sacrifice was the first special by Brown which was produced solely for online streaming platform Netflix. Previously Brown's specials were shown on the UK Channel 4, and his works Miracle and Pushed to the Edge were broadcast on both Channel 4 and Netflix. Sacrifice was designed to be lighter in tone than Pushed to the Edge, with an "ultimately humanitarian message". A trailer for the special was released on 10 October 2018. The special was released on 19 October.

Following the show's filming, Brown introduced Phil to Steven and Chris, the subjects of his previous specials Apocalypse and Pushed to the Edge, so that Phil would have "a network of people who’d shared a similar experience". Brown reported that the experience was "transformative" for Phil, with whom his contact was continuing, as "after care is an important part of [the show]".

== Analysis ==
Amy Glynn of Paste discusses the idea that "reality is a collage of illusions", linking Brown's experiment with numbing Phil's hand to examples of powerful placebo effects. Glynn opines that the show evidences that beliefs change through discovering one's own capability.

Angelica Florio of Bustle describes Phil's initial views as "racist" and compares them to Donald Trump's statements about Mexican immigrants during his 2016 presidential campaign. Florio describes Phil's views as "problematic" despite his lack of intent to harm anyone. Brown said that he endeavoured to "avoid anything overtly political" in the special, personally opining that "truth and humanity lies" between left-wing and right-wing discourse.

Glynn notes that the show raises many questions about personal narratives, the effect of fear, and empathy. Brown says that the show is "about stepping out of the narratives we live by", such as moral and political narratives.

== Reception ==
Sacrifice received mixed reviews. Fiona Sturges of The Guardian takes issue at the way Phil is treated by Brown as a "guinea pig". Josh Sorokach of Decider similarly objects to Brown's manipulation of Phil, and Tilly Pearce of Metro describes the show as inhabiting "an emotional grey area".

Sturges gives the show an overwhelmingly negative review, saying that Brown has "restyled himself as an all-powerful, egocentric sage". Criticising Brown's "God complex", Sturges writes that his monologues make him sound like a "sanctimonious knobhead". Sorokach describes the show as "an unsettling psychological experiment you'll either love or hate". Sorokach believes that the tone is "more cringe-inducing than uplifting" and says Brown is "more concerned about vanity than [...] innovation".

However, the special has received positive commentary. Pearce gives the episode a five star rating, praising Brown's "amazing deal of empathy". Pearce compliments the "nerve-wracking" climax and the moral conclusion. Glynn describes the special as "bizarrely gripping" despite being ethically questionable. Florio praises that it "tackles one of the most prominent racial divides in the country head-on".
