= Andrew Hugill =

Andrew Hugill (born 1957) is a British composer, writer and academic. He is a former professor of music and professor of creative computing, and previously directed the Creative Computing programme at University of Leicester until his retirement in 2024. His creative and research output spans music composition, digital technology, literature, and disability advocacy, focusing on neurodivergence and the concept of aural diversity. As a composer, he founded the post-minimalist ensemble George W. Welch, and his publications include academic monographs such as The Digital Musician and 'Pataphysics: A Useless Guide.

== Biography ==
Andrew Hugill studied composition with Roger Marsh at the University of Keele between 1976 and 1980, and in 1983 he founded the ensemble "George W. Welch". He began lecturing at Leicester Polytechnic in 1986, working alongside Gavin Bryars and Dave Smith, eventually becoming subject-leader for the BA Performing Arts: Music. He taught composition, performance and music history.

He founded the Music, Technology and Innovation programme in 1997 at De Montfort University and taught Creative and Negotiated Projects, Musicianship and Internet Music.

In 2006 he founded the Institute of Creative Technologies and was its director until 2012.

In 2013, he set up Creative Computing at Bath Spa University.

In 2018, he founded the Creative Computing programme at University of Leicester, where he served as director until his retirement in 2024.

Hugill is a Principal Fellow and a National Teaching Fellow of the Higher Education Academy.

Hugill has had a huge impact on the views of Aural Diversity.

== Compositions ==
Hugill's compositions include music for solo instruments and ensembles, orchestral music, and electronic and digital music.

- Simon and Ennoia (1987) for ensemble of violin, viola, cello, vibraphone and marimba
- Catalogue de Grenouilles (1988) for massed frog recordings and human musicians
- Brisset Rhymes (1990) for soprano, pre-recorded sound, oud, lute, Renaissance guitar, hurdy-gurdy, and percussion
- O Pax Aetherna (1994) for four or more pianos
- Bride, Teeming With Sweet To The Bridegroom (1995) for piano solo
- Nocturne (1995) for two pianos and percussion (commissioned by BBC Radio 3)
- Island Symphony (1995) an electroacoustic and subsequent orchestral work inspired by St. George's Island
- Symphony for Cornwall (1999) electroacoustic composition for orchestra
- Fête donné par un 'pataphysicien anglais (2000) for piano solo
- Sonneries Parfumées (2000) for piano solo
- Pianolith (2003) the internet music project
- Digestif (2008) for piano solo

== Awards and honours ==
In 2004, Hugill was nominated for the BT Digital Music Awards for The Sound Exchange, his internet-based collaborative project with the Philharmonia Orchestra.

In 2006, the Times Higher Education Awards highly commended Hugill for the "Most Imaginative Use of Distance Learning".

== Research and publications ==
Hugill's research is transdisciplinary and covers literature, music and computer science. He has published articles on aspects of surrealism in literature, digital music, and software engineering.

In 2008, Hugill published the book The Digital Musician in which he identifies the possibilities and challenges new technologies offer the modern musician. A second, updated edition was published as an e-book in 2012. A third edition was published in 2018.

In 2012, he published 'Pataphysics: A Useless Guide, the first complete history of the subject in English.

== Pataphysics ==
Hugill is an active researcher in 'pataphysics and a member of the Collège de 'Pataphysique, where he was awarded the Ordre de la Grande Guidouille and the rank of Commandeur Requis. He is the curator of the CD Pataphysics, a history of 'Pataphysics in sound.
