= Perception (video game) =

2017 video game

- Developer: The Deep End Games
- Publishers: The Deep End Games; Feardemic
- Director: Bill Gardner
- Producer: Amanda Gardner
- Writer: Amanda Gardner
- Composer: Jim Bonney
- Engine: Unreal Engine 4
- Platforms: Microsoft Windows; Nintendo Switch; PlayStation 4; Xbox One
- Release: Microsoft Windows; May 30, 2017; PlayStation 4, Xbox One; June 6, 2017; Nintendo Switch; October 31, 2017
- Genre: Adventure
- Mode: Single-player

Perception (Note: The title is often shown along with Braille writing: ⠏⠑⠗⠉⠑⠏⠞⠊⠕⠝) is a 2017 first-person horror-themed adventure video game developed by The Deep End Games and published by The Deep End Games and Feardemic. It was released for Microsoft Windows on May 30, 2017, followed by the PlayStation 4 and Xbox One versions on June 6, and by the Nintendo Switch version on October 31. The story follows Cassie Thornton, a blind woman who perceives the world using echolocation. The player assumes the role of Cassie and must use her unique skill to explore a large mansion in Gloucester, Massachusetts and uncover its secrets.

The development team behind Perception consists of several former Irrational Games employees that had worked on BioShock (2007) and BioShock Infinite (2013).

== Gameplay ==
The ringing of a grandfather clock makes the environment visible due to Cassie's echolocation.

Perception is a first-person horror-themed adventure video game in which the player assumes the role of Cassie Thornton, a blind woman who navigates a mansion through means of echolocation. This skill allows sounds such as Cassie's footsteps, dripping water, or flowing wind allow the player to catch a glimpse of their surroundings. Through use of echolocation, the player must explore the environment to examine objects and unravel the game's story. The player also has a cane which they can tap to provide a complete view of any given room. If the player taps too much, the game's antagonist haunting the establishment, known as the Presence, may kill them. The Presence cannot be killed directly, and has been compared to the enemies in other horror games such as Amnesia: The Dark Descent (2010), Outlast (2013) and Alien: Isolation (2014). Cassie also has a cell phone which the player can use to send pictures and text to an operator who can describe the content to them.

== Development ==
Perception was developed by The Deep End Games, a Boston-based development studio founded by Bill Gardner. Gardner had previously worked for Irrational Games where he had worked on BioShock and BioShock Infinite. The studio consists of several other former Irrational Games employees that had also worked on the BioShock series, and also Gardner's wife serves as writer and producer. Development had been under way on Perception for around six months and was being self-funded by Gardner before the team launched a Kickstarter crowdfunding campaign in May 2015 requesting US$150,000. The campaign concluded successfully a month later with $168,041 raised towards the game's remaining development.

Perception is set in Gloucester, Massachusetts. Gardner explained that he drew from New England's reputation for being a reoccurring setting in horror fiction, such as in Lovecraft stories. He also described the architecture of the estate in the game to resemble that of architecture in the region.

== Release ==
Perception was released for Microsoft Windows on May 30, 2017. The PlayStation 4 and Xbox One versions followed on June 6, 2017. The game was published by The Deep End Games and Feardemic, an independent publisher in Kraków, Poland.

On October 31, 2017, the Nintendo Switch version was released; on the same date, the game received a "Remaster Update" that added new difficulty modes and script changes.

== Reception ==
Reception

Aggregate score
| Aggregator | Score |
|---|---|
| Metacritic | (PC) 56/100 (PS4) 56/100 (XONE) 61/100 |

Review scores
| Publication | Score |
|---|---|
| Destructoid | 3/10 |
| Game Informer | 8.25/10 |
| GameSpot | 5/10 |
| IGN | 4.8/10 |
| PC Gamer (US) | 50/100 |
| Polygon | 6.5/10 |
| VideoGamer.com | 6/10 |

Perception received "mixed or average" reviews, according to review aggregator website Metacritic. The game was nominated for "Most Fulfilling Community-Funded Game" at the 2018 SXSW Gaming Awards.
