= Ken Bolam =

- Born: United Kingdom
- Occupations: Composer, producer
- Years active: 1987–present

Ken Bolam is a British film and TV composer and producer, who has worked extensively over the past twenty years. He is best known for his work on popular TV shows such as Ready Steady Cook (BBCTV), Derren Brown - The Events (Channel Four), and The Cube (ITV1), as well as on the BAFTA award-winning Jim Henson TV series The Hoobs. Recent work includes many credits for TV shows written together with Nick Foster.

== Career ==
Born in Sunderland, Tyne and Wear, he played the North East circuit in the 70s as a singer-songwriter, before moving to London to teach Drama in the East End, going on to compose music for theatre, film and TV.

In 1994 he teamed up with Initial Film and Television (part of Endemol UK) as Music Supervisor, Associate Producer and Executive Producer, working on numerous projects including The White Room (Channel Four), Club Class (Channel Five), and Roll With It (Flextech).

He was instrumental in the setting up of Initial Kids and the production of Miami 7 (BBC), Cleopatra's Comin' Atcha, and Wild Track for ITV. He then headed up Global Talent TV with Chris Cowey, executive-producing Urbanation (Nation 277/Sky TV) and G4 at the Royal Albert Hall (DVD Sony Music). He was also responsible for brokering music publishing administration deals for Endemol, Initial, Zeal, and Whizzkid Entertainment. He is currently working on a number of projects with Nick Foster, one of which is the development of HomeMade Music.

== Notable Work ==
=== TV ===
Bolam composed the theme tune for UK TV shows Ready Steady Cook, The Brit Awards, BrainTeaser, Can’t Cook Won’t Cook, and recently The Cube, Derren Brown - The Events and Let’s Dance for Comic Relief, co-written with Nick Foster. Ken worked extensively in the field of children's TV, working on long-running big-audience shows such as Dizzy Heights, Tricky Business, and Dooby Duck. He also composed over 200 songs and wrote the incidental music (excluding the theme tune which was written by Ed Welch) for the BAFTA award-winning series The Hoobs (Jim Henson/Channel Four) and wrote the incidental music for the groundbreaking Children's BBC series Miami 7 which was sold to over 100 countries around the world.

=== Film ===
Film composer credits include Lost Dogs (2005) and Flirting With Flamenco (2006) (both directed by Jim Doyle for Optimist Films). He was Music Supervisor for both Eric Fellner and Eileen Quinn at Initial Films on the Helen Mirren film The Hawk (1993), and on Seaforth (starring Lia Williams), The Wexford Trilogy by Billy Roche (all for BBC) and No Worries (starring Geraldine James) for Film4.

=== Musical Theatre ===
- Rockafella (Published by Samuel French)
- The Frankenstein Monster Show (Samuel French)
- United We Stand (Samuel French)

=== Other ===
Ken has also been active in the field of children's educational materials, having devised, written, and produced over 50 children's learning CDs for CYP Music, and also published several educational folk song collections through Faber Music.
