= Human echolocation =

Human ability to detect surroundings using sounds

Human echolocation is the ability of humans to detect objects in their environment by sensing echoes from those objects, by actively creating sounds: for example, by tapping their canes, lightly stomping their foot, clapping their hands, snapping their fingers, or making clicking noises with their mouths.

People trained to orient by echolocation can interpret the sound waves reflected by nearby objects, accurately identifying their location, size and density. That is, the echoes allow detailed information about the object's location (where it is), dimension (size and shape), and density (solidity) to be identified. For example, they provide information about the location and nature of objects and their environment, such as walls, doorways, recesses, overhangs, pillars, ascending curbs and steps, fire hydrants, pedestrians, parked or moving vehicles, trees and other foliage. Some of them can perform tricks such as running, basketball, rollerblading, football and skateboarding, and can safely navigate wilderness areas by hiking or mountain biking.

== Overview ==
Many blind individuals passively use natural environmental echoes to sense details about their environment (passive echolocation); however, others actively produce mouth clicks (palatal click) and are able to gauge information about their environment using the echoes from those clicks (active echolocation). Both passive and active echolocation help blind individuals sense their environments.

Those who can see their environments often do not readily perceive echoes from nearby objects, due to an echo suppression phenomenon brought on by the precedence effect. However, with training, sighted individuals with normal hearing can learn to avoid obstacles using only sound, showing that echolocation is a general human ability. John Levack Drever refers to echolocation in humans an example of panacusi loci, spatial hearing that exceeds the prescribed normative mode.

== Discrimination ability ==
Echoes and other sounds can convey spatial data that are comparable in many respects to those conveyed by light. A blind traveler using echoes can perceive very complex, detailed, and specific features of the world from distances far beyond physical reach. Echoes can make information available about the nature and arrangement of objects and environmental features such as walls, doorways, recesses, overhangs, pillars, ascending curbs and steps, fire hydrants, pedestrians, parked or moving vehicles, trees and other foliage, and much more. Echoes can give detailed information about location (where objects are), dimension (how big they are and their general shape), and density (how solid they are). Location is generally broken down into distance from the observer and direction (left/right, front/back, high/low). Dimension refers to the object's height (tall or short) and breadth (wide or narrow).

By understanding the interrelationships of these qualities, much can be perceived about the nature of an object or multiple objects. For example, an object that is tall and narrow may be recognized quickly as a pole. An object that is tall and narrow near the bottom while broad near the top would be a tree. Something that is tall and very broad registers as a wall or building. Something that is broad and tall in the middle, while being shorter at either end may be identified as a parked car. An object that is low and broad may be a planter, retaining wall, or curb. And finally, something that starts out close and very low but recedes into the distance as it gets higher is a set of steps.

Density refers to the solidity of the object (solid/sparse, hard/soft). Awareness of density adds richness and complexity to one's available information. For instance, an object that is low and solid may be recognized as a table, while something low and sparse sounds like a bush; but an object that is tall and broad and very sparse is probably a fence.

== Mechanism ==
Vision and hearing are akin in that each entails detection of reflected waves of energy. Vision processes light waves that travel from their source, bounce off surfaces throughout the environment and enter the eyes. Similarly, the auditory system processes sound waves as they travel from their source, bounce off surfaces and enter the ears. Both neural systems can extract a great deal of information about the environment by interpreting the complex patterns of reflected energy that their sense organs receive. In the case of sound these waves of reflected energy are referred to as echoes.

=== Brain areas associated with echolocation ===
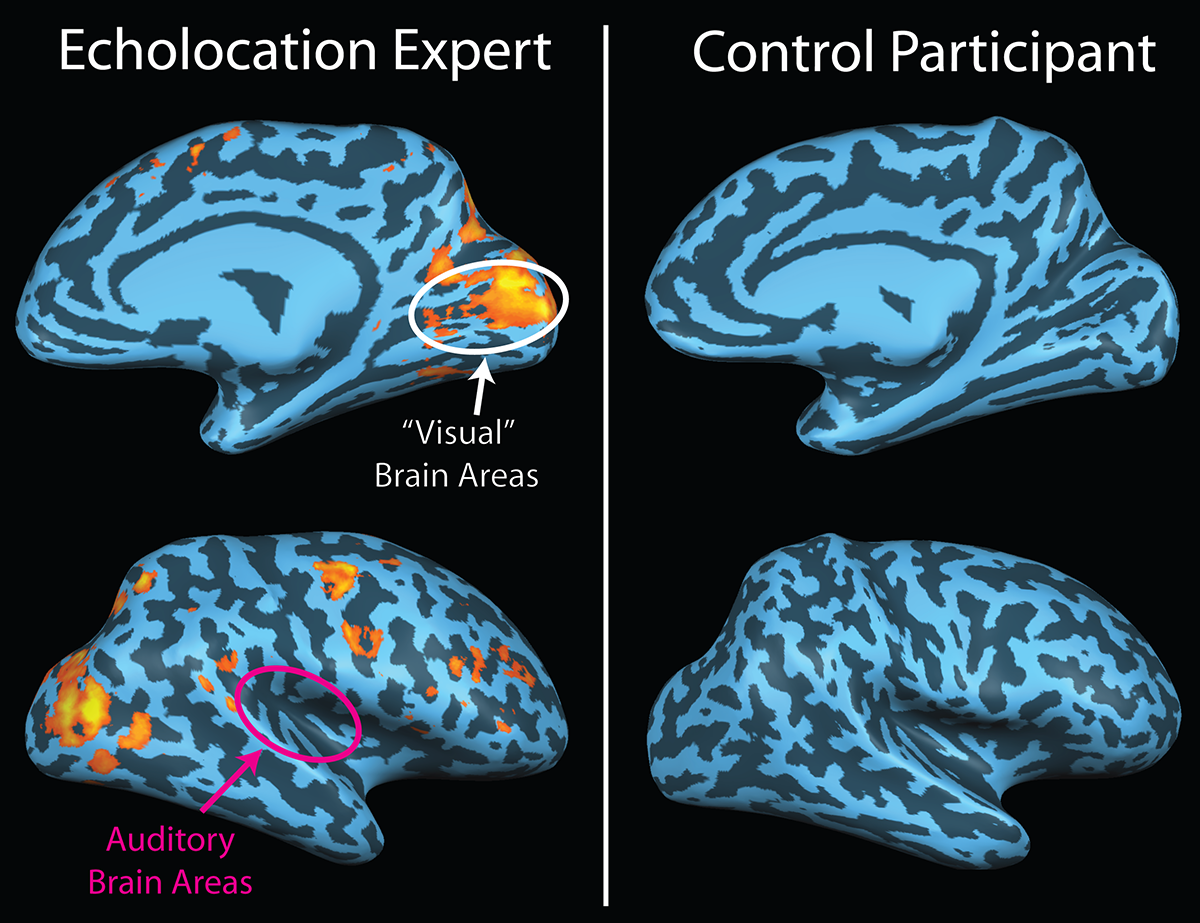
Echo-related activity in the brain of an early-blind, trained echolocator is shown on the left. There is no activity evident in the brain of a sighted person not so trained (shown on the right) listening to the same echoes

Some blind people are skilled at echolocating silent objects simply by producing mouth clicks and listening to the returning echoes. Although few studies have been performed on the neural basis of human echolocation, those studies report activation of primary visual cortex during echolocation in blind expert echolocators. The driving mechanism of this brain region remapping phenomenon is known as neuroplasticity.

In a 2014 study by Thaler and colleagues, the researchers first made recordings of the clicks and their very faint echoes using tiny microphones placed in the ears of the blind echolocators as they stood outside and tried to identify different objects such as a car, a flag pole, and a tree. The researchers then played the recorded sounds back to the echolocators while their brain activity was being measured using functional magnetic resonance imaging. Remarkably, when the echolocation recordings were played back to the blind experts, not only did they perceive the objects based on the echoes, but they also showed activity in those areas of their brain that normally process visual information in sighted people, primarily the primary visual cortex or V1. This result is surprising, as visual areas are normally only active during visual tasks. The brain areas that process auditory information were no more activated by sound recordings of outdoor scenes containing echoes than they were by sound recordings of outdoor scenes with the echoes removed. Importantly, when the same experiment was carried out with sighted people who did not echolocate, these individuals could not perceive the objects and there was no echo-related activity anywhere in the brain. This suggests that the cortex of blind echolocators is plastic and reorganizes such that primary visual cortex, rather than any auditory area, becomes involved in the computation of echolocation tasks.

Despite this evidence, the extent to which activation in the visual cortex in blind echolocators contributes to echolocation abilities is unclear. As previously mentioned, sighted individuals have the ability to echolocate; however, they do not show comparable activation in visual cortex. This would suggest that sighted individuals use areas beyond visual cortex for echolocation.

== Background ==
The term "echolocation" was coined by zoologist Donald Griffin in 1944. But the phenomenon was known about earlier, for example, Denis Diderot reported in 1749 that blind people could locate silent objects. Human echolocation has been known and formally studied since at least the 1950s. The field of human and animal echolocation was surveyed in book form as early as 1959 (see also White, et al. (1970)).

In earlier times, human echolocation was sometimes described as "facial vision" or "obstacle sense", as it was believed that the proximity of nearby objects caused pressure changes on the skin. Only in the 1940s did a series of experiments performed in the Cornell Psychological Laboratory show that sound and hearing, rather than pressure changes on the skin, were the mechanisms driving this ability.

== Notable cases ==
=== Daniel Kish ===
Echolocation was further developed by Daniel Kish, who works with the blind through the non-profit organization World Access for the Blind. He leads blind teenagers hiking and mountain-biking through the wilderness, and teaches them how to navigate new locations safely, with a technique that he calls "FlashSonar". Kish had his eyes removed at the age of 13 months due to retinal cancer. He learned to make palatal clicks with his tongue when he was still a child, and now trains other blind people in the use of echolocation and in what he calls "Perceptual Mobility". Though at first resistant to using a cane for mobility, seeing it as a "handicapped" device, and considering himself "not handicapped at all", Kish developed a technique using his white cane combined with echolocation to further expand his mobility.

Kish reports that "The sense of imagery is very rich for an experienced user. One can get a sense of beauty or starkness or whatever—from sound as well as echo." He is able to distinguish a metal fence from a wooden one by the information returned by the echoes on the arrangement of the fence structures; in extremely quiet conditions, he can also hear the warmer and duller quality of the echoes from wood compared to metal.

=== Thomas Tajo ===
Thomas Tajo was born in the remote Himalayan village of Chayangtajo in the state of Arunachal Pradesh in the north-east India. He became blind around the age of 7 or 8 due to optic nerve atrophy and taught himself to echolocate. Today he lives in Belgium and works with Visioneers or World Access to impart independent navigational skills to blind individuals across the world. Tajo is also an independent researcher. He researches the cultural and biological evolutionary history of the senses and presents his findings to scientific conferences around the world.

=== Ben Underwood ===
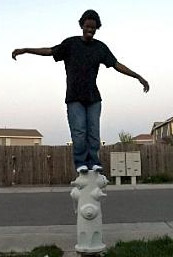
Ben Underwood

Ben Underwood was born on January 26, 1992, in Riverside, California. He was diagnosed with retinal cancer at the age of two, and had his eyes removed at the age of three.

He taught himself echolocation at the age of five, becoming able to detect the location of objects by making frequent clicking noises with his tongue. This case was explained in 20/20: Medical Mysteries. He used it to accomplish feats such as running, playing basketball, riding a bicycle, rollerblading, playing football, and skateboarding. Underwood's childhood eye doctor claimed that Underwood was one of the most proficient human echolocators.

Underwood died of cancer in 2009.

=== Lawrence Scadden ===
Lawrence Scadden lost his sight as a child due to illness, but learned to use echolocation well enough to ride a bicycle in traffic. (His parents thought that he still had some sight remaining.) In 1998, he was interviewed at the Auditory Neuroethology Laboratory at the University of Maryland about his experience with echolocation. The researchers were aware of the Wiederorientierung phenomenon described by Griffin where bats, despite continuing to emit echolocation calls, use path integration in familiar acoustic space. Scadden said he did the same, as echolocation required extra effort.

The National Science Teachers Association created the "Lawrence A. Scadden Outstanding Teacher Award of the Year for Students With Disabilities" in his honor.

=== Lucas Murray ===
Lucas Murray, from Poole, Dorset, was born blind, and is one of the first British people to have learned human echolocation, having learned it from Daniel Kish. Lucas' parents saw a documentary about Daniel Kish teaching Ben Underwood echolocation. Months later, they learned that Daniel would be visiting a Scottish charity called Visibility and contacted him. Kish taught the five-year-old Lucas the basics of echolocation over four days. By age seven, Lucas was proficient enough to not only accurately tell the distance of objects, but also their material, and could play with other children in sports such as rock climbing and basketball. In 2019, he enjoyed a week's work experience with South Western Railway.

=== Kevin Warwick ===
The scientist Kevin Warwick experimented with feeding ultrasonic pulses into the brain (via electrical stimulation from a neural implant) as an additional sensory input. In tests he was able to discern distance to objects accurately and to detect small movements of those objects.

=== Juan Ruiz ===
Blind from birth, Juan Ruiz lives in Los Angeles, California. He appeared in the first episode of Stan Lee's Superhumans, titled "Electro Man". The episode showed him capable of riding a bicycle, avoiding parked cars and other obstacles, and identifying nearby objects. He entered and exited a cave, where he determined its length and other features.

== In popular media ==
The 1964 Marvel Comics character Daredevil is a superhero who uses his heightened senses paired with echolocation to perceive the world in extraordinary detail.

In the 2007 children's fantasy novel Gregor and the Code of Claw, protagonist Gregor learns echolocation. This skill proves useful for fighting in the Underland, an underground civilization which is the main setting of the book.

In the 2012 film Imagine, the main character teaches echolocation to students at a clinic for the visually impaired. This unconventional method spurs a controversy but helps students explore the world.

The 2017 video game Perception places the player in the role of a blind woman who must use echolocation to navigate the environment.

== See also ==
- Acoustic location
- Binaural recording
- Aural diversity
- Sensory substitution
- Thaandavam - A Tamil film involving human echolocation

== Bibliography ==
- "Humans With Amazing Senses". ABC News. 2006-08-08.
- "Blind boy uses his ears to 'see'". BBC News. 2009-10-05.
- Griffin, Donald R. (1959). Echoes of Bats and Men. Science and Study Series. Seeing With Sound Waves. Garden City, New York: Anchor Books. LCCN 59-12051.
- Hutchinson, Alex (June 2012). "Bat Man". Western University. The Brain and Mind Institute. Archived from the original on 2014-03-15. - Featured in Reader's Digest.
- Irvine, Chris (2009-10-05). "Seven year old blind boy uses echoes to see". The Daily Telegraph. London.
- Joseph, Emma (2009-10-07). "Lucas learns echo technique to 'see'". Daily Echo. Newsquest Media Group Ltd.
- Kish, Daniel (1995). Evaluation of an Echo-Mobility Program for Young Blind People. 277p. (Master's thesis). San Bernardino, CA: Department of Psychology, California State University. Archived from the original on 2002-02-02.
- Kremer, William (2012-09-12). "Human echolocation: Using tongue-clicks to navigate the world". BBC News.
- Moorhead, Joanna (2007-01-27). "Seeing with sound". The Guardian. London.
- Schorn, Daniel (2006-07-19). "How A Blind Teen 'Sees' With Sound". CBS News.
- Thaler, Lore; Goodale, Melvyn A. (2016). "Echolocation in humans: an overview". Wiley Interdisciplinary Reviews. Cognitive Science. 7 (6): 382–393. doi:10.1002/wcs.1408. ISSN 1939-5086. PMID 27538733.
- Warwick, K.; Hutt, B.; Gasson, M.; Goodhew, I. (October 2005), "An attempt to extend human sensory capabilities by means of implant technology", Proc. IEEE International Conference on Systems, Man, and Cybernetics - Hawaii, pp. 1663–1668
