= Joe Power (psychic) =

Claimed psychic medium

- Born: September 24, 1966 (age 60); Liverpool, England, United Kingdom
- Occupation: Medium

Joe Power is a British author and television and stage performer who claims to mediate communication between spirits of the dead and living human beings. He appeared as the subject of "The Man Who Contacts the Dead", an episode of Derren Brown Investigates first broadcast in the UK by Channel 4 in 2010. In the show he left Brown with the impression that he was a charlatan, capitalising on people’s grief.

== Career ==
Power has been active as a stage performer of mediumship since 2004, touring around the UK and Ireland. He also offers one-to-one sessions, readings and courses claimed to aid development and training in psychic powers.

In May 2009, Penguin published The Man Who Sees Dead People, Power's autobiographical account detailing his early life with his claimed psychic abilities and his brother's murder.

=== 2010 Derren Brown Investigates appearance ===
Power appeared as the main subject in the first episode of the first series of the Channel 4 show Derren Brown Investigates, in which Brown investigated his claimed psychic abilities through rewatching his live stage events, sitting in on celebrity readings and organising independent private readings.

One such reading was with Hollyoaks actress Claire Cooper, during which Power asked if Cooper drove a Mini, which she confirmed. However, in Power and Brown's final talk, Brown stated that one of his crew saw Cooper pull up in her car next to Power.

Another feature of the show involved Brown setting up a reading with a non-skeptic, named Ros, but giving her the fake name of 'Pam' and asking Power to meet her in a house that was not her own, supposedly to test Power's psychic abilities by reducing the amount of research he could do beforehand. This reading was shown as being poor in comparison to other readings Power had done earlier in the show. Again, Power alleged that Brown and Objective Productions had acted unfairly towards him, as Brown had met Ros before Power himself had met her, despite what he said he understood to be a statement that she hadn't met Brown, despite Brown having earlier told him, on camera, that he had visited earlier that morning. In addition, it was revealed that the subject of the earlier reading, where Power had appeared to divine many facts about the subject, was in fact the next door neighbour of Power's sister.

Power later filed a complaint with Ofcom. He told the Liverpool Echo: "Originally I was told the programme was going to be called Derren Brown Unexplained and I thought it would be fair... But I was made to feel uncomfortable from the start. I felt like it was an interrogation. The edited version showed me being abusive, but I wasn't, I was just very annoyed at what they were doing." Ofcom dismissed the complaint.
