= Aural diversity =

Diversity in the sense of hearing

Aural Diversity describes the plurality of the sense of hearing, encompassing the whole of human and animal nature and extending to machine listening. The Aural Diversity Infographic shows its scope, including: the many changes in so-called “normal” hearing that occur over a lifetime; the universal variations that affect everybody's hearing; the medically identifiable hearing conditions of roughly one sixth of the world's population; and an array of technologies that mediate hearing, such as hearing aids, prosthetics (e.g. cochlear implants, auditory brainstem implants, middle ear implants and bone conduction implants), and all kinds of hearable devices.

An important feature of Aural Diversity is the recognition that it includes not only the many forms of hearing loss, but also an increased sensitivity to sound in conditions such as auditory processing disorder, auditory neuropathy spectrum disorder, tinnitus, hyperacusis, misophonia and various types of neurodivergence. The ways in which sound may be heard, processed and understood vary greatly. Existing standards articulate a notion of “otological normalcy” based on the hearing of healthy 18-25 year-olds (who represent roughly 17% of the population). Aural Diversity therefore challenges the tacit assumptions that underpin disciplines ranging from auditory science and acoustics to audiology and acoustical engineering, from architecture and design to music and psychology.

The study of Aural Diversity focuses on these differences and their implications for any situation involving sound. It is therefore characterized by its transdisciplinarity, welcoming not only traditional academic papers, but also sharing of lived experience and the creation of artworks that are regarded as equally important to increasing scientific understanding and social acceptance. In general, it avoids terms like “impairment”, “deficit”, and “loss”, preferring instead more neutral words such as “difference”. There is an overlap with Disability Studies and with Deaf culture, but the scope of Aural Diversity concerns itself with the full spectrum of hearing difference.

== History ==
“Auraldiversity”, consciously echoing neurodiversity, was coined by Prof. John Levack Drever, who first presented the term and concept at Hearing Landscape Critically, Harvard University, in 2015. The term arose from the findings of his study of the noise impact of high-speed hand dryers and the inadequacy of policy and guidance of acoustics. He subsequently applied the term to sonic art and sound art practice. The Aural Diversity Project was founded in 2018 by Andrew Hugill with funding from GNResound Ltd and Arts Council England. It has staged several academic conferences and some innovative concerts which combined aurally divergent musicians and audiences to explore new ways of listening. The Aural Diversity Network, funded by the UK Arts and Humanities Research Council, was established in 2021. The book Aural Diversity, co-edited by Drever and Hugill, was published in 2022. In 2024, the development consultancy Arup Acoustics published their Aural Diversity Toolkit in consultation with the network and the Welsh Government included Aural Diversity in their “Noise and Soundscape Plan for Wales 2023-2028”. The Leverhulme Trust Aural Diversity Doctoral Research Hub (LAURA) was established in 2024 with a £2.2 million award at the University of Salford and Goldsmiths, University of London, though Goldsmiths had to drop out as a result of academic lay-offs in Summer 2024.
