= Unconscious fraud =

Fraud committed by an unwitting perpetrator

Unconscious fraud is fraud committed by somebody who does not consciously realise that they are deceiving others. Examples could be a hypnotised person or perhaps a medium in a trance, neither of whom would consciously realise that they are engaging in acts which make others believe – such as that a 'spirit' has moved an object.

== Difference between conscious and unconscious fraud ==
It is extremely essential to distinguish between conscious and unconscious fraud as one easily coheres with the other. Fraudulent money procured by the acts of automatism when the victim is in a state of trance falls under the heading of unconscious fraud. Automatism can be practised on a victim in varying degrees. In more pronounced cases, the victim is entirely unaware of what he/she is doing and has entered a state of complete trance. In such an instance, he/she can be pardoned. However, in a minimal or lesser degree of trance, the victim may be initially conscious or partly conscious and gradually enters a state of complete trance. In the latter case, he can be partly accused for the fraud committed. On the other end, when a person is conscious and not under a state of hypnotism or any other medium of trance, the fraud he/she commits is termed as conscious. It is punishable by the law.

== Types of unconscious fraud ==
=== Through self practised clairvoyance ===
Devious clairvoyants can extract information from their customers through muscle reading or by 'judicious enquiry' of the client's past and present. This information can then be used for fraudulent means. As the client would be unaware of this fraud committed in his name, it can be put under unconscious fraud.

=== Through automatism ===
Automatism has precisely been defined as,"An involuntary act such as sleepwalking that has been performed in a state of unconsciousness. The subject does not act voluntarily and is not fully aware of his or her actions".

- Hypnotism: Under hypnosis, a person is said to have elevated concentration on a particular thought or event barring the sources of distraction. Due to this, a person can be compelled to perform an act of desire. Therefore, hypnotism can enable a person to commit a fraud he or she is unaware of.
- Somnambulism (sleepwalking): Occurs when the person carries out all the routine activities like cooking, getting up from bed walking and so on and so forth in a state of sleep.= In such a state where the conscious mind is not functioning, there is a possibility that the victim may commit a crime or a fraud he would entirely be unaware of when conscious.
- Concussion or minor head trauma: A head injury with a temporary loss of brain function. Its prominent symptoms include post-traumatic amnesia and loss of consciousness. Under this state, the deceitful act committed by the victim would be unconscious fraud.

=== Through Illusions ===
Time and again, fraud is committed by deceiving people through optical and other illusions. Skilled techniques using a sleight of hand, thread or hair to move objects or hoax spirit photography to establish the existence of spirits and ghosts are professed to fraudulently fool innocent people.

== Law ==
Automatism is a defense in criminal law that excludes the responsibility of the crime committed by negating acts reus. In Hill v Baxter, Kilmuir, LC, explained the need of eliminating automatism, defined as "the existence in any person of behaviour of which he is unaware and over which he has no conscious control".

Therefore, a somnambulist or a person under the influence of hypnosis or any other automatic phenomena who steals a property, commits a monetary fraud or participates in any other criminal act will be excluded from actus reus as he has performed the illicit act in a state of unconsciousness.

== Spiritualism and fraud ==
Spiritualism is a belief that the spirits of the dead communicate with the living world. It is essential not to confuse it with 'spirituality'. The latter refers to possessing one's own religious ideals. Spiritualism was based on two fundamental beliefs: that communication with spirits is possible and that they possess advanced knowledge about varied ethical issues including the nature and existence of God. This belief in the unseen opened up avenues for fraudulent activities. The Spiritualist movement came to an end in the 1930s as it lost its credibility due to excessive frauds. There were many instances when the medium seemed completely innocent of the fraud. As the frauds committed under this category lacked physical phenomena, it can be constituted as unconscious fraud.

== See also ==
- Fraud
- Spiritualism
