= Daniel Kish =

Expert in human echolocation

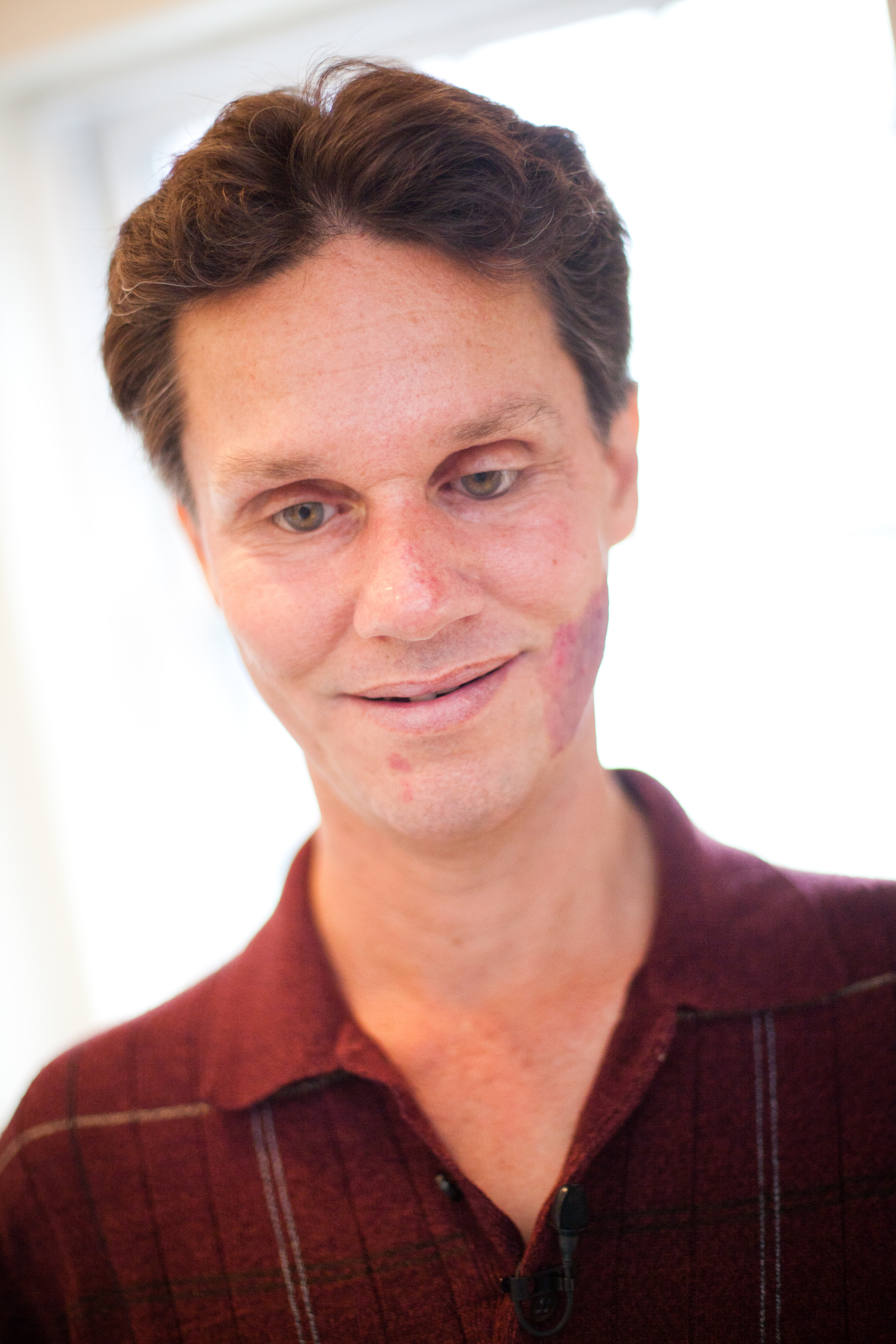
- Daniel Kish in 2011
- Born: 19 March 1966; Montebello, California, U.S.
- Education: University of California Riverside
- Occupations: Founder and President of World Access for the Blind
- Known for: Human echolocation
- Website: Official website

Daniel Kish (born 1966 in Montebello, California) is an American expert in human echolocation and the President of World Access for the Blind (WAFTB), a California-registered nonprofit organization founded by Kish in 2000 to facilitate "the self-directed achievement of people with all forms of blindness" and increase public awareness about their strengths and capabilities. Kish and his organization have taught a form of echolocation to at least 500 blind children around the world.

Kish, who had to have his eyes removed before he was 13 months old because of eye cancer, is the first totally blind person to be a legally certified Orientation and Mobility Specialist (COMS) and to hold a National Blindness Professional Certification (NOMC). He also holds master's degrees in developmental psychology and special education from University of California Riverside.

Kish's work has inspired a number of scientific studies related to human echolocation. In a 2009 study at the University of Alcalá in Madrid, Spain, ten sighted subjects were taught basic navigation skills within a few days. The study aimed to analyze various sounds which can be used to echolocate and evaluate which were most effective. In another study, MRI brain scans were taken of Kish and another echolocation expert to identify the parts of the brain involved in echolocation, with readings suggesting "that brain structures that process visual information in sighted people process echo information in blind echolocation experts."

Kish was named an Ashoka Fellow in 2017. Fellows are leading social entrepreneurs recognized for their innovative solutions to social problems and potential to change patterns across society.

== Bibliography ==
- Kish, Daniel (1995). Evaluation of an Echo-Mobility Program for Young Blind People (Thesis). San Bernardino, CA: Department of Psychology, California State University. p. 277. Archived from the original on February 2, 2002.
- Kish, Daniel, and Hook, Jo (2016). Echolocation and FlashSonar. American Printing House for the Blind. p. 508.
