= Derren Brown =

British illusionist (born 1971)

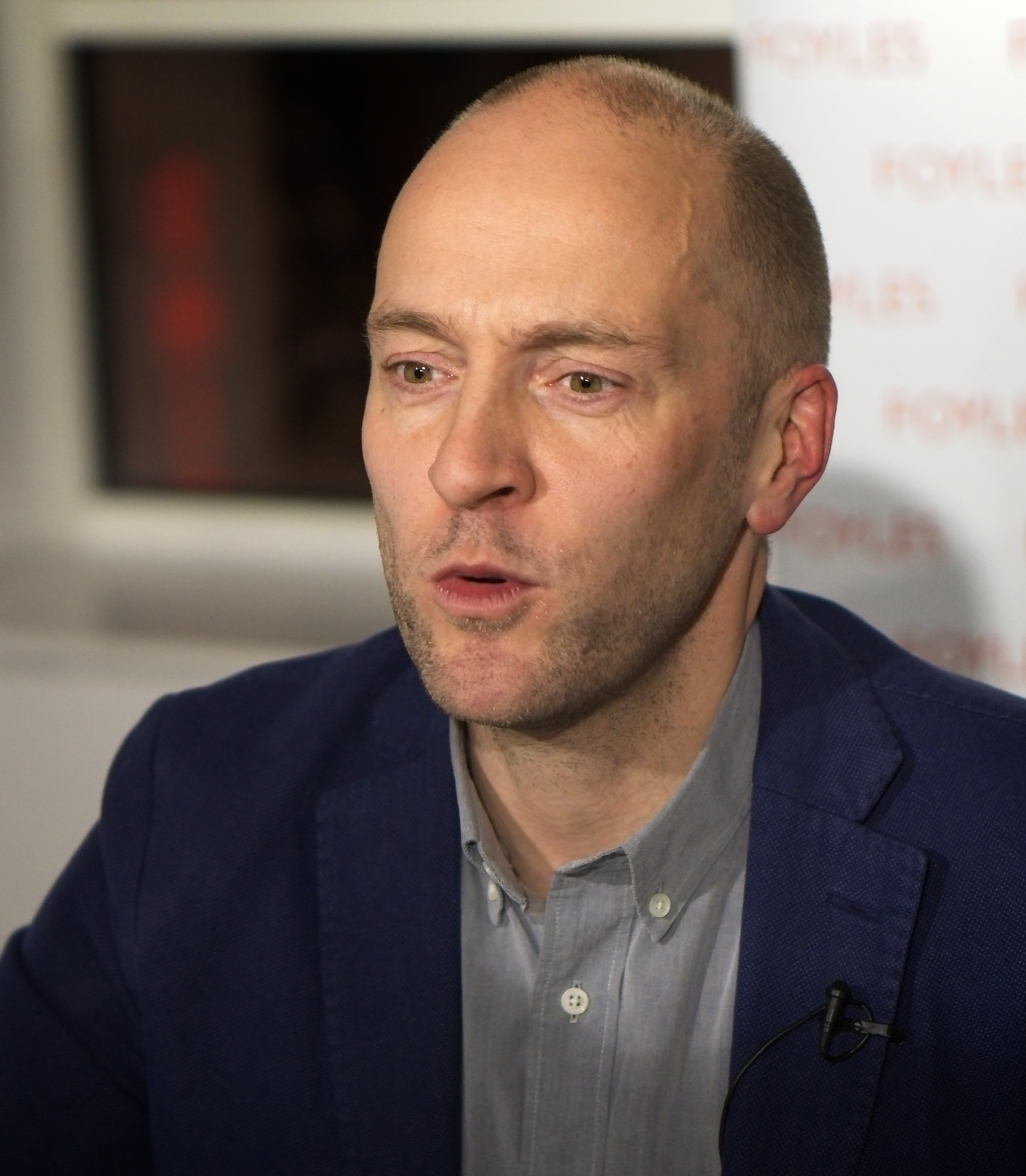
- Brown in 2018
- Born: 27 February 1971 (age 55); London, England
- Education: University of Bristol
- Occupations: Mentalist; illusionist; writer
- Years active: 1992–present
- Website: derrenbrown.co.uk

Derren Brown (born 27 February 1971) is an English mentalist, illusionist, and writer. He is a self-described "psychological illusionist" whose acts are often designed to expose the methods of those who claim to possess supernatural powers, such as faith healers and mediums. His live performances, which incorporate audience participation and comedy, often include statements describing how his effects are achieved through a combination of psychology, showmanship, magic, misdirection, and suggestion.

Brown began performing in 1992, making his television debut with Mind Control (2000). He has since starred in several more shows for stage and television, including Something Wicked This Way Comes (2006) and Svengali (2012) which won him two Laurence Olivier Awards for Best Entertainment, as well as The Experiments (2011) for which he was awarded a BAFTA for Best Entertainment Programme at the 2012 awards. Brown made his Broadway debut with his 2019 stage show Secret. He has also written books for both magicians and the general public.

== Early life, family and education ==
Derren Brown, son of Chris and Bob Brown, was born in Croydon, a borough of London, on 27 February 1971. He was raised in Croydon's Purley area, which he described as "the epitome of middle-class suburbia". He has a brother who is nine years younger than him.

He was privately educated at Whitgift School in South Croydon, where his father was a swimming coach, then studied law and German at the University of Bristol. While there, he attended a hypnotist show by Martin S. Taylor, and it inspired him to seek a career in illusion and hypnosis.

== Career ==
As an undergraduate, he started working as a conjuror, performing the traditional skills of close-up magic in bars and restaurants. In 1992, he started performing stage shows at the University of Bristol under the stage name Darren V. Brown; the "V" stood for "Victor".

At the International Magic shop in Clerkenwell, Brown met Scottish-American magician and comedian Jerry Sadowitz, who put him in touch with H&R Publishers and magician Andrew O'Connor's production company, Objective Productions. This led to his television debut with the show Mind Control (2000), which became one of the company's award-winning productions. After several shows with Objective, Brown set up his own company Vaudeville Productions with former Objective executives Michael Vine, Andrew O’Connor, and Paul Sandler, in order to produce his own shows as well as other projects with other performers. Its first show was Brown's TV special, Pushed to the Edge.

In 2008, Brown made a brief cameo appearance in the supernatural drama series Crooked House. An interview with Brown was featured in Richard Dawkins' 2009 two-part documentary series The Enemies of Reason. Brown explained various psychological techniques used by purported psychics and spiritual mediums to manipulate their audiences. The most notable was cold reading, a technique which he discusses extensively in his book Tricks of the Mind. Some video footage was also used from his TV special Messiah. As part of Channel 4's 3D season in 2009, Brown presented Derren Brown's 3D Magic Spectacular.

In January 2011, to celebrate 10 years since his first television appearance, Channel 4 held a special "Derren Brown Night". As well as re-showing The Heist (which had won a recent poll of favourite Brown specials) and one of his Enigma live shows, the channel screened a special documentary, Derren Brown: Behind the Mischief, a personal and candid film about Brown which included the story of how he met his co-writer (who was featured in Seance), his mother's feelings about his involvement in the Russian Roulette special, and an emotional visit back to his old school, university, and bars/pubs where he first began his career. Celebrity contributors included Matt Lucas, Jo Whiley, Stephen Merchant, and Simon Pegg. In January 2013, he was featured in a Channel 4 Deal or No Deal special, where he appeared to have predicted all the correct boxes to win the big jackpot of £250,000. That same year, he appeared in a comedy sketch at the beginning of an 8 Out of 10 Cats Does Deal or No Deal special.

In January 2014, Brown appeared as himself in the mystery TV series Sherlock episode "The Empty Hearse", as part of a theory regarding how the title character faked his own death. On 9 November 2018, he appeared as a guest on The Joe Rogan Experience to promote his Netflix special Sacrifice.

In February 2021, Brown appeared in a trailer for the horror video game Little Nightmares II, in which he discussed the nature of nightmares while some of the monsters featured in the game appeared around him.

== Methods ==
=== Suggested methods ===
Brown states that he uses a variety of methods to achieve his illusions including traditional magic/conjuring techniques, memory techniques, hypnosis, body language reading, cognitive psychology, cold reading, and psychological, subliminal (specifically the use of "perception without awareness", PWA), and ideomotor suggestion. Some people additionally ascribe methods to him that he denies, ranging from the pseudoscience neuro-linguistic programming (NLP) to paid actors.

In an interview in New Scientist in 2005, when asked how he "acquired his psychological skills", Brown says that he learnt skills as a hypnotist, which he was not sure how to apply until he started performing close-up magic. When asked whether he is able to detect lies, Brown claimed to be able to read subtle cues such as micro-muscle movements that indicate to him if someone is lying. Concerning his apparent success at hypnotising people, he stated that he can normally spot a suggestible type of person and chooses that person to be his participant. He believes that the presence of a television camera also increases suggestibility.

Several authors have claimed that Brown uses NLP in his act which "consists of a range of magical 'tricks', misdirection and, most intriguing, setting up audiences to provide the response that he wishes them to provide by using subtle subliminal cues in his conversation with them". In response to the accusation that he unfairly claims to be using NLP whenever he performs, he wrote, "The truth is I have never mentioned it outside of my book." He does have an off-stage curiosity about the system, and he has discussed it in the larger context of hypnotism and suggestion. In his book Tricks of the Mind, he mentions that he attended an NLP course with Richard Bandler, co-creator of NLP and mentor of Paul McKenna. He also describes the NLP concept of eye-accessing cues as a technique of "limited use" in his book Pure Effect. Brown also mentions in Tricks of the Mind that NLP students were given a certificate after a four-day course, certifying them to practise NLP as a therapist. A year after Brown attended the class, he received a number of letters saying that he would receive another certificate, not for passing a test (as he discontinued practising NLP following the course), but for keeping in touch. After ignoring their request, he later received the new certificate for NLP in the post, unsolicited.

=== Actual versus suggested methods ===
Brown often claims to reveal the methods by which he achieves his tricks, but this is typically an additional layer of misdirection, as the stated methods are not the methods that he uses. The perception by his audience that he uses deep psychological insights typically aids the misdirection required for his tricks. He employs a variety of techniques to ensure his audience cannot deduce the methods behind his illusions. Some critics have argued that his presentation as a sceptic might be misleading, as certain elements of his performances could be interpreted as promoting pseudoscience. For example, after performing a trick in which he appeared to predict lottery numbers, his demonstrated explanation included using the Wisdom of Crowds, but it has been theorised that the actual method relied on split-screen video. Some commentators such as Simon Singh have suggested that such performances might inadvertently conflict with efforts to reduce magical thinking.

In a Daily Telegraph article published in 2003, Simon Singh criticised Brown's early TV appearances, arguing that he presented standard magic and mentalism effects—such as the classic ten-card poker deal trick—as genuine psychological manipulation. On Brown's television and live shows, he often appears to show the audience how a particular effect was created—claiming to use techniques such as subliminal suggestion, hypnosis, and body language reading. Singh's suggestion is that these explanations are dishonest. Furthermore, Singh took exception to the programme's website being categorised under Channel 4's "Science" section. The mini-site was later reclassified under "Entertainment".

In his 2006 book Tricks of the Mind, Brown wrote, "I am often dishonest in my techniques, but always honest about my dishonesty... I happily admit cheating, as it's all part of the game" and claimed to never use actors or "stooges" in his work without informing the viewers, calling it "artistically repugnant and simply unnecessary". However, in an October 2010 interview, Brown conceded that Singh may have had a point, explaining that at the start of his television career "I was overstating the case, overstating my skills. I thought there'll only be one show, there'll never be a repeat, so I might as well go for it."

== Controversies ==
In 2007, BBC News listed Brown's shows Russian Roulette and Seance in a list of examples of Channel 4's "legacy of controversy". Public complaints that Russian Roulette was distasteful, made light of suicide, and promoted gun culture were ultimately rejected by Ofcom on the basis that the context (a post-watershed magic show) was enough and that the warnings given were sufficient. Additionally, the use of a 15-minute time delay ensured no viewer would have seen the result of any mistake. The police had also warned that the show might inspire copycat acts. In 2013, Brown said, "Controversy has never interested me for its own sake. It's always been about doing stuff that feels dramatic."

Seance received a significant number of complaints, including 487 to Channel 4 and 208 to Ofcom. Most were from church groups and came before transmission, i.e. before Brown revealed during the broadcast that his attempt to contact the dead was a hoax. The show was ultimately cleared of any wrongdoing. The GMB union criticised Heist on behalf of security workers, arguing it was "irresponsible and insensitive" in light of increased attacks on staff. Channel 4 responded by arguing that it was made "very clear that attempting any form of robbery was criminal behaviour". An episode of Trick or Treat, which appeared to show Brown convincing someone to press a button even though they thought it would electrocute a kitten inside a metal box, caused charity Cats Protection to complain and news outlets to label Brown a "cat killer". He responded by arguing they had misunderstood the trick as the box was not wired up and that he "wasn’t glorifying cruelty to cats [...] people would have been hard-pressed to recreate the electrocution device at home even if they wanted to". Another episode, which saw someone hypnotised into thinking they had been killed in a car crash after not wearing a seatbelt, was criticised by a road safety charity which alleged it trivialised the issue.

Ofcom received 11 complaints and began an investigation relating to the safety of a scene in Hero at 30,000 Feet, in which the subject was shown chained to a railway line in order to escape from an oncoming train. The show is listed in the "Other Programmes Not in Breach" category of their broadcast bulletin without any explanation as to why it was decided that it is not in breach.

Self-proclaimed psychic Joe Power, the subject of the Derren Brown Investigates episode "The Man Who Contacts the Dead", complained to Ofcom about being misled and treated unfairly and said the programme "presented, disregarded or omitted material facts". He also alleged he had received threats from sceptics and had to move home because of it. Ofcom rejected his complaint on the basis that Power had been fully apprised of the sceptical nature of the programme, and his actions had been presented fairly.

Brown has faced allegations of using stooges in his work. Viewers complained that the subject of Apocalypse was an actor, pointing to his CastingCallPro account as evidence; Brown dismissed these allegations as conspiracy theories and called them untrue and hurtful, while the head of CastingCallPro pointed out that the subject had created an account on the website a long time ago but never completed his profile or looked for work on the website.

== Personal life ==
Although Brown's parents were not practising Christians, they sent him to Bible classes from the age of five because they believed it was the "right thing to do". In an effort to deal with self-esteem and sexuality issues, he became an evangelical Christian as a teenager in order to present himself as confident and asexual, but by the end of his teenage years, he decided that his beliefs had no basis and became an atheist.

In 2007, at the age of 36, Brown came out as gay via an article in The Independent on Sunday. He was dating a designer named Marc at the time, though they later separated after eight years together.

Brown has been the patron of the Parrot Zoo Trust in Friskney since 2004. He told LeftLion, "I'm a big fan of parrots. I think they're fascinating creatures. Many of them live for longer than us humans and it's interesting to me the way they learn to mimic human voices even though they don't really comprehend what they're saying."

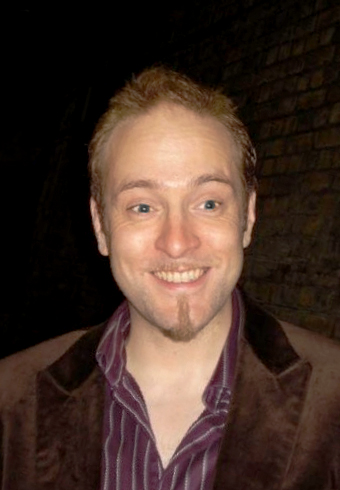
Brown in 2009

Brown's signature look consisted of short brown hair with sideburns and a goatee until he shaved both his head and face in 2013, though he subsequently occasionally sports stubble. He told The Times later that year, "I'm really not fussed about losing my hair. I started going bald when I was doing TV, and the make-up artist started putting all this powdery stuff on to thicken it. I got balder and balder and they put more and more of the stuff on, until it got to this weird point where on TV I had a full head of hair, but in real life I very obviously didn't."

== Works ==
=== Shows ===
==== Television series ====
Year	Series	Episodes	Date(s)	Notes
2000	Mind Control	3	27 December 2000 – 2002	Hour-long specials
2003	Mind Control	6	28 February – 4 April 2003	First full series
2004	Trick of the Mind (Series 1)	6	23 April – 28 May 2004	
2005	Trick of the Mind (Series 2)	6	15 April – 20 May 2005	
2006	Trick of the Mind (Series 3)	6	26 April – 30 May 2006	
2007	Trick or Treat (Series 1)	6	13 April – 18 May 2007	
2008	Trick or Treat (Series 2)	6	2 May – 6 June 2008	
2009	The Events	5	9 September – 2 October 2009	10 minute lottery prediction plus four 1 hour specials
2010	Derren Brown Investigates	3	10 May 2010 – 31 May 2010	
2011	The Experiments	4	21 October 2011 – 11 November 2011	
2024	The Simpsons	1	17 December 2024	Voice appearance, as himself, episode "O C'mon All Ye Faithful" on Disney+
TBA	Incognito	6	TBA	Upcoming six-part series

==== Television specials ====
Year	Special	Date(s)	Synopsis
2003	Russian Roulette	5 October 2003	Brown performs Russian roulette live, at an undisclosed location in Jersey
2004	Séance	31 May 2004	Brown hosts a séance at Elton Hall in east London with students from Roehampton University, claimed to be live, but later confirmed by Brown to have been recorded
2005	Messiah	7 January 2005	Brown travels to the United States and convinces five leading figures that he has powers in their particular field of expertise: Christian evangelism, alien abduction, psychic powers, New Age theories and contacting the dead.
2005	The Gathering	29 May 2005	Brown performs memory tricks in-front of an invited audience at a secret location in London, revealed at the end of the programme via a trick based on a taxi-driver's route
2006	The Heist	4 January 2006	Under the guise of a motivational seminar, Brown uses conditioning over a period of two weeks to influence four members of the public to willingly choose to commit what they perceive to be an actual armed robbery of a security van
2008	The System	1 February 2008	Over several weeks, Brown convinces various members of the public that he has a fool-proof system for choosing the winner of horse-races and persuades them to bet increasingly large sums of money, to the point of convincing one of them to part with their life savings (the system is later revealed to be a confidence trick in which Brown had simply used different people to cover all possible scenarios)
2009	3D Magic Spectacular	16 November 2009	Brown hosts a show in which some of the world's greatest magicians perform in 3D
2010	Hero At 30,000 Feet	8 September 2010	With the help of family and friends, Brown transforms the self-confidence of member of the public Matt Galley through a series of staged incidents to the point where he willingly boards a plane (having been afraid of flying) and then takes the controls when he believes the pilot has been incapacitated (it is later revealed the landing phase was conducted as a simulation)
2011	Miracles for Sale	25 April 2011	Brown teaches an ordinary member of the British public the tricks of faith healers, to the point they can give a convincing performance to a group of church goers in Texas
2012	Apocalypse	26 October 2012 & 2 November 2012 (two part special)	With the help of friends and family, over several days and using a special set, Brown convinces ordinary member of the public Steven Brosnan that the world has ended in a meteor strike, in order to change his perception of his life
2012	Fear and Faith	9 & 16 November 2012 (two part special)	In part 1, Brown uses the cover of a drug trial to convince various members of the public to overcome their fears using "Rumyodin" (your mind). In part 2, Brown convinces various people that they are having supernatural experiences, to the point of convincing an atheist they are having a religious experience
2013	The Great Art Robbery	13 December 2013	Brown convinces a group of old age pensioners to steal a painting owned by art collector Ivan Massow, while at the same time telling Massow the exact time and date it would be stolen (during an exhibition)
2016	Pushed to the Edge (also known as The Push)	12 January 2016	Over the course of one night, during the fictitious launch of a charity called 'Push', Brown is shown attempting to use social coercion to convince one member of the public, Chris Kingston, who doesn't know he's being manipulated or filmed, to push another person off a roof to their apparent death.
2018	Sacrifice	19 October 2018	Netflix special; a member of the public is given a faked medical experiment and told it will increase his bravery and empathy, before being forced to decide whether he would take a bullet for a stranger

==== Stage shows ====
Year	Tour	No. of Shows	Dates	Notes
2003	Derren Brown: Live		2003	Began at the Tobacco Factory Theatre, Bristol
2004	Derren Brown: Live	43	15 March – 16 May 2004	Concluded with a London run at the Palace Theatre. Never recorded for television broadcast.
2005	Something Wicked This Way Comes		March – 18 June 2005	Played for three weeks in the Cambridge Theatre, London, also played at The Old Vic, London.
2006	Something Wicked This Way Comes	44	21 March – 27 May 2006	Won a Laurence Olivier Award for Best Entertainment Show
2007	Mind Reader – An Evening of Wonders	42	29 April – 17 June 2007	
2008	Mind Reader – An Evening of Wonders	72	26 February – 7 June 2008	Concluded with a West End run of 32 performances at the Garrick Theatre
2009	Enigma	73	17 April – 25 July 2009	Included West End run of 30 shows at the Adelphi Theatre
2010	Enigma	92	10 February – 25 June 2010	
2011	Svengali			Tour played in two major West End theatres: Novello Theatre and Shaftesbury Theatre
2012	Svengali			Won a Laurence Olivier Award for Best Entertainment Show
2013	Infamous			
2014	Infamous	128	11 February – 27 July 2014	
2015	Miracle			Included a run at the Palace Theatre, London
2016	Miracle	118	8 February – 16 July 2016	
2017	Underground		8 March – 1 April 2017	A collection of Brown's favourite work from previous shows as a warm-up for his Off-Broadway debut
2017	Secret		21 April – 25 June 2017	First stage show in the United States of America. Performed in New York City at the Atlantic Theater Company
2018	Underground	63	3 April – 5 July 2018	UK and Ireland tour based on the 'Secret' show Included a run at the Playhouse Theatre, London.
2019	Secret		16 September 2019 – 4 January 2020	Brown's Broadway debut, performed at the Cort Theatre
2021	Showman		August - November 2021 & March - October 2022	UK and Ireland tour which was originally planned to start in 2020 (postponed due to COVID-19 pandemic). Includes a run at the Apollo Theatre, London.
2025	Only Human		4 April - 13 September 2025	UK tour
2026	Only Human		5 February - 25 July 2026	Continued UK & Ireland tour

===== Broadcast on television =====
Title	Date	Notes
Something Wicked This Way Comes	29 December 2006	Filmed at The Old Vic, London
Mind Reader – An Evening of Wonders	13 January 2009	Filmed at the Garrick Theatre, London
Enigma	6 January 2011	Filmed at the New Wimbledon Theatre
Svengali	18 September 2012	Filmed at the Theatre Royal, Nottingham
Infamous	22 September 2014	Filmed at the Grand Theatre, Leeds
Miracle	10 October 2016	Filmed at the Palace Theatre, London
Showman	23 April 2023	Filmed at the Apollo Theatre, London

=== DVD releases ===
Title	Release Date	Information
Derren Brown: Inside Your Mind	6 October 2003 (re-released 16 April 2007)	Footage and some unused footage from Brown's Mind Control series
Trick of the Mind: Series 1	25 April 2005	First series of the Channel 4 show Trick of the Mind
Trick of the Mind: Series 2	27 March 2006	Second series of the Channel 4 show Trick of the Mind
Something Wicked This Way Comes	5 May 2008	DVD release of the stage show with the same name, including segments not shown on Channel 4
Derren Brown: The Specials	3 November 2008	Collection of four of Derren Brown's one-off television specials: "The Heist", "The System", "Séance" and "Russian Roulette"
Derren Brown: An Evening Of Wonders	18 May 2009	DVD release of the stage show with the same name
Derren Brown: Enigma	17 January 2011	DVD release of the stage show with the same name
Derren Brown: Live Collection	17 January 2011	Collection of three of Brown's stage shows: Something Wicked This Way Comes, An Evening Of Wonders and Enigma
Derren Brown: The Experiments	15 October 2011	Collection of four of Derren Brown's Experiments: "The Assassin", "The Gameshow", "The Guilt Trip" and "The Secret of Luck"
Derren Brown: Svengali	1 April 2013	DVD release of the stage show with the same name
Derren Brown: Infamous	15 December 2014	DVD release of the stage show with the same name

=== Books ===
Brown has written seven books: Absolute Magic, Pure Effect, Tricks of the Mind, Confessions of a Conjuror, Happy, A Book of Secrets, and Notes From a Fellow Traveller, and released books of his street photography and painted portraiture. The first two books are intended solely for practitioners of magic and mentalism, whilst his books Tricks of the Mind, and Confessions of a Conjuror are aimed at the general public. He has also written a book exploring the history and philosophy of happiness; Happy: Why More or Less Everything is Absolutely Fine.

Absolute Magic, subtitled A Model for Powerful Close-Up Performance, is not so much about magical methodology as about how magicians can make their performances magical; it is written in a variety of styles: sometimes humorous, sometimes serious. Brown critiques performances that he feels lack originality and encourages magicians to create more engaging and audience-focused experiences.Some reviewers have noted similarities between Brown's discussions and Darwin Ortiz's Strong Magic, though Brown frames these ideas within his personal experiences and performance philosophy.

Pure Effect is a more traditional book of trickery and technique and offers an insight into some of the methods that Brown employs, and offers a starting point for development for the reader's own use.

Brown's first two books were intended for magicians; they were written before his fame. He has said that he pulled them from the market when he found that non-magicians would bring them to his shows for autographs. He says he felt bad because, "...they're spending a lot of money on those things and...if they wanted to find out how I was doing the TV shows it wasn't really answering that question."

Tricks of the Mind is Brown's first book intended for the general public. It is a wide-ranging book in which Brown reveals some of the techniques he uses in his performances, delves into the structure and psychology of magic and discusses hypnosis. He also applies his insight to the paranormal industry, looking at the structure of beliefs and how psychology can explain why people become 'true believers'. He also offers autobiographical stories about his own experiences as a former Christian, and discusses his scepticism about religion, allegedly 'psychic' phenomena and other supernatural belief systems.

Confessions of a Conjuror was published by Channel 4 Books in October 2010. It is a mix of autobiography and humorous observation told mostly through footnotes and diversions while Brown describes performing a single card routine for a group of people at his old restaurant gig. (ISBN 978-1-905-02657-9)

Happy: Why More or Less Everything is Absolutely Fine was published on 22 September 2016 by Bantam Press. (ISBN 978-0593076194). A condensed version of the book, entitled A Little Happier: Notes for reassurance, was published on 15 October 2020. (ISBN 978-1787634473)

On 2 September 2021, A Book of Secrets: Finding Comfort in a Complex World was published by Bantam Press.

In 2023 Notes from a Fellow Traveller was published by The Neat Review. It was launched on 4 July at The Magic Circle and is aimed at magicians and mentalists rather than lay people. It is based on a journal written during Brown's sell-out UK Showman tour in 2022/23 and was produced in paperback, hardback and a Deluxe Limited Edition of 300 copies.

=== Other productions and publications ===
Brown co-presented two web-based series for Channel 4; The Science of Scams and The Science of Attraction. In The Science of Scams, a number of videos were placed on YouTube purporting to show various kinds of paranormal phenomena such as ghosts, telekinesis and a tarot card reading. In a second series of videos, Brown and his co-presenter Kat Akingbade explained what was actually happening, exposing each as a specially created scam. The Science of Attraction was co-presented by Brown, Akingbade and Charlotte McDonnell. The shows examined the physical and psychological factors that can influence our feelings of attraction to other people, especially those of the opposite sex. The series featured a number of experiments designed to show how these factors can be influenced.

The Devil's Picturebook is a near 3-hour home-made video. The first half explains in detail some card routines from his earlier career as a conjurer, all of which rely on sleight of hand, misdirection and audience management. The second looks at psychological card routines and shows a distinct move towards mentalism, for which he is now known. It is an instructional video for aspiring magicians and not an entertainment piece. For this reason, it was available only to practitioners through a password-protected "magicians only" area of his website. The clue to the password tells you that the word itself begins with T and is a type of palming trick.

International Magic Presents: The Derren Brown Lecture is an 80-minute lecture DVD of close-up mentalism and subsequent discussion of various aspects of Brown's performance directed at magicians and mentalists.

In 2007, Brown performed in the short film Medium Rare.

In 2008, Brown made a guest acting appearance in BBC Four's Crooked House as Sir Roger Widdowson.

In 2008, Brown provided caricatures for "The QI 'F' annual".

In 2009, a book, Portraits, was released containing a selection of Brown's paintings and bizarre caricatures of celebrities.

In 2010, Brown appeared in a special Comedy Gala for Channel 4 and Great Ormond Street Hospital. He appeared with Kevin Bishop, who played his jealous annoying twin 'Darren'.

=== Thorpe Park ride ===
Brown created a new virtual reality dark ride at the Thorpe Park amusement park, which opened on 8 July 2016. "Derren Brown's Ghost Train" was set aboard an old train carriage in an abandoned warehouse. The experience lasted around 13-15 minutes and was Thorpe Park's most expensive ride experience. The ride had live-action actors and holograms while passengers were strapped in wearing VR headsets. In 2017, the attraction added new experiences to the train and 'Rise of the Demon' to the name. The ride closed in 2022; it was rebranded and rethemed as Ghost Train, a project without Brown's involvement.

=== Playing cards ===
In 2019, Brown collaborated with playing card company Theory11 on a deck of cards that are sold on the company's website.

== Awards and nominations ==
Year	Work type	Title	Award	Result
2000	Television series	Mind Control	Rose d'Or for Light Entertainment	Won Silver Rose
2006	Stage show	Something Wicked This Way Comes	Laurence Olivier Award for Best Entertainment	Won
2007 and 2019			The Academy of Magical Arts Magician of the Year	Won
2010	Stage show	Enigma	Laurence Olivier Award for Best Entertainment	Nominated
2011	Television series	The Experiments	BAFTA award for best entertainment show	Won
2012	Stage show	Svengali	Laurence Olivier Award for Best Entertainment	Won
2014	Stage show	Infamous	Laurence Olivier Award for Best Entertainment	Nominated
2018	Stage show	Underground	Laurence Olivier Award for Best Entertainment	Nominated
2024			The Magic Circle's David Berglas Award	Won
