= Derren Brown: The Events =

British television series

- Title card
- Created by: Derren Brown; Andy Nyman; Iain Sharkey
- Directed by: Simon Dinsell
- Presented by: Derren Brown
- Composers: Ken Bolam and Nick Foster
- Country of origin: United Kingdom
- Original language: English
- No. of series: 1
- No. of episodes: 4

Production
- Executive producers: Derren Brown; Anthony Owen; Andrew O'Connor
- Producer: Hannah Dodson
- Running time: 60 minutes (incl. adverts)
- Production company: Objective Productions

Original release
- Network: Channel 4
- Release: 9 September – 2 October 2009

Related
- Trick or Treat; Derren Brown: The 3D Magic Spectacular

Derren Brown: The Events is a Channel 4 television series featuring the illusionist Derren Brown. Filmed in front of a live studio audience, this series is made up of four one-hour specials, during which Brown attempted what he had described as "some of the most incredible feats to date". The series consisted of a mixture of pre-recorded location pieces connected by theatre-based segments, with each of the four programmes building up to a major stunt performance.

The first trailer broadcast included Brown speaking in reverse but walking forwards with events around him happening forwards. Seemingly cryptic messages were also hidden in the advert such as links to a "Manchester United" website. The advert was later played forwards (although now with Brown moving in reverse), and revealed the premise of the shows. Brown explains that in his new series he will be revealing the "inner workings" of his tricks and "showing you how to get away with it".

== Event 1: How to Win the Lottery ==
The first show, a live event broadcast on Wednesday 9 September 2009, appeared to show Derren Brown predicting that night's lottery draw. This was conducted by a set of white balls lined up, facing a wall, next to a television displaying a live feed from BBC One as they aired the live draw. After the draw, Brown wrote the results on a piece of card prior to turning the white balls around, facing the camera, to reveal that both the numbers on the balls and the numbers on the card were the same. The winning numbers were: 2, 11, 23, 28, 35 and 39. The bonus was number 15, however, his predictions did not include the bonus ball.

On Friday 11 September at 21:00, a second show aired, which stated three possibilities for winning the lottery. The first, faking a winning ticket, was quickly dismissed, and the majority of the programme described Brown's use of automatic writing and crowd psychology to appear to predict the numbers ahead of time. Through a series of experiments and attempts at explaining complex psychology, while avoiding the underlying maths, Brown suggested that he may have predicted numbers using a phenomenon known as the "Wisdom of Crowds". He revealed 24 volunteers who, after a number of previous sessions, were shown to apparently predict the correct numbers by perusing a board filled with previous lottery numbers and guessing that week's through automatic writing. The show concluded with a brief description of how the lottery results could have been rigged, with Brown firmly stating that this would have been illegal and that he would always claim the stunt was simply a trick.

The "Wisdom of Crowds" explanation received considerable negative criticism from the press and leading academics with one journalist writing in The Times "Derren Brown turns from most intriguing man on television to the most irritating". Publicist Max Clifford remarked that the stunt would have "put millions on [Brown's] value in the years to come". Philosopher A C Grayling wrote that "the hour-long 'explanation' was itself a trick, and not as good as the lottery trick itself." Camelot, the company who run the National Lottery, congratulated Brown on his "illusion", and reminded the public that it was "impossible to affect the outcome of the draw". This trick attracted widespread attention, and a number of alternative explanations were proposed, including the use of a split screen camera trick, or a false wall. A poll for the Guardian concluded that a split screen was most likely.

== Event 2: How to Control the Nation ==
On Friday 18 September, the second event was broadcast where Brown attempted to "control the nation" by forcing an inability to get up and walk away from the show. Brown showed a short film, consisting of rotating lines, that was meant to produce a sense of physical inability to rise from one's chair. Approximately half of the live studio audience appeared to experience this effect, though Brown claimed that the percentage of viewers experiencing the sensation would be lower in the less-optimal conditions of their homes.

Brown claimed that his short film used a number of manipulative techniques which would cause involuntary actions if picked up by the viewer, including a message reassuring the watcher that they would remain safe if they remained exactly where they were. Brown later showed a second video which he described as containing a further subliminal message, informing affected viewers that any earlier threat was gone. Additionally, at points throughout the programme, an image was flashed to the viewers showing an illustration of a figure tied to a chair.

== Event 3: How to Be a Psychic Spy ==
On 25 September, inspired by the CIA's top secret Stargate Project, Brown conducted a nationwide experiment in remote viewing - the ability to see and describe an object that is hidden from view. The curator of the Science Museum was asked to paint a simple picture on a canvas, which she then covered over and placed on display in the Science Museum for one week, where visitors could draw what they thought was on the canvas. Brown repeated this with an audience in the museum and viewers at home. The four main things both the visitors and audience drew were: trains, Stonehenge, horses and concentric circles. Near the end of the show, it emerged that between 30% and 35% of people drew some form of concentric circles, this was then revealed as the design painted on the canvas. In an additional twist, the next most common drawing was of Stonehenge (around 10%), and it was revealed that the painter, who had been at a secret location for the duration of the show, was actually at Stonehenge. Additionally, the painter cited Stonehenge as an image that she was imagining to convey the abstract drawing of concentric circles. Additionally throughout the show you were shown the painter's eyes which possibly hinted the concentric circles.

At the end of the show, Brown revealed that the show was recorded three weeks previously, and that he had arranged for adverts influencing people to draw concentric circles to be placed in major newspapers on the day of transmission. Details of where to find these adverts were then given. There was also a subtle technique used during the programme to encourage people to draw concentric circles. No explanation was given as to why many thought that the painting would be of horses or trains.

== Event 4: How to Take Down a Casino ==
On 2 October, Brown attempted to beat the odds at roulette by calculating the winning number based on the speed and trajectory of the ball and wheel. Using £5,000 of a member of the public's money, which he acquired by hypnotising them in the street, Brown aimed to win £175,000 for them. Filming with hidden cameras at a secret location in mainland Europe, Brown in fact made an incorrect prediction, betting on black 8 while the winning number was the adjacent red 30. The show ended on this anticlimax, with the accomplice informed that he would be repaid the £5,000. A stage hand was visible at the end of the show waiting with a large cheque worth £180,000, the amount the accomplice would have received if Brown's prediction had been accurate.

Brown said on his blog hours later that he was "still reeling from tonight's escapade", and in a self-deprecating YouTube video the next week (delivered as an impersonation of Stewie Griffin), Brown remarked that he had "fucked it up" and called it an "epic fail".
