= Adam Adler =

British television executive producer

- Born: London, England, UK
- Education: Bournemouth University
- Occupations: Executive producer, writer, musician
- Employers: Objective Productions (2007–2015); Gameface Productions (2016—)
- Television: The Cube (2009–2015, 2020—2021); Reflex (2014); Alphabetical (2016—2017); Britain's Brightest Family (2018—)

Adam Adler is a British television executive producer, who is currently the managing director of Gameface Productions.

He is best known for creating the triple BAFTA Award–winning television series The Cube.

== Filmography ==
Year	Title	Role	Production company	Channel
2004	Beat the Nation	Assistant Producer	Endemol UK	Channel 4
2009–2015, 2020–2021	The Cube	Creator and Executive producer	Objective Productions	ITV
2014	Reflex	Creator and Executive producer	Objective Productions	BBC One
2016–2017	Alphabetical	Executive Producer	Gameface Productions	ITV
2018–2021	Britain's Brightest Family	Executive Producer	Gameface Productions	ITV

== Career ==
Adam worked for Channel 4 where he was a Commissioning Editor for Entertainment. He previously worked in development at Endemol and Granada.

Adler joined Objective Productions in 2007, but is now the managing director of Gameface Productions.

=== Objective Productions ===
Adler and Objective Productions first approached Channel 4 in 2008 with the format for The Cube. It was made into a non-televised pilot by the channel, presented by Justin Lee Collins. Channel 4 eventually decided not to commission the show because it would have been too expensive. In February 2009, ITV purchased the rights to the show and filming began during April 2009 at Wembley's Fountain Studios with Phillip Schofield as host.

Adler was the executive producer for nine series of The Cube from 2009 until 2015. He also produced the American pilot of The Cube.

Adler was also the creator and executive producer for the BBC primetime game show Reflex in 2014. The format had originally been piloted by Channel 4 in April 2011, who also opted not to order The Cube following a 2008 pilot. A non-broadcast pilot of Reflex was filmed with Jake Humphrey as host in July 2012 at MediaCityUK in Salford. After being commissioned by the BBC, Reflex was filmed at Wembley's Fountain Studios during April 2013. Shane Richie presented the series. The show began airing on 11 January 2014, but received a poor reception from critics and viewers.

=== Gameface Productions ===
With Gameface Productions, Adler has been executive producer for two series of ITV daytime game show Alphabetical, presented by Jeff Stelling and one series of Britain's Brightest Family, a primetime quiz show presented by Anne Hegerty.

=== The Golden Manor Medicine Show ===
Adler's band, The Golden Manor Medicine Show – a London-based Country Soul / Americana group released their debut album on iTunes in 2012.

== Awards ==
Year	Group	Award	Recipient	Result
2010	Broadcast Awards	Best New Programme	The Cube	Nominated
2010	Rose d'Or	Best Game Show	The Cube	Nominated
2011	RTS Awards	Best Entertainment Show	The Cube	Nominated
2011	Broadcast Awards	Best Entertainment Programme	The Cube	Nominated
2011	BAFTA	Best Entertainment Craft Team	The Cube	Won
2011	BAFTA	Best Entertainment Programme	The Cube	Won
2012	BAFTA	Best Entertainment Craft Team	The Cube	Won
2012	National Reality TV Awards	Best Game Show	The Cube	Nominated
2012	TV Choice Awards	Best Game Show	The Cube	Won
2012	Rose d'Or	Best Game Show	The Cube	Nominated
2012	National Television Awards	Best Entertainment Programme	The Cube	Nominated
2013	National Television Awards	Best Entertainment Programme	The Cube	Nominated
2014	National Television Awards	Best Entertainment Programme	The Cube	Nominated
