= Decimation =

Decimation, Decimate, or variants may refer to:

- Decimation (punishment), punitive discipline
- Decimation (signal processing), reduction of digital signal's sampling rate
- Decimation (comics), 2006 Marvel crossover spinoff House of M
- Decimate (game show), 2015 BBC television
- The Decimation, an event in the Marvel Cinematic Universe

== See also ==
- Decimator (disambiguation)
