= The Alphabet Game =

1996 British game show

- Genre: Comedy panel game
- Created by: Rebecca Thornhill; Mark Maxwell-Smith; Andrew O'Connor
- Presented by: Andrew O'Connor
- Country of origin: United Kingdom
- Original language: English
- No. of series: 2
- No. of episodes: 73

Production
- Production location: New Broadcasting House
- Running time: 25 minutes
- Production companies: Objective Productions; BBC North

Original release
- Network: BBC1
- Release: 5 August 1996 – 27 March 1997

Related
- Alphabetical

The Alphabet Game is a comedy panel game show that aired on BBC1 from 5 August 1996 to 27 March 1997 and is hosted by Andrew O'Connor. The programme was created by O'Connor, Rebecca Thornhill, Mark Maxwell-Smith and produced by Objective Productions. It was remade in Spain as Pasapalabra, for which ITV Studios sued Telecinco for €17,000,000; ITV would later remake the show as Alphabetical.

== Format ==
Two members of the public team up with two celebrities each, while a fifth acts as judge. The five celebrities are there all week, while the contestants rotate. Round 1 sees the teams trying to buzz in for control of a question such as 'things I would do if I won the lottery'; the teams must then go through the alphabet to provide answers. The other team can challenge an answer if they feel it is incorrect, in which case the judge decides which team is correct. If the judge decides the challenging team is correct or a team member can't think of an answer, play passes to the other team. This round ends when one team passes Z, and the next consists of the teams trying to create a chain of words each starting with the end of the last. In round three, the teams are given a sentence and asked to finish it, for example "Kevin likes to F". The three members of the other team have a card each with one answer on which the opposing team must give. Each team member gets seven seconds each.

In round four, contestants must try and describe something using word/phrases beginning with each letter. Round five is a repeat of round one to be played until time is up. Round six is played by the winner; if the ties are scored, the teams decide amongst themselves to find one to win the prize for both teams. O'Connor will then ask a question with a three word answer, for example "Who invented the telephone?" and the three team members must answer "A G B" (Alexander Graham Bell). Five correct answers in sixty seconds nets them the prize.

== Transmissions ==
Series	Start date	End date	Episodes
1	5 August 1996	30 August 1996	20
2	13 January 1997	27 March 1997	53

== International versions ==
The format has been aired in France, Spain, Colombia, Argentina, Panama, Portugal, Brazil, Italy, Turkey, Chile, Uruguay, Germany and Greece. The format in countries outside of the UK is more of a straight-laced game show, following the format of the Italian adaptation Passaparola, except the French and the Turkish version aired from 2010 to 2011, with a final round where players have to name an answer to a question for every letter (or the majority of letters) of the alphabet in a time limit.

The round itself comes from an abandoned Dutch quiz show idea called 21×100, created by Reto Luigi Pianta and René Mauricio Loeb, the rights to which are owned by the Dutch company MC&F Broadcasting Production and Distribution C.V.

After the 19 May 2026 Supreme Court verdict in Spain that "El Rosco" could no longer be considered part of the Pasapalabra format, MC&F started to market the show around the world through its subsidiary Good Formats, including an English-language pilot in Los Angeles.

Country	Title	Broadcaster(s)	Presenter(s)	Premiere	Finale
Argentina	Pasapalabra	Azul TV (7 January – 18 March 2002); El Trece (21 January 2016 – 10 April 2020); Telefe (1 March 2021 – 6 November 2022; 26 January 2025 – present)	Claribel Medina (2002); Iván de Pineda (2016–2020; 2021–2022; 2025–present)	7 January 2002	present
Brazil	A Grande Chance	Rede Bandeirantes	Gilberto Barros	24 April 2007	21 June 2008
Chile	Pasapalabra	Chilevisión	Julián Elfenbein	7 January 2018	3 January 2025
Colombia	Pasapalabra	RCN Televisión	Jéssica de la Peña	10 July 2004	2004
France	Rire en toutes lettres	TF1	Nagui	18 October 1997	
France	En toutes lettres (2009–2011); Tout le monde a son mot à dire (2017–)	France 2	Julien Courbet (31 August 2009 – 30 June 2011); Olivier Minne and Sidonie Bonnec (6 March 2017 – 23 August 2025); Bruno Guillon and Sidonie Bonnec (25 August 2025 – present)	31 August 2009	present
Germany	Buchstaben Battle	Sat.1	Ruth Moschner	12 October 2020	28 January 2022
Greece	Πες τη Λέξη; Pes ti Léxi	ERT1	Yorgos Karamihos	22 October 2022	22 December 2024
Italy	Passaparola	Canale 5	Gerry Scotti (11 January – 27 February 1999; 21 June 1999 – 27 January 2008); Claudio Lippi (1 March – 19 June 1999)	11 January 1999	27 January 2008
Panama	Pasapalabra	TVN	Marelissa Him	18 October 2021	23 December 2022
Portugal	Passo a Palavra	RTP1	Nicolau Breyner	2003	2003
Spain	Pasapalabra	Antena 3 (24 July 2000 – 9 June 2006; 13 May 2020 – present); Telecinco (16 July 2007 – 1 October 2019)	Silvia Jato (2000–2002; 2003–2006); Constantino Romero (2002–2003); Jaime Cantizano (2006); Christian Gálvez (2007–2019); Roberto Leal (2020–present)	24 July 2000	present
Turkey	Passaparola	Star TV (14 October 2002 – 11 November 2005; 14 May 2010 – 30 January 2011); Kanal 1 (3 July 2006 – 14 March 2008)	Metin Uca (2002 – February 2005; 2006–2008; 2010–2011); Mehmet Ali Erbil (February – May 2005); Mesut Yar (May – 11 November 2005)	14 October 2002	30 January 2011
Turkey	Parola Parola	TV8	Kaan Sekban	17 August 2024	20 October 2024
United Kingdom (original version)	The Alphabet Game	BBC1	Andrew O'Connor	5 August 1996	27 March 1997
United Kingdom (original version)	Alphabetical	ITV	Jeff Stelling	15 August 2016	27 October 2017
Uruguay	Pasapalabra	Canal 10	Jorge Piñeyrúa	11 March 2019	9 June 2024
