= The Cube (Australian game show) =

Australian television game show

- Genre: Game show
- Created by: Adam Adler
- Based on: The Cube
- Directed by: Gary Deans
- Presented by: Andy Lee
- Country of origin: Australia
- Original language: English
- No. of seasons: 1
- No. of episodes: 10

Production
- Executive producers: Alex Mavroidakis; Andy Lee
- Producers: Elaine May; Josie Steele
- Camera setup: Multi-camera
- Running time: 45—50 minutes
- Production company: ITV Studios Australia

Original release
- Network: Network Ten
- Release: 24 February – 14 April 2021

The Cube was an Australian television game show competition based on the British series of the same name that premiered on Network Ten on 24 February 2021. It is hosted by comedian Andy Lee.

== Format ==
The game is played in teams of two people with a pre-existing relationship and occurs within a 4m × 4m × 4m transparent Perspex cube. The goal is to complete a series of seven games, each of which awards an increasing amount of prize money, before failing a total of nine times. Games are preselected for each individual contestant before the show to test their mental and physical faculties in various ways. A typical episode consists of two contestants' games; depending on how successful the contestants are and on editing, a contestant's game may split across two episodes.

The contestant begins with nine lives, and loses one for every unsuccessful attempt at a game. The contestant must repeat the game until they either complete it or run out of lives; in the latter case, the game ends and the contestants leave with nothing. When a contestant succeeds, they are shown a preview of the next game and can decide to either stop playing and keep their winnings, or continue and risk the money. During a preview, the game is named and described by a female computer voice and demonstrated by a figure dressed in a full-body jumpsuit and featureless metal mask.

Lee occasionally comments on the difficulty that past contestants have had with a game and notes the average number of lives lost while playing it, in order to help the contestant decide whether to continue or stop. Friends and family members in the audience may offer advice on decision-making and techniques for playing the games. Certain games have specific restrictions added to increase their difficulty, such as a time limit or allowing the use of only one hand. If the contestant violates any such restriction, they immediately lose a life.

The contestant is given two forms of assistance, each of which may be used once. "Simplify" reduces the difficulty of a game, such as by allowing more time or increasing the size of a target zone – though the precise nature of the change is not revealed until after the contestant chooses to use Simplify. Simplify may be used after any unsuccessful attempt. The simplification remains in effect until the contestant either completes that game or runs out of lives. "Swap" allows the contestant to switch places when playing a single-player game. This assistance becomes available after they complete the first game, and can only be used upon the introduction of a new one.

The seventh and final game is worth a jackpot of $250,000; contestants who complete this game are said to have "beaten the Cube".

== Production ==
In December 2020, it was announced that Network Ten had commissioned the series to air in early 2021.

Auditions were open between November 2020 and January 2021. The first series was filmed in January 2021 by ITV Studios Australia. It premiered at 7:30 pm on 24 February 2021.

== Prize money ==
Since the first episode, The Cube has had a prize money structure starting at $2,000 and ending at the $250,000 jackpot. Below is a breakdown of the prize money structure, showing the game number and amount of prize money that can be won for successfully completing that game. If a player loses all their lives at any point during the game, they lose all the money they have accumulated to that point.

Stage	Amount
Game 1	$2,000
Game 2	$5,000
Game 3	$10,000
Game 4	$20,000
Game 5	$50,000
Game 6	$100,000
Game 7	$250,000

== Ratings ==
No.	Title	Air date	Timeslot	Overnight ratings		Consolidated ratings		Total viewers	Ref(s)
No.	Title	Air date	Timeslot	Viewers	Rank	Viewers	Rank	Total viewers	Ref(s)
1	Episode 1	24 February 2021	Wednesday 7:30 pm	567,000	9	58,000	9	626,000	
2	Episode 2	3 March 2021	Wednesday 7:30 pm	351,000	17	28,000	17	379,000	
3	Episode 3	10 March 2021	Wednesday 7:30 pm	402,000	15	37,000	14	438,000	
4	Episode 4	17 March 2021	Wednesday 7:30 pm	317,000	17	37,000	17	354,000	
5	Episode 5	24 March 2021	Wednesday 7:30 pm	312,000	19	19,000	18	328,000	
6	Episode 6	31 March 2021	Wednesday 7:30 pm	307,000	18	24,000	19	330,000	
7	Episode 7	6 April 2021	Tuesday 7:30 pm	272,000	>20	—N/a	—N/a	272,000	
8	Episode 8	7 April 2021	Wednesday 7:30 pm	299,000	19	—N/a	—N/a	299,000	
9	Episode 9	13 April 2021	Tuesday 7:30 pm	219,000	>20	—N/a	—N/a	219,000	
10	Episode 10	14 April 2021	Wednesday 7:30 pm	268,000	>20	—N/a	—N/a	268,000	
