= Reflex (game show) =

UK BBC television game show

- Created by: Adam Adler
- Presented by: Shane Richie
- Voices of: Ken Bruce
- Theme music composer: Nick Foster
- Country of origin: United Kingdom
- Original language: English
- No. of series: 1
- No. of episodes: 6 (inc. 1 special)

Production
- Executive producers: Nathan Eastwood; Andrew Newman; Karl Warner (for BBC)
- Producer: Hannah Dodson
- Editor: Warwick Banks
- Running time: 45 minutes
- Production company: Objective Productions

Original release
- Network: BBC One
- Release: 11 January – 29 March 2014

Related
- The Cube

Reflex is a BBC television game show hosted by Shane Richie and aired from 11 January to 29 March 2014 on BBC One.

== Overview ==
Each episode consists of two families of three competing over a number of challenges in order to win their place in the final round and play for up to £20,000. Although most of the games are completed within mere seconds from the starting trigger, viewers watch them almost exclusively in slow motion. The real-time attempts are shown mostly as replays after the heat has finished, which is the reverse of the typical game show practices. All games require from contestants excellent hand-eye coordination, composure and, above all, the titular reflex. The show makes extensive use of both 2D and 3D computer-generated imagery, using for example 3D motion tracking to attach statistics graphics to contestants, or 3D wireframe animations to present the rules of a game.

The teams are color-coded: one wears purple and the other wears orange.

== Gameplay ==
=== Round 1 – Duels ===
Three head-to-head challenges are played, each involving one member of both families. Each player must take part in exactly one challenge. The first to complete a stated objective scores one point for his/her team.

Challenges in this round included: crawling to press a button after smashing through a pane of stunt glass, observing a sequence of exploding objects and pressing buttons on a podium to re-create it, and running through a stack of cans in order to retrieve a single yellow one and place it on a target.

=== Round 2 – Two vs two ===
Two players from each family compete in a single challenge during this round, with two points awarded to the winners.

Challenges in this round included: catching ping-pong balls in a designated color from a stream of them pouring down an incline, and filling a container with water as it is randomly shot from jets placed all around the studio floor.

=== Round 3 – Quiz ===
All six players participate in this round. Each player has two buttons in front of them: an inactive one on which they must place a hand, and an active one set further away. The players are shown a series of photos or graphics and given a condition to watch for, such as a word that is a palindrome. The first player to hit their active button when the condition is met scores one point for their team; however, hitting the button when the condition is not met gives the point to the opponents. Each condition remains in play until someone correctly hits their active button. Players may only use one hand throughout the round.

The first family to reach 10 points wins the game and advances to the Moneyball round, while their opponents leave with nothing.

=== Round 4 – Moneyball ===
One player from the winning family is chosen to play the round. That team member then stands on an elevated 3-metre tall platform in the centre of the studio, with the entire floor padded for safety, and faces three high-speed cannons located to either side of him/her and directly in front. The family's score is reset to zero.

Fifteen large green rubber balls are randomly fired at the player, followed by fifteen red ones. The player must touch as many of the green balls as possible and avoid the red ones, respectively scoring and losing one point for each ball touched. In addition, the player loses one point every time he/she falls off the platform. If the player has any points after all the red balls have been fired, the family wins £10,000; if not, the round ends immediately and they leave with nothing.

Any family that wins the £10,000 is then given the option to end the game at this point and keep the money, or risk it in a double-or-nothing gamble. If the family takes the gamble, the same player returns to the platform and must attempt to touch a single golden ball fired by one of the cannons at a random moment. Successfully doing so doubles the family's winnings to £20,000, while a failure forfeits the £10,000. The speed and angle of the shot are set in such a way that the player will have to leap off the platform in order to touch the ball.

== Production ==
The series and host were announced in January 2013. The format had originally been piloted by Channel 4 in April 2011, who also opted not to order The Cube following a 2008 pilot. Both shows are created by Adam Adler from company Objective Productions. A non-broadcast pilot was filmed with Jake Humphrey as host in July 2012 at MediaCityUK in Salford. After being commissioned by the BBC, Reflex was filmed at Wembley's Fountain Studios during April 2013.

== Technology ==
Reflex relies heavily on the use of high-speed cameras to capture the action unfolding at great speed. Using a NAC/Ikegami Hi-Motion II Camera, the contestants are filmed competing in tasks at up to 1000 frames per second (fps), which, when played back at conventional television speeds of 25 fps, allows the action to last for up to 40 times longer. At these speeds, human reactions lasting of the order 0.1 seconds are drawn out to 4 seconds in length, allowing for detailed analysis of the challenges.
