= The Album (Shane Richie album) =

Studio album by Shane Richie
- Released: 1997
- Genre: Pop
- Label: Universal

Shane Richie chronology
The Album (1997)	Once Around the Sun (2000)

The Album is the debut studio album by British actor and singer Shane Richie. The album was released in 1997 and re-released in 2003 after Richie joined the cast of EastEnders. It contains mostly cover versions.

== Track listing ==
1. "Sorry Seems to Be the Hardest Word" (4:15)
2. "How Long" (4:12)
3. "Just When I Needed You Most" (4:08)
4. "Daydream Believer" (3:17)
5. "A Little Bit More" (4:49)
6. "Love Grows (Where My Rosemary Goes)" (2:50)
7. "If" (3:10)
8. "How Can I Be Sure" (2:54)
9. "Angel's Gate" (3:14)
10. "She's Gone" (5:24)
11. "Bigger Than the Sky" (3:38)
12. "Tired of Being Alone" (3:04)
13. "I'm Gonna Make You Love Me" (3:58)
14. "Now We Don't Talk" (4:31)
15. "What a Fool Believes" (4:38)
16. "Everybody Wants to Rule the World" (4:10)
17. "Goodbye" (3:58)
18. "Grease Is the Word" (Cut the Quiff Mix) (3:42)
