= Bedsitcom =

British reality television hoax series

- Genre: Reality television; Sitcom
- Created by: Peter James; Andrew O'Connor
- Written by: Paul Alexander; Jesse Armstrong; Sam Bain; Sean Carson; Neil Gibbons; Rob Gibbons; James Simpson
- Directed by: Justin Bradley
- Starring: Melanie Ash; David Brand; Paul Gibbon; Dave Johnson; Rufus Jones; Jessica Lathan; Jeanne Mockford; Barrington; Bob; Shirine
- Narrated by: Sadie Frost
- Country of origin: United Kingdom
- Original language: English
- No. of series: 1
- No. of episodes: 8

Production
- Producers: Matt Crook; Kirsty Smith
- Camera setup: Multi-camera
- Running time: 22-26 minutes per episode
- Production company: Objective Productions

Original release
- Network: Channel 4
- Release: 8 December – 18 December 2003

Bedsitcom is a British reality television hoax series that was broadcast on Channel 4 in December 2003. Pitched as "somewhere between a sitcom and a reality TV show", the show documented the lives of six young people living in a loft flat in London. Its hook was that its TV audience was aware that three of the participants—named Mel, Paul and Rufus—were actually actors being directed by a trio of "writers" in a garage on the ground floor.

Bedsitcom was commissioned by the Channel Four Television Corporation and produced by Objective Productions. Producers auditioned thousands of people to be the show's genuine subjects and selected from them six young adults to live in the flat with the three actors. These six participants were told that they would be starring in a new reality TV series called Making Friends, and featured on the show three at a time over a period of eight weeks. The programme ran for a single series of eight episodes and featured various storylines, involving dead goldfish, dodgy dealings, promiscuous mothers and telephone psychics.

The show received largely negative feedback from television reviewers, who criticised the show's premise as a "deeply offensive" idea. It received a viewership peak of 1.2 million with its final episode, giving it an audience share of 8.9 per cent. Bedsitcom was not recommissioned for a second series and is currently not available either on DVD or on Channel 4's on demand service, 4oD.

== Production ==
=== Concept ===
Bedsitcom was created by Peter James and Andrew O'Connor, and was conceived as a parody of both reality television and the traditional sitcom. It combined these two elements by featuring three members of the public being unknowingly placed in extraordinary situations by three actors being directed by writers. After being commissioned for Channel 4 by Danielle Lux, Bedsitcom was produced by Matt Crook and Kirsty Smith of Objective Productions.

The show was pitched as "somewhere between a sitcom and a reality TV show" and was promoted as "an entirely new genre of television programme". Its title is a portmanteau of the words "bedsit"—a British term referring to a form of rented accommodation consisting of a single room and shared bathroom—and "sitcom". The title is technically a misnomer: as the accommodation's bedroom and sitting area were separate, it was not a bedsit.

=== Casting ===
The two generations of cast in Bedsitcom.
Top, l-r: Paul, Rufus, Bob, Shirine, Dave and Mel.
Bottom, l-r: Paul, Mel, David, Barrington, Rufus and Jessica.

Melanie Ash, Paul Gibbon and Rufus Jones were selected as the three actors to feature in Bedsitcom. Jones had previously portrayed the part of Crispin in the 2002 drama White Teeth; Gibbon had played the lead role of Link in the series Stone Cold. To avoid breaking character, all three used their real names while living in the flat and went through weeks of rehearsals. O'Connor described the entire process as "exhausting".

To find suitable candidates to live with the three actors, producers auditioned roughly 10,000 people, who were told that they would be taking part in a new reality television programme in London called Making Friends. Six members of the public, named Barrington, Bob, Dave, David, Jessica and Shirine, were selected to feature on the show.

=== Writing and filming ===
The plots for Bedsitcom were devised by a team of writers (led by Rob Gibbons, Neil Gibbons and producer Matt Crook) located in a garage on the ground floor of the apartment building that the contestants were staying in. The writers would often appear on screen and explain to the TV audience what their intention for each episode was. They communicated with Ash, Gibbon and Jones either by ringing them on their mobile phones, or by calling them downstairs to speak to them in person. They would occasionally change their plans for an episode—in "Worst Case Scenario", for example, the writers altered their storyline from having Mel bring various animals into the flat to having the group kill Mel's goldfish after only one night.

Among the team of writers were Jesse Armstrong and Sam Bain, who had created the Channel 4 sitcom Peep Show with O'Connor earlier that year, plus Rob Gibbons and Neil Gibbons. Filming of Bedsitcom began in May 2003 and lasted for approximately eight weeks. The flatmates were filmed for 12 hours a day, with this footage then being edited down to roughly 25 minutes per week of filming.

== Episodes ==
Bedsitcom documented the lives of six young adults living in a loft flat in London. Eight episodes in total were created, which were divided into two distinct halves. The first four episodes centred on the lives of Mel, Paul and Rufus, the three actors, as they lived in the flat with Bob, Dave and Shirine, the three unaware members of the public who believed they were taking part in a genuine reality TV show. After Bob, Dave and Shirine had learnt the true nature of the show at the end of episode four, they moved out and were replaced by three new members of the public named Barrington, David and Jessica. These three new cast members remained on Bedsitcom for the final four episodes.

No.	Title	Directed by	Original release date
1	"A Mother's Love"	Justin Bradley	8 December 2003
The group are visited by Paul's mother Yvonne (actress), who develops a romantic interest in Rufus (actor) and asks Shirine to set up a date with him at a restaurant. Not wanting Yvonne to get the wrong idea, Rufus asks Bob to accompany him. The writers' initial idea is to make Bob so uncomfortable that he will leave, but, after he continues to stay at the restaurant, they change the storyline to have Rufus run out of the restaurant and go home in a taxi, leaving Bob to deal with Yvonne alone.
2	"Worst Case Scenario"	Justin Bradley	9 December 2003
Mel (actress) departs the flat for a while, leaving Bob a note asking him to take care of her grandmother's pet goldfish. The writers' initial storyline is to have Mel return to the flat with various exotic animals, but after they see Dave throwing vodka into the goldfish bowl, they decide to change the plot to have the group kill Mel's goldfish after only one day. The writers remove the goldfish during the night and replace it with an identical, dead one. After discovering the dead goldfish and assuming that they have killed it, the group spend the rest of the day hunting around pet shops trying to find an identical one. The episode ends with Mel's grandmother (Jeanne Mockford) visiting to check on her goldfish, and commenting that she thinks it looks "a bit bigger" than before.
3	"The Third Degree"	Justin Bradley	10 December 2003
Rufus (actor) is called in for an interview to assess his continuation of the art history course that he is studying with the Open University. The rest of the flatmates help him to prepare for this interview by teaching him about the life of Leonardo da Vinci—however, all he is able to remember is the year of Leonardo's birth and that he was the son of a peasant woman. Come the day of his interview, Rufus gets a migraine and convinces Bob to take the interview in his place. Partway through the meeting, the interviewer (actress) receives a phone call from Rufus's father (played by one of the writers), who asks to speak with his son. After being handed the telephone, Bob discreetly hangs up on him, fakes a brief conversation, makes his excuses and promptly leaves.
4	"Fag Ends"	Justin Bradley	11 December 2003
Mel (actress) takes a job as a telephone psychic and convinces Shirine to try it as well. "Psychic Shirine"'s first caller (played by one of the writers) is particularly rude and questions her credentials. Meanwhile, Paul (actor) claims that his friend Terry (actor) can obtain almost any item that is requested of him, mainly through dodgy dealings. After Bob jokingly asks for a thousand cigarettes and an expensive jacket, the flatmates are surprised when Terry delivers the goods. Shirine finds the entire situation particularly unbelievable and begins to question everything that has occurred in the flat during their time living there. The writers realise that she is close to discovering the true nature of the show, so inform the group through one of the producers that three of them are actors. The writers try to suggest that Dave has starred in the film 24 Hour Party People, and Rufus (actor) accuses Bob of being an actor. Eventually, Rufus, Paul and Mel reveal that they are the actors.
5	"Scrotal Support"	Justin Bradley	15 December 2003
Bob, Dave and Shirine have moved out, and three new unaware members of the public—named Barrington, David and Jessica—move in with the actors. During this episode, the group discover a pair of women's underwear in Rufus's (actor) laundry. He confesses to occasionally wearing them and wonders how he can explain this to his girlfriend Jo (actress). Rufus intends to confess his secret to Jo over dinner that evening with everyone else, so Paul (actor) suggests to David that the two of them should show solidarity to Rufus by wearing female underwear as well. During the meal, Rufus cannot bring himself to tell his secret, forcing David to do it for him. It also emerges that Paul was too afraid to wear the women's underwear, so David is the only person around the table wearing them.
6	"Two Hundred and One"	Justin Bradley	16 December 2003
Paul (actor) asks Barrington and David how many women they have slept with, then boasts that he has been with more than 200. He explains the methods he uses to pick up women, such as the "love switch", which involves slapping a woman that he likes on the buttocks. He also lists his pick-up lines, including "Give me a shag, or I'll smack yer" and "Why don't you get us some condoms, NOW!" The group question Paul's claims and take him to a bar to try out his techniques. While at the bar, Rufus (actor) points out an attractive young woman (actress) and suggests that Paul try to seduce her. The group are amazed when Paul is successful.
7	"Bad Monkey"	Justin Bradley	17 December 2003
Rufus (actor) wants the group to get to know better his girlfriend Jo (actress), and invites her round to the flat for lunch. Situations become tense when Rufus's flatmates witness Jo steal from his wallet, and begin to suspect that she may only be with him for his money. As the episode progresses, they overhear what sounds like Jo flirting with another man over the phone and making arrangements to meet up with him. After seeing her meeting with a man in a London café, the group decide to inform Rufus of Jo's infidelity. The episode ends with the group finding Rufus passionately kissing another woman (actress), revealing that he has also been unfaithful.
8	"P.I.G"	Justin Bradley	18 December 2003
Barrington, David and Jessica begin to suspect that Rufus (actor) may not be all that he seems, so the writers ask him to tell the group that he is the only actor and to leave the show. The writers then begin a new storyline involving Mel (actress) fancying Paul (actor). Mel confesses that she thinks Paul is "lovely" and asks David to find out if Paul feels the same way. David asks Paul, who responds that he thinks Mel is a "pig". Barrington, David and Jessica continue to be suspicious of the true nature of the programme, so the writers abandon the Mel and Paul storyline. Instead, they orchestrate a new one involving Barrington, David and Jessica discovering the garage that the writers have been using to spy and keep notes on the group. Under the pretence of being summoned by their landlord, the three flatmates discover the garage and are told what the show has really been about. The episode ends with the three of them having champagne with the Mel, Rufus and Paul, who confesses to having only ever slept with "about five" women.

== Reception ==
=== Critical reception ===
Reviewers gave Bedsitcom generally negative feedback. Some were critical of the storylines that had been devised by the writers, calling them unimaginative and clichéd. Others were critical of the premise of the show itself, describing it as "deeply offensive and manipulative"—all three actors, particularly Jones, received criticism for their acting abilities. Frances Traynor of The Daily Record called the show "about as funny as sharing a flat with that German cannibal" and Paddy Sherman of The Liverpool Echo branded the show "intensely irritating". Paul Hoggart of The Times called it "a show that seemed to have nothing to recommend it whatsoever",—after watching the first episode, Charlie Catchpole of The Daily Star simply stated: "It isn't funny." Critics on Newsnight Review also spoke harshly about the programme, with Tom Paulin calling it "a disgraceful piece of television" and Jeanette Winterson describing it as "incredibly dull".

"Bedsitcom might have worked as a 90-minute one-off with the unveiling at the end. By spinning out the encounter over almost eight hours, this punningly titled series suggests that a more honest title would have been: Flat."

— Mark Lawson, writing in The Guardian

A slightly more positive review came from Joe Joseph of The Times, who suggested that "if [the format] works, [it] could be profitably franchised around the world". Deborah Bull said that, while it was "a terrible programme", there were "some funny lines". Chris Wilson, editor of Collective, similarly wrote that "while the end results are often amusing and tackle some interesting storylines, the whole project smacks of lazy, cruel television".

In a 2005 interview, series creator Andrew O'Connor spoke about Bedsitcom and the critical reaction that it had received. He said that he felt that the premise of the show was a "great idea", but that it did not make "great television". He also remarked: "We didn't cast it right and the public didn't take to the series."

=== Ratings and awards ===
Given the level of exposure and promotion that it had been granted, Channel Four were disappointed by ratings for Bedsitcom. The pilot, shown on 8 December 2003, generated 1 million viewers, but this figure had fallen to 700,000 by 10 December. The ratings rose to 1.1 million viewers for the fourth episode, "Fag Ends". On average, the series attracted an audience share of less than 6 per cent. The final episode, "P.I.G", gained a viewership of 1.2 million with a market share of 8.9 per cent, which was its highest audience for the series. Bedsitcom was nominated for a single award at the 2004 Rose d'Or festival, a European awards show that commemorates achievement in entertainment television. The programme was submitted in the Best Situation Comedy category, but was beaten by Peep Show.

Year	Award	Category	Result
2004	Rose d'Or	Best Situation Comedy	Nominated

== Distribution ==
Bedsitcom was distributed by the Channel Four Television Corporation, who broadcast the show on its eponymous channel. It premiered in the UK at 10:40 p.m. on 8 December 2003. Bedsitcom's eight episodes were 'stripped' over two weeks: the first four were broadcast nightly until 11 December and the remaining four were shown each night from 15 December. There are currently no plans to revive the series, and it is not available either on DVD or on 4oD, Channel 4's on demand service.

== See also ==
- 2003 in British television
- The Dutch Elm Conservatoire – a British sketch comedy group featuring Jones
- The Joe Schmo Show – a similar American series
