= Bad Robots =

British television prank show

- Also known as: Bad(ish) Robots (pre-watershed edition)
- Genre: Comedy
- Created by: Nathan Eastwood
- Written by: Ben Spiteri; Paul Routledge; Lee Kern; Charlie O'Connor (additional material); George Sawyer
- Directed by: Paul Routledge
- Voices of: Lee Kern; Michael Gambon; Rob Delaney; Tom Allen; Terry Mynott; Matthew Holness
- Country of origin: United Kingdom
- Original language: English
- No. of series: 2
- No. of episodes: 12

Production
- Running time: 35 minutes

Original release
- Network: E4
- Release: 11 November 2014 – 29 September 2015

Bad Robots is a British television prank show that originally aired on E4 from November 2014. Made by Objective Productions, the show centres on a fleet of seemingly defective and even mischievous machines, devices and robots produced by the fictional TezCorp Industries. Unsuspecting members of the public were filmed using these everyday machines, resulting in practical-joke and hidden-camera laughs.

The series was created by Nathan Eastwood, directed by Paul Routledge, and written and produced by Ben Spiteri. Motion graphics for the series were created by Compost Creative. A host of comedy talent provided voices for the machines, Michael Gambon, Simon Greenall, Rob Delaney, Terry Mynott, Diane Morgan and Tom Allen.

The first episode drew an average audience figure of 338,000.

== Transmissions ==
Series	Start date	End date	Episodes
1	11 November 2014	16 December 2014	6
2	25 August 2015	29 September 2015	6

== List of Machines ==
Model No.	Machine	Voice Over (unconfirmed*)	No. episodes
TEZ1	BAD ROBOT	Michael Gambon	12
TEZ#002	Digi-Photo-Matic photo booth	Matthew Holness	7
TEZ#003	Frank and Send postage machine	Tom Allen	4
TEZ#004	Non-Stop Radio	N/A	2
TEZ#005	Hotel BOT	Lee Kern	1
TEZ#006	Cinema BOT	Lee Kern	1
TEZ#007	Charge-O-Matic mobile phone charger	Annabel Raftery	2
TEZ#008	Tourist Information Machine	Nico Tatarowicz	5
TEZ#009	Cab BOT	Lee Kern	1
TEZ#010	Con-Struct-A-Bear	Dave Benson-Philips	3
TEZ#011	Reception BOT	Lee Kern	1
TEZ#012	Audio Tour Guide	Simon Greenall*	1
TEZ#013	Bouncer BOT	Lee Kern	1
TEZ#014	Maxwave Microwave	N/A	1
TEZ#015	Takeaway BOT	Lee Kern	1
TEZ#016	Floor Buffer with autobuff mode	Matthew Holness*	2
TEZ#017	Nails Babez manicure machine	Matthew Le Tissier*	1
TEZ#018	Tezbrowze web browser	Matthew Holness*	1
TEZ#019	TezToys: Yank It!	Rob Delaney	1
TEZ#020	British Language Test	Simon Greenall*	2
TEZ#021	Vet BOT	Lee Kern	1
TEZ#022	Self-Serving Chocolate Fountain	Matthew Le Tissier*	2
TEZ#023	Border Control BOT	Lee Kern	1
TEZ#024	S.A.L.Y (Survey - Analysis - Learning - You) survey machine	Ross Kemp	2
TEZ#025	Career BOT	Lee Kern	1
TEZ#026	DNA Testing Machine	Simon Greenall*	1
-	British Roadways Centre: 2014-2015 Theory Test	Terry Mynott*	4
-	Change Machine	Rob Delaney	1
-	Digi-e-Card booth	Felicity Montagu	1
-	Dog motorbike kids' rides	N/A	2
-	Hear 2 Stay hearing test machine	Rob Delaney	1
-	London Global Money Exchange machine	Adam Buxton	2
-	Optical Prime eye test machine	Simon Greenall*	3
-	Parking Ticket Machine	Terry Mynott*	3
-	Power roller with automatic painting assistant	Rob Delaney	1
-	Quiziemodo Pub Quiz Machine	Matthew Holness	8
-	Simple Samples	Kelly-Anne Lyons	5
-	Speak & Search shopping companion/reference index	John Hopkins	7
-	Tandalous spray tanning booth	Diane Morgan (S01)/Vikki Stone (S02)	2
-	Tez Tees golf ball dispenser	Matthew Le Tissier*	1
-	Tezcorp Alarm System	Rob Delaney	1
-	Traffic Sign	N/A	2
-	Water Cooler	N/A	1
