= Lucky Numbers (game show) =

- Genre: Game show
- Presented by: Shane Richie
- Country of origin: United Kingdom
- Original language: English
- No. of series: 3
- No. of episodes: 50

Production
- Production location: Granada Studios
- Running time: 30 minutes (inc. adverts)
- Production company: Granada Television

Original release
- Network: ITV
- Release: 9 January 1995 – 4 July 1997

Lucky Numbers is a weekly Bingo-based game show that aired on ITV from 9 January 1995 to 4 July 1997 and was hosted by Shane Richie.

The show was one of the first UK game shows which allowed viewers to take part at home and win. The show was sponsored by The Sun newspaper, and allowed viewers who bought a copy to play along using an enclosed game-card for a chance to win shares of a £20,000 cash prize.

Nick Weir was the host of the show in an unbroadcast pilot recorded in 1994, predating his official game show career debut, On the Ball (1997) by three years, the latter show also being a Granada Productions series.

This show had no relation to an American game show pilot of the same name, recorded in 1985 and hosted by Alex Trebek. It was similar in gameplay to the American game show Trump Card, which aired from 1990 to 1991 and was hosted by Jimmy Cefalo.

== Main Game ==
Each audience member was assigned a different number from 1 to 200 (later 250), matching the balls in a giant onstage lottery machine called RANDI. Three balls were drawn at random and launched across the stage for the host to catch, and the audience members with those numbers became the contestants for that episode. Each contestant was given a Bingo card with three rows of five spaces each. Numbers on the top, middle and bottom rows respectively ranged from 1-15, 16-30 and 31-45, with every number appearing once among the three cards.

The main game was played over three rounds, with the host asking questions on the buzzer. A correct answer lit a number on that contestant's card, chosen at random in keeping with the objective of the particular round, while a miss froze them out of the next question. Objectives were as follows:

- Round 1: Light all four corners.
- Round 2: Light all five numbers on the middle row. Five categories were available; the winner of Round 1 chose one to start, and the contestant who correctly answered a question chose for the next one. The same category could not be used on two consecutive questions.
- Round 3: Light all remaining numbers on the card (a Full House).

The first two rounds awarded £500 each, while the third awarded £1,000 and allowed its winner to advance to the Cash Dash.

== Cash Dash (Bonus Round) ==
The winner decided how much of their total to wager and was shown a 5-by-5 square grid of numbers from 1 to 25. Two numbers were chosen at random and marked off with pound signs (£), after which the contestant had 45 seconds to complete a horizontal, vertical or diagonal line of five spaces. They chose a number and were asked a question; a correct answer marked the number off, while a pass or miss blocked it out. If the contestant completed a horizontal/vertical/diagonal line before time ran out, the wager was multiplied by 10 and added to whatever amount they had not gambled. If not, the wager was deducted from their winnings.

The maximum potential winnings total was £20,000, obtainable by winning all three rounds in the main game, wagering the entire £2,000 total, and winning the Cash Dash.

== Home Game ==
Game-cards included with The Sun had the same 15-number layout as those used on the show. During the main game, home viewers with cards could cross off the numbers earned by contestants for correct answers. Four pound signs on the stage backdrop lit up one by one over the course of the game to indicate how much time was left; the home game ended once all four were lit or a contestant won Round 3, whichever came first. Any viewers who had crossed off all 15 numbers could send in their cards and receive equal shares of that week's £20,000 cash prize. New cards were issued each week.

== Transmissions ==
Series	Start date	End date	Episodes
1	9 January 1995	1 May 1995	17
2	24 May 1996	20 September 1996	17
3	14 March 1997	4 July 1997	16
