= Decimator =

Decimator may refer to:

- The collector or recipient of tithes
- Heinrich Decimator (c.1544 – 1615), a German Protestant theologian, astronomer and linguist
- Decimator (Farscape), a fictional race in the TV series Farscape
- Decimator (G.I. Joe), a fictional character in the G.I. Joe: A Real American Hero series
- Decimator (signal processing), a component that reduces a digital signal's sampling-rate
- Decimator (Star Wars), a fictional weapon in the game Star Wars: Galactic Battlegrounds
- Decimator, a fictional character from VR Troopers
- Decimator, a fictional character in The Jimmy Timmy Power Hour
- Decimator, a song by Canadian extreme metal band Strapping Young Lad from their 2006 album The New Black

== See also ==
- Decimation (disambiguation)
