= Shane Richie =

British actor and singer (born 1964)

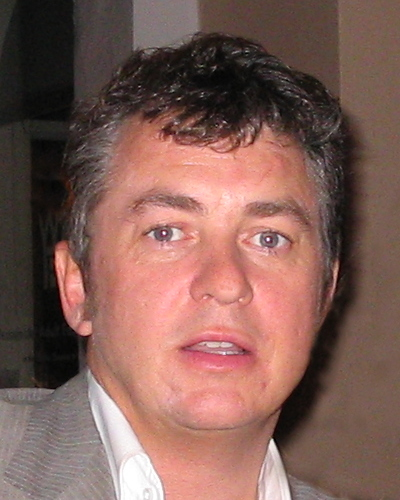
- Richie in 2005
- Born: Shane Patrick Paul Roche; 11 March 1964 (age 62); Kensington, London, England
- Citizenship: United Kingdom; Ireland
- Occupations: Actor; comedian; presenter; singer
- Years active: 1978–present
- Known for: Role of Alfie Moon in EastEnders
- Notable work: EastEnders (2002–2005, 2010–2016, 2018–2019, 2022–); Kat and Alfie: Redwater (2017); Flushed Away (2006)
- Spouses: Coleen Nolan (m. 1990; div. 1999); Christie Goddard (m. 2007; div. 2026)
- Children: 5, including Jake Roche

Shane Patrick Paul Roche (born 11 March 1964), known as Shane Richie, is an British actor, comedian, presenter and singer. Following initial success as a stage and screen performer, he became best known for his portrayal of the character Alfie Moon in the BBC One soap opera EastEnders (appearing 2002–2005, 2010–2016, 2018–2019, 2022–present) and then in its spin-off RTÉ drama series Redwater in 2017. In 2020, he appeared on the twentieth series of I'm a Celebrity...Get Me Out of Here and finished in fourth place.

Richie has presented a number of BBC game shows including Reflex, Win Your Wish List and Decimate.

He also regularly appears in pantomime and has repeatedly starred as Robin Hood. He first took the role appearing at the Mayflower Theatre, Southampton in 2016, then repeated it in 2017 at the New Victoria Theatre, Woking. He then reprised the role once again in 2018 at the Milton Keynes Theatre. In 2019, he starred alongside Jennie Dale as the title character in Dick Whittington at the Bristol Hippodrome in Bristol.

== Early life ==
Richie was born Shane Patrick Paul Roche on 11 March 1964 at St Mary Abbots Hospital in Kensington, London, to Irish parents. He attended Willesden High School, and was a member of a youth theatre as a child.

== Career ==
=== Career beginnings ===
Richie began his professional career in adolescence as a bluecoat entertainer at a Pontins holiday camp Little Canada, on the Isle of Wight. He progressed to the live stand up circuit, receiving a nomination for best new stand-up at the inaugural British Comedy Awards.

In 1989, Richie made nightly appearances for Sky TV's chat show series Jameson Tonight, which was hosted by Derek Jameson and Richie and recorded at the Windmill Theatre, London. In 1990, Richie made his first terrestrial television appearances as one of the comics on the BBC One sketch show Up to Something! with Suzy Aitchison, David Schneider, Frances Dodge, Mike Hayley and Lewis MacLeod; however, the show was axed after one series. Richie was one of five comics, along with Maddi Cryer, Annette Law, George Marshall and Billy Pearce.

Richie later branched out into hosting game shows after proving successful as host of the children's quiz show Run the Risk, which was played during the BBC Saturday morning show Going Live!. He moved into mainstream presenting with Caught in the Act, Win, Lose or Draw, The Shane Richie Experience (later revamped as Love Me Do) and Lucky Numbers. He also replaced Danny Baker in the 'doorstep challenge' TV ads for Daz detergent; he had previously replaced Baker as host of Win, Lose or Draw. In the 2012 Christmas episode of The Sarah Millican Television Programme, Richie said that Daz gave him so much money for doing the adverts that he would have "snorted the stuff" if they had asked him.

=== Musicals and music career ===
Richie has had success in musicals, appearing in such musicals as Boogie Nights and the 1993 London revival production of Grease. He released two albums, The Album in 1997, and Once Around the Sun in 2000, to limited commercial response. Richie had a number 2 hit on the UK singles chart in 2003, with his Children in Need cover version of Wham!'s "I'm Your Man".

Over Christmas 2005, Richie appeared in a touring run of Scrooge: The Musical.

In 2009, Richie was reportedly scheduled as the opening act for Michael Jackson's concerts at The O2 Arena. The concerts were cancelled following Jackson's death.

During Christmas 2009, 2013 and 2014, Richie appeared as Aladdin, Buttons and Dick Whittington, in the pantomimes Aladdin, Cinderella and Dick Whittington at the Wycombe Swan Theatre in High Wycombe.

In 2017, Richie signed with East West Records and released his debut country music album, A Country Soul on 10 November 2017, which featured songs co-written by his son, Rixton member Jake Roche.

=== Television ===
Richie was a regular co-host alongside Derek Jameson on "Jameson Tonight", an early Sky One talk show in 1990.

In 1995, Richie began hosting the game show Lucky Numbers and starred in The Shane Richie Experience (1995–1996).

From 2002 to 2003, Richie played the villainous Danny Dexter on Night and Day. He won supporting roles in low-profile British films, beginning with Chris Barfoot's award-winning short comedy movie Dead Clean and then later Distant Shadow. In 2003, Richie was executive producer for the British film Shoreditch, in which he also appeared in a lead role. He invested a six-figure sum into the budget of the film, which ultimately made little profit.

In 2007, Richie starred in ITV drama The Good Samaritan, and Father Frank for BBC One. He also starred in the second series of Skins on Channel 4 as Bruce Gelcart, a lecherous college drama lecturer.

On 11 May 2008, Richie hosted a quiz show on Sky One called Don't Forget the Lyrics!, whereby contestants must finish off the lyrics to lines of popular songs in order to win money.

On 25 April 2008, he was due to be a guest on The Paul O'Grady Show, but due to Paul O'Grady falling ill, Richie stood in as host.

In February 2009, Richie starred in a revamp of the series Minder on Channel 5. Rather than a remake of the original, Richie starred as Archie Daley, the nephew of the character Arthur Daley from the original series, which ran from 1979 to 1994 on ITV.

On 26 July 2009, Richie appeared in a one-off television drama called Whatever It Takes playing a character called JJ Merrick who comes to the aid of a girl who wins a radio competition – and catapults her into stardom, thus giving her a new lease of life.

The BBC announced on 14 November 2011 that following Jimmy Savile's recent death, Jim'll Fix It would return for a one-off Christmas Special in December 2011, with Richie as host.

In January 2014, Richie presented one series of the BBC One game show Reflex, made by Objective Productions. In December 2014, Richie began hosting The National Lottery: Win Your Wish List, a new Saturday night game show. A second series began airing in February 2016.

Richie has guest-hosted numerous episodes of The One Show. Between 2015 and 2016, Richie presented the BBC One daytime game show Decimate.

In June 2015, it was announced that he would be appearing in an episode of Benidorm.

In 2019, Richie filmed Caravanning With Shane Richie for Channel 5.

In November 2020, it was announced that Richie would appear on the twentieth series of I'm a Celebrity...Get Me Out of Here. He finished in fourth place.

=== EastEnders ===
In 2002, Richie joined the cast of EastEnders as Alfie Moon, a humorous character in a programme which had been criticised for being too depressing. The role won him numerous awards, including the award for Best Male European Actor at the Rose d'Or festival and National Television Awards for Most Popular Actor in 2005, shortly before he and co-star Jessie Wallace left the programme on Christmas Day in 2005.

On 8 May 2008, he said in an interview with Digital Spy that he would love to return to EastEnders.

On 23 July 2009, Richie announced on The One Show that his character Alfie Moon would return to EastEnders. Following an absence of almost five years, Richie made his on-screen return to EastEnders on 21 September 2010.

As well as appearing in EastEnders, Richie also narrated three episodes for the documentary series EastEnders Revealed, a series that goes behind the scenes to explore characters and storylines; the episodes were "The Secret Mitchell" (2009) about Ronnie Mitchell and Danielle Jones, "Peggy Mitchell – Queen of the Vic" (2010) about Peggy Mitchell, and "Farewell Pat" (2012) about Pat Evans.

On 4 April 2015, it was announced that Richie would appear alongside Jessie Wallace in a six-part BBC One drama series, Redwater. In the spin-off, Kat and Alfie Moon visited Ireland as they put their past behind them. Speaking about the series, Richie commented: "Both Jessie and I are absolutely thrilled to be given this amazing opportunity. To have a whole drama focussed around Kat and Alfie is a huge honour for us both and we just can't wait to start filming.

Richie briefly reprised the role in 2018, with the character leaving once again in early 2019.

In July 2022, it was announced that Richie would reprise the role of Alfie again, returning to the soap in the autumn.

=== Film ===
In 2003, Richie produced and starred in the film Shoreditch, into which he had reportedly invested half a million pounds of his own money. The film received negative reviews and was not widely seen.

In 2006, Richie played a rat named Sid in the Aardman Animation film Flushed Away. He was subsequently seen in the UK stage tour of One Flew Over the Cuckoo's Nest as Randle McMurphy, and heard as a presenter on Virgin Radio, where he interviewed Tony Hadley of Spandau Ballet.

=== Stage ===
In July 2015, it was announced that Richie would star alongside his EastEnders co-star Jessie Wallace in The Perfect Murder at the Theatre Royal in February 2016.

Since 2016, Richie has appeared in pantomime as Robin Hood.

In 2019, Richie starred as retired drag queen Hugo Battersby/Loco Chanelle in the hit musical Everybody's Talking About Jamie at the Apollo Theatre. He then reprised the role for the 2020 UK tour, running until 2022, despite some COVID interruptions.

== Personal life ==
Richie married Coleen Nolan in 1990. They have two sons, Shane Roche Jr. (born 1988) and Jake Roche (born 1992). The couple divorced in 1999.

Richie married his second wife, Christie Goddard, in 2007. They have three children. In August 2026, it was reported that they had divorced the previous month.

In 2003, Richie released his autobiography Rags to Richie. In the book, he claims to have had sex with six girls in a chalet during his time as a Pontins Bluecoat, and says that he broke the law by orchestrating ticket touts outside the theatre where he was appearing in Grease. Richie also claims to have given free tickets to the touts, who went on to sell them at a large profit for Richie.

In July 2026, Richie was arrested and charged with drink-driving following an altercation with staff at a Tesco petrol station after they called the police over him vaping on the grounds.

=== Charity ===
Richie is patron of Shinfield Players Theatre, an amateur little theatre in Reading, Berkshire, taking the role from Anton Rodgers who died in 2007. He made his first appearance in the audience on 11 July 2009 for the Youth Group production of Disco Inferno.

Richie is patron of the UK's Huntington's Disease Association. He is also a patron of a charity called Cherry Trees, which provides respite care for children with disabilities.

In 2019, Richie admitted that he had to live in a squat when a job failed to happen. After the squat was raided by police, he ended up homeless and was cautioned by the police for vagrancy. Of the experience, Richie said "What I learnt almost 40 years ago has had, and will always have, a lasting effect on me."

== Filmography ==
=== Film ===
Year	Film	Role	Notes
1998	Dead Clean	Nicos Malmatakis	Short film
1999	Distant Shadow	Paul	
2001	Silent Soul	Chippy	Short film
2003	Shoreditch	Thomas Hickman	Also executive producer
2006	Flushed Away	Sid (voice)	
2010	Risen	Mike Barrett	
2011	The Reverend	Prince	
2013	Prisoners of the Sun	Kalfhani	

=== Television ===
Year	Title	Role	Notes
1978	Grange Hill	Schoolboy	Series 1; episode 1. Uncredited role
1985	Bergerac	Henry Hoffman's Bodyguard	Series 4; episode 8: "Sins of the Fathers". Uncredited role
1990	Up to Something!	Various roles	Episodes 1–7. Also writer
1992	Caught in the Act	Himself - Presenter	Episodes 1–12
1992–1994	Run the Risk	Himself - Presenter	Series 1 & 2; 42 episodes
1992, 1998	Noel's House Party	Sebastian	Series 1; episode 6, & series 7; episodes 12, 14 & 18
1993	Win, Lose or Draw	Himself - Guest	Series 4: episodes 21–25
1994	Win, Lose or Draw	Himself - Host	Series 5; 65 episodes
1995–1997	Lucky Numbers	Himself - Presenter	Series 1–3; 50 episodes
1995–1997	The Shane Richie Experience / Love Me Do	Himself - Presenter	Unknown episodes
1997	Knight School	Herbert Scrope	Series 1; episode 1: "The New Boy"
1997	CITV Awards	Baron Rockafella	Television films
1998	Macbeth	Porter	Television films
2000	Bob Martin	Himself	Series 1; episode 2: "Through the Keyhole"
2000	Burnside	Tony Shotton	Episodes 1–4
2002–2003	Night and Day	Dr. Danny Dexter	Series 3; 18 episodes
2002–2005, 2010–2016, 2018–2019, 2022–present	EastEnders	Alfie Moon	Regular role
2005	French and Saunders	Alfie Moon	Episode: "Christmas Celebrity Special"
2006	What We Did on Our Holiday	Nick Taylor	Television films
2007	The Good Samaritan	Brian Guest	Television films
2007	Robbie the Reindeer in Close Encounters of the Herd Kind	Trooper No.1 (voice)	Television films
2008	Skins	Bruce Gelcart	Series 2; episode 2: "Sketch"
2008	The Paul O'Grady Show	Himself	Guest presenter: 1 episode
2009	Minder	Archie Daley	Episodes 1–6
2009	Whatever It Takes	JJ Merrick	Television film
2009	New Tricks	Johnny Tevis	Series 6; episode 5: "Death of a Timeshare Salesman"
2010	71 Degrees North	Himself	Contestant
2010	East Street	Alfie Moon	Charity crossover between Coronation Street and EastEnders
2011	Jim'll Fix It	Himself	Presenter
2013–2015	Children in Need	Himself	Co-presenter
2014	Reflex	Himself	Presenter
2014–2016	The National Lottery: Win Your Wish List	Himself	Presenter
2015	We're Doomed! The Dad's Army Story	Bill Pertwee	Television film
2015–2016	Decimate	Himself	Presenter
2015–2020	The One Show	Himself	Guest presenter
2016	Moving On	Terry	Series 7; episode 1: "Taxi for Linda"
2016, 2018	Benidorm	Sammy Valentino	Series 8; episode 7, & series 10; episodes 4–7
2017	Kat & Alfie: Redwater	Alfie Moon	Main cast; 6 episodes
2018	Claude	Denzel Pedal (voice)	Series 1; episodes 1, 2 & 14
2018	Star Boot Sale	Himself - Narrator	Episodes 1–20
2019	Caravanning with Shane Richie	Himself - Presenter	Episodes 1–4
2020	I'm a Celebrity, Get Me Out of Here!	Himself - Contestant	Series 20; 20 episodes
2021	The Hit List	Himself - Contestant	Series 4; episode 1: "Celebrity Special 1"
2022	Tipping Point: Lucky Stars	Himself - Contestant	Series 8; episode 5
2026	Michael McIntyre's Big Show	Alfie Moon	1 episode

== Discography ==
- 1997 – The Album
- 2000 – Once Around the Sun
- 2017 – A Country Soul
