= Jeanne Mockford =

British actress (1926–2018)

- Born: 15 March 1926; Lewisham, London, UK
- Died: 16 November 2018 (aged 92); Denville Hall, London, UK
- Occupation: Actress

Jeanne Mary Mockford (15 March 1926 – 16 November 2018) was an English actress, probably best known as Senna the soothsayer in the British television 1969–70 comedy series Up Pompeii!.

She has made guest appearances in shows such as The Bill, Doctors, Bedsitcom, My Hero, Keeping Up Appearances, Last of the Summer Wine, The Mighty Boosh, and Casualty. She starred in Little Britain as Kenny Craig's mother, and appeared in the feature films Fourplay (2001) and Hellboy II: The Golden Army (2008).

Mockford later lived at Denville Hall, a retirement home for actors, where she was diagnosed with dementia. She died in November 2018 at the age of 92.

== Filmography ==
Year	Title	Role	Notes
2001	Fourplay	Miss Daniels	
2008	Hellboy II: The Golden Army	Bag Lady	
