= Trick or Treat (TV series) =

- Trick or Treat logo
- Genre: Comedy
- Created by: Channel 4
- Directed by: Ben Caron
- Presented by: Derren Brown
- Theme music composer: Will Slater
- Opening theme: Fire
- Ending theme: Fire (Unique)
- Composer: Martin Dance
- Country of origin: United Kingdom
- Original language: English
- No. of seasons: 2
- No. of episodes: 12

Production
- Executive producers: Derren Brown, Andrew O'Connor, Anthony Owen
- Producer: Simon Mills
- Production location: Liverpool
- Cinematography: Jeremy Hewson, Kevin White, Pete Rowe
- Editor: Tim Thompsett
- Camera setup: 3SIXTYMEDIA
- Running time: 30mins
- Production company: Objective Productions

Original release
- Network: Channel 4
- Release: 13 April 2007 – 6 June 2008

Trick or Treat is a British television show hosted by Derren Brown produced by Objective Productions and broadcast on Channel 4. The first episode was broadcast on 13 April 2007. The focus of the show is on one person selected from a pool of volunteers who responded to adverts in the national press to take part in the show. The experience the volunteer receives is decided by which card they choose. If they choose the card that says 'Trick' they receive a bad experience and if they choose the card that says 'Treat' they receive a good experience. This distinction is not always obvious, however: in Series 2, a participant's dark experience of being persuaded to (supposedly) kill a kitten was a 'treat' because of the positive attitude to life Derren believed she would consequently develop; similarly, a volunteer who chose a 'trick' was kidnapped, but had been taught escapology techniques which enabled her to easily escape.

Episodes of Trick or Treat are not preceded by Brown's usual claim that no actors or stooges were used in the filming of the shows. Indeed, some participants (such as the ambulance crew in the final episode of Series 1) are declared to be actors.

== Episode list ==
=== Series 1 ===
Series 1 of Trick or Treat began airing on 17 April 2007.

The cards that Brown used throughout this series of this show are deceptive as they are rotational ambigrams and can read either 'Trick' or 'Treat' depending on which way up Brown chooses to hold them, and thus the card chosen by the participant is irrelevant, in terms of the following events. The ambigram was designed by John Langdon. To break up the stories of each episode, the series also includes separate routines with celebrities and also footage from the USA where Brown has been able to use his anonymity to try out new stunts.

Episode air date	Trick or Treat?	Notes
13 April 2007	Trick	The subject is put into a catatonic trance in a photo booth in London, and - over the next 13 hours - is transported to Marrakesh, Morocco. He wakes up in a photo booth in the back of a cafe near the main square. Also featured in this episode are the League of Gentlemen (razor in a chocolate roll trick) and a phone trick in the US.
20 April 2007	Trick	The subject participates in a ventriloquism show where he becomes bound to the dummy. When the dummy is put in its trunk, the subject finds he cannot see. Also featured are the Chapman Brothers with Adrian Searle (an art critic for The Guardian) and Brown’s paying with paper routine in New York City.
27 April 2007	Treat	A novice elderly lady is taught how to read bluffs and play poker. After only one week’s practice, she takes part in a tournament with professional poker players and is beaten only by a fluked final hand. Also featured is Brown acting as a waxwork in Madame Tussauds and a trick to make an American lady think cars were different colours from what they were.
4 May 2007	Trick	The subject is first kidnapped in a London taxi cab and then becomes a street madman. Also featured is Martin Freeman and the ‘Wisdom of Crowds’ routine in the Emigrant Savings Bank, Lower Manhattan.
11 May 2007	Treat	The subject is taught to play the piano and gives a professional standard recital within weeks. Later it transpires that the subject had played piano earlier in her life, but Brown persuaded her to forget this, so that she could rediscover her lost joy of playing. Also featured is Simon Callow at Compton Verney House and Brown acting as a psychic waiter in New York.
18 May 2007	Trick	The subject is put into a trance and wakes up at the scene of a staged road traffic accident in which she sees herself dead in her car. She is unable to move her legs and the 'rescue personnel' do not respond to her presence. Also featured in this episode are the 'Prediction Bag' routine in Covent Garden and the 'Lying Car Salesmen' in the US.

=== Series 2 ===
Series 2 of Trick or Treat began airing on 2 May 2008.

The cards which Brown used in this series are not the ambigrams as used in Series 1, but are visually distinct 'Trick' and 'Treat' cards.

Episode air date	Episode Title	Trick or Treat?	Notes
2 May 2008	Quiz	Treat	The subject is taught a technique of speed learning, and spends a week scanning hundreds of books in preparation for a Night of the Champions pub quiz, in which he enters as the only solo participant and comes second only to two teams who tied for first place.
9 May 2008	Kitten	Treat	The subject is shown a kitten in a metal cage and told that it will be electrocuted if she presses a button. The subject would win £500 if she stays in the room for five minutes without killing the kitten. Derren's negative suggestion forces her to press the button at the last second. However, she finds the cat is still alive and thus wins the £500. The treat was that the subject would think back to the moment if she was ever being negative in future, and would then become a more positive person.
16 May 2008	Time	Treat	The subject, guest star David Tennant, appears to have the ability to time travel. Through hypnosis, he is taken back to 29 September 1938 and gives out facts that appear in a newspaper from the following day. He then predicts what a member of the public will draw on a card, twenty minutes beforehand. Finally, he performs automatic writing, predicting two news items which would appear three days later in The Guardian newspaper. It was mentioned in the episode that Tennant had applied to the programme in the same way any ordinary member of the public would.
23 May 2008	Escape	Trick	The subject is taught ancient techniques on how to get free from complicated, risky situations. Subsequently, the subject - with hands and feet tied - is inserted into a sack and thrown into a lake. The subject gets free. During the course of the show, Derren claims that the subject will be completely alone under the water, bar a stationary camera.
30 May 2008	Confidence	Treat	The subject is put through a round of speed dating, where his shyness and lack of confidence clearly hold him back. Derren then puts the subject through a series of exercises and visualizations to build the subject's confidence. The subject is then put through another round of speed dating, where many more women placed him on their "would like to meet again" list, and he even proactively begins dating one of the interested women. Over a month after the subject believes all of the filming has been completed, Brown tests the subject in a robbery.
6 June 2008	Superstition	—	All previous participants from the series returned, and were placed in a room with a counter and several objects, saying that they had to score 100 points within half an hour. However, the points were awarded randomly and not by any actions performed in the room, referring to Skinner's pigeon experiments. If they had realised that, they might have noticed there was a further element, and found the sign above them on the ceiling telling them that the doors were unlocked and £150,000 waiting for them if they went to get it, which they did not. In another part of the episode, a superstitious woman was tested on her beliefs by being made to walk on pavement cracks and under ladders, smash a mirror, etc. (causing her to comment on whether she would be killed on the way home), to see if it affected her luck in a following experiment, which it didn't. A caption at the end of the show said that the episode was dedicated to her memory, having been killed on the way home from filming, although a continuity announcer later revealed that it was a joke.
