= The Cube (British game show) =

British game show

- Also known as: The Million Pound Cube (2020)
- Created by: Adam Adler
- Presented by: Phillip Schofield
- Starring: Andrianna Christofi
- Voices of: Colin McFarlane
- Theme music composer: Nick Foster; Ken Bolam
- Country of origin: United Kingdom
- Original language: English
- No. of series: 11
- No. of episodes: 95

Production
- Production locations: Fountain Studios (2009–15); Television Centre, London (2020–21)
- Running time: 60–75 minutes (inc. adverts)
- Production companies: Objective Media Group; Wildcard Television (2020); Triple Brew Media (2021)

Original release
- Network: ITV
- Release: 22 August 2009 – 8 August 2015
- Release: 17 October 2020 – 23 December 2021

The Cube is a British television game show that aired on ITV from 22 August 2009 to 23 December 2021. It was hosted by Phillip Schofield.

The original series offered contestants the chance to win a top prize of £250,000 by completing challenges from within a 4m × 4m × 4m Perspex cube. The challenges involve physical and mental tasks including catching, throwing, estimation, reacting, memorisation, and balancing. Colin McFarlane provides the disembodied voice of The Cube, who explains the rules of the games.

The show ran from 2009 to 2015, before returning as The Million Pound Cube in 2020, and again under its original title in 2021.

== Format ==
=== Original series (2009–15) ===
The game is played by a single contestant within a transparent Perspex cube that measures 4 metres along each edge. The goal is to complete a series of seven games, each of which awards an increasing amount of prize money, before failing a total of nine times. Games are selected for each individual contestant before the show to test their mental and physical faculties in various ways. A typical episode consists of two contestants' games; depending on how successful the contestants are and on editing, a contestant's game may split across two episodes.

The contestant begins with 9 lives and loses one for every unsuccessful attempt at a game. The contestant must repeat the game until they either complete it or run out of lives; in the latter case, the game ends and all money is forfeited. When a contestant succeeds, they are shown a preview of the next game and can decide to either stop playing and keep their winnings or continue and risk the money. During a preview, the game is named and described by a male voice (provided by McFarlane) and demonstrated by "The Body," a woman dressed in a full-body jumpsuit and featureless metal mask. Her name is not stated on camera or listed in the credits.

Schofield occasionally comments on the difficulty that past contestants have had with a game and notes the average number of lives lost while playing it, in order to help the contestant decide whether to continue or stop. Friends and family members in the audience may offer advice on decision-making and techniques for playing the games. Certain games have specific restrictions added to increase their difficulty, such as a time limit or allowing the use of only one hand. If the contestant violates any such restriction, they immediately lose a life.

The contestant is given two forms of assistance, each of which may be used once. "Simplify" reduces the difficulty of a game, and may be used after any unsuccessful attempt. The exact nature of the change, such as by allowing more time or increasing the size of a target zone, is not revealed until the contestant chooses to use Simplify. The change remains in effect until the contestant either completes that game or runs out of lives. "Trial Run" allows the contestant to make one practice attempt at a game with no lives or money at stake, then decide if they want to play or stop. This assistance becomes available after they complete the first game, and can only be used upon the introduction of a new one.

The seventh and final game is worth a jackpot of £250,000; contestants who complete this game are said to have "beaten the Cube". It is a more difficult version of one of the six games a contestant previously played. In the original format, seven contestants have reached this level, with six choosing to stop and keep their winnings of £100,000. The seventh is runner Mo Farah, who successfully completed the final game on an episode of a 2012 celebrity series in which British gold medallist athletes competed for charity.

On Season 5 Episode 6 a player pulled out due to injury and chose to cashout without looking at the next game.

On 25 October 2020, model Andrianna Christofi was revealed as the portrayer of the Body during the original run of the programme.

=== Revival (2020–21) ===
On 15 June 2020, after five years off the air, Deadline Hollywood reported that The Cube would return with the jackpot being significantly increased. A month later, the return was confirmed, with the jackpot raised to £1,000,000 and Phillip Schofield returning as host.

The revival aired in 2020, renamed to The Million Pound Cube, with pairs of contestants taking part who have a pre-existing relationship. Some games involve only one contestant, while others involve both; in the former case, the team must decide which contestant will play the game once it is introduced. The "Trial Run" lifeline is replaced by a new one called "Swap," which allows the participant in a single-player game to swap places with their teammate. The seven-step money ladder is still used, with higher values at each step culminating in a top prize of £1 million. In the following series in 2021, the show returned to being known as simply The Cube, and the original money ladder was restored. Otherwise, the format remained the same as the previous series.

When a two-player game is introduced, it is demonstrated by two Bodies dressed in jumpsuits and masks as in the original version. While the original Body displayed collar-length brown hair behind her mask, however, these two wear hoods that cover the backs and sides of their heads so that all physical features except their hands are entirely hidden from view. In the revival format, a team have managed to beat the sixth game for the very first time, which became the eighth contestant to have a chance to attempt the jackpot but decided to walk away with £100,000.

In April 2022, ITV announced that The Cube was to be put on hiatus, with no immediate plans for a new series, but did not rule out future series being commissioned.

== Filming ==
Objective Productions first approached Channel 4 in 2008 with the format. It was made into a non-televised pilot by the channel, and was hosted by Justin Lee Collins. Channel 4 eventually decided not to commission the show because it would have been too expensive.

In February 2009, ITV purchased the rights to the show and filming began during April 2009 at Wembley's Fountain Studios. The Cube is one of the first shows to use the game freeze filming technique on a frequent basis, such as when a contestant jumps in celebration. The technique used is called "Bullet Time". Using specially designed cameras, it allows the viewer to see one side of the Cube before the action is frozen, spun to another face of the Cube, and then resumed. Slow-motion shots are again common to show action replays of the task a contestant just completed, or the critical moment of a game, to heighten the excitement of whether the contestant will succeed or fail.

The show makes extensive use of CGI to project images onto the walls and ceiling of the Cube, while a screen on the floor is also capable of showing images. These film techniques make the seemingly simple tasks that are put before the contestants seem much more exciting than they would normally be.

== Prize money ==
Originally, The Cube had a prize money structure starting at £1,000 and ending at the £250,000 jackpot; in the 2020 series, the jackpot was raised to £1,000,000.

Below is a breakdown of the prize money structure as used from Series 1–9, showing the game number and amount of prize money that can be won for successfully completing that game. If a player loses all their lives at any point, their game ends, and they leave with nothing. The only exception is for celebrities, playing for charity, in which £1,000 is awarded.

A different game is played at each of the first six levels; the seventh and final level was a game which contestants played before, but at a much higher difficulty level, such as decreased time or a smaller target area.

Stage	Game value	
Stage	Series 1–9, 11	Series 10
Game 1	£1,000	£2,000
Game 2	£2,000	£5,000
Game 3	£10,000	£10,000
Game 4	£20,000	£25,000
Game 5	£50,000	£100,000
Game 6	£100,000	£250,000
Game 7	£250,000	£1,000,000

== Transmissions ==
Series	Start date	End date	Episodes
1	22 August 2009	3 October 2009	7
2	19 September 2010	2 January 2011	12
3	3 April 2011	11 June 2011	9
4	30 October 2011	31 December 2011	9
5	14 April 2012	21 July 2012	8
6	23 December 2012	13 April 2013	8
7	20 April 2013	22 February 2014	8
8	1 March 2014	7 July 2014	9
9	3 June 2015	8 August 2015	8
10	17 October 2020	20 December 2020	8
11	28 August 2021	23 December 2021	9

== Ratings ==
=== Series 1 ===
Episode no.	Airdate	Viewers (millions)	ITV weekly ranking
1	22 August 2009	5.85	11
2	29 August 2009	5.12	11
3	5 September 2009	5.26	15
4	12 September 2009	5.06	15
5	19 September 2009	4.83	17
6	26 September 2009	4.81	20
7	3 October 2009	4.71	19

=== Series 2 ===
Episode no.	Airdate	Viewers (millions)	ITV weekly ranking
1	19 September 2010	4.98	15
2	26 September 2010	5.09	16
3	3 October 2010	5.78	16
4	10 October 2010	5.19	18
5	17 October 2010	5.21	20
6	24 October 2010	5.51	17
7	31 October 2010	5.21	18
8	7 November 2010	5.51	17
9	14 November 2010	5.53	19
10	21 November 2010	5.42	22
11	18 December 2010	3.92	22
12	2 January 2011	4.18	20

=== Series 3 ===
Episode no.	Airdate	Viewers (millions)	ITV weekly ranking
1	3 April 2011	3.64	22
2	10 April 2011	3.31	24
3	17 April 2011	3.32	23
4	24 April 2011	2.77	27
5	1 May 2011	3.50	24
6	8 May 2011	3.94	18
7	15 May 2011	4.02	17
8	22 May 2011	3.96	18
9	11 June 2011	3.35	22

=== Series 4 ===
Episode no.	Airdate	Viewers (millions)	ITV weekly ranking
1	30 October 2011	3.96	20
2	6 November 2011	4.00	20
3	13 November 2011	4.08	26
4	20 November 2011	4.06	23
5	27 November 2011	4.08	20
6	4 December 2011	4.09	21
7	11 December 2011	3.19	25
8	24 December 2011	4.96	16
9	31 December 2011	2.87	29

=== Series 5 ===
Episode no.	Airdate	Viewers (millions)	ITV weekly ranking
1	14 April 2012	3.99	14
2	21 April 2012	2.78	28
3	28 April 2012	2.82	25
4	5 May 2012	3.14	24
5	12 May 2012	3.00	30
6	2 June 2012	—N/a	—N/a
7	14 July 2012	3.07	24
8	21 July 2012	—N/a	—N/a

=== Series 6 ===
Episode no.	Airdate	Viewers (millions)	ITV weekly ranking
1	23 December 2012	3.01	25
2	2 March 2013	4.09	20
3	9 March 2013	4.08	18
4	16 March 2013	4.04	14
5	23 March 2013	4.71	14
6	30 March 2013	3.78	18
7	6 April 2013	3.95	17
8	13 April 2013	3.49	21

=== Series 7 ===
Episode no.	Airdate	Viewers (millions)	ITV weekly ranking
1	20 April 2013	3.15	25
2	27 April 2013	3.21	20
3	4 May 2013	2.97	27
4	11 May 2013	3.16	25
5	18 May 2013	3.27	20
6	30 June 2013	2.87	23
7	28 December 2013	3.96	20
8	22 February 2014	—N/a	—N/a

=== Series 8 ===
Episode no.	Airdate	Viewers (millions)	ITV weekly ranking
1	1 March 2014	3.67	19
2	8 March 2014	3.34	19
3	15 March 2014	3.64	17
4	22 March 2014	3.79	16
5	29 March 2014	3.42	17
6	5 April 2014	3.22	20
7	11 April 2014	2.95	26
8	28 June 2014	—N/a	—N/a
9	7 July 2014	2.23	27

=== Series 9 ===
Episode no.	Airdate	Viewers (millions)	ITV weekly ranking
1	3 June 2015	3.02	16
2	10 June 2015	2.63	17
3	17 June 2015	2.66	16
4	24 June 2015	2.57	19
5	1 July 2015	2.87	17
6	8 July 2015	2.79	16
7	1 August 2015	—N/a	—N/a
8	8 August 2015	2.32	21

== Awards ==
Year	Group	Award	Result
2010	Broadcast Awards	Best New Programme	Nominated
2010	Rose d'Or	Best Game Show	Nominated
2011	RTS Awards	Best Entertainment Show	Nominated
2011	Broadcast Awards	Best Entertainment Programme	Won
2011	BAFTA	Best Entertainment Craft Team	Won
2011	BAFTA	Best Entertainment Programme	Won
2012	BAFTA	Best Entertainment Craft Team	Won
2012	National Reality TV Awards	Best Game Show	Nominated
2012	TV Choice Awards	Best Game Show	Won
2012	Rose d'Or	Best Game Show	Nominated
2012	National Television Awards	Best Entertainment Programme	Nominated
2013	National Television Awards	Best Entertainment Programme	Nominated
2014	National Television Awards	Best Entertainment Programme	Nominated

== International versions ==
The format has been sold to international broadcasters. In the case of the Greek, Turkish and U.S. versions from 2010, only a pilot was ever made.

Below is a breakdown of the countries that have created their own versions along with other information including the Jackpot available and broadcast dates.

Most versions of The Cube aired until 2017 used a version of the British intro, for example in the Arab World, Chinese, German, Italian, Russian, Saudi Arabian, and Ukrainian versions, whilst the French and Spanish versions used custom-composed cues whilst maintaining the British music for the games. When the original British version returned, the Australian and Dutch versions also used the new intro, with the Dutch version adding new sound effects.

Legend:

Currently airing
No longer airing
Non-broadcast pilot

Country	Name	Host	Channel	Top prize	Premiere/air dates	Status
Arab World	The Cube	Dhaffer L'Abidine	Dubai TV	Dhs250,000	2 February – 27 April 2014	No longer airing
Australia	The Cube	Andy Lee	Network 10	AU$250,000	24 February – 14 April 2021	No longer airing
China	梦立方; Mèng lìfāng	Cheng Lei	Dragon TV	Prize (Note: For example, the prize of the first 5 games for the very first contestant were football boots, complete set of freestyle football equipments, freestyle football party, replacement of old home appliances and a freestyle football studio respectively.) or ¥250,000	13 May 2012 – 4 September 2013	No longer airing
France	Le Cube	Nagui	France 2	€50,000	1 July – 30 August 2013	No longer airing
Germany	The Cube – Besiege den Würfel!	Nazan Eckes	RTL	€250,000	29 April – 10 June 2011	No longer airing
Greece	O κύβος O kubos	Unknown	Mega Channel	€75,000	2010 (pilot rejected)	Non-broadcast pilot
Hong Kong	The Cube	Dee Ho	ViuTV	HK$250,000	2027	
Hungary	A Kocka	Nóra Ördög	TV2	10,000,000 Ft	23 November – 23 December 2015	No longer airing
Italy	The Cube – La Sfida	Teo Mammucari	Italia 1	€100,000	7 – 28 September 2011	No longer airing
Netherlands	The Cube	Gordon Heuckeroth	SBS6	€100,000	23 April – 11 June 2021	No longer airing
Portugal	O Cubo	Jorge Gabriel	RTP1	€30,000	16 May – 11 July 2010	No longer airing
Russia	Куб; Kub	Dmitry Kharatyan	Channel One	₽3,000,000	30 March – 30 November 2013	No longer airing
Saudi Arabia	المكعب; Al Moukaab	Faisal Al Issa	KSA 1	SR250,000	17 March – 8 July 2010	No longer airing
Spain	El Cubo	Raquel Sánchez Silva	Cuatro	€150,000	8 February – 14 August 2012	No longer airing
Spain	El Cubo	Raquel Sánchez Silva	Cuatro	€250,000	8 February – 14 August 2012	No longer airing
Turkey	Kup	Unknown	Kanal D	250,000 TL	2010 (pilot rejected)	Non-broadcast pilot
Ukraine	Куб; Kub	Maksim Chmerkovskiy	STB	250,000 ₴	21 November 2011 – 24 December 2012	No longer airing
Ukraine	Куб; Kub	Dmytro Tankovych	STB	500,000 ₴	26 August 2013 – 29 December 2014	No longer airing
United States	The Cube	Dwyane Wade	TBS	US$250,000	10 June 2021 – 30 July 2023	No longer airing

Note

The British version of The Cube was formerly simulcast in Ireland by Virgin Media One. It is broadcast in New Zealand on TV1, and in Australia on the Nine Network. Old series were broadcast in Bosnia and Herzegovina by RTRS, in Serbia by IQS Life and in Singapore by MediaCorp Channel 5. The American version of The Cube was previously broadcast in Hong Kong by ViuTV.

=== Filming locations ===
The German, Italian, Portuguese, Saudi Arabian, Spanish versions, and the 2010 American pilot of The Cube were filmed at The Fountain Studios in London using the British set and games. Other international versions have created their own studio sets. The Chinese version of the show was filmed at the Zhabei Gymnasium in Shanghai; the Ukrainian version of the show was filmed at the Antonov Serial Production Plant in Kyiv; the Russian version of the show was filmed at the Ostankino Technical Center in Moscow; the Arabian version was filmed at the Dubai Studio City in Dubai; the French version of the show was filmed in La Plaine Saint-Denis, near Paris and the 2021 American version was filmed in Atlanta.

== Top prize winners ==
Across all versions of the show, 8 contestants have won the final game and taken away the jackpot.

Country	Contestant(s)	Jackpot game	Jackpot won	Number of lives left	Date
Arab world	Hamad Al Yahmadi	Blind Shot	Dhs250,000	4	20 April 2014
China	Chen Kun	Extraction	¥250,000	3	22 July 2012 (Charity special)
China	Wu Jing	Tower	¥250,000	1	2 May 2013 (Charity special)
Portugal	Vítor Costa	Barrier	€30,000	5	30 May 2010
Ukraine	Andriy Serko	Rapid Fire	₴250,000	1	29 October 2012
United Kingdom	Mo Farah	Barrier	£250,000 (original series)	6	14 July 2012 (Charity special)
United States	Brian and Branden	Final Pathfinder	$250,000	4	16 July 2023

== Games ==
=== Board games ===
An electronic board game based on the series was made available in stores from November 2010. As of June 2011, the game has been discontinued by most main retailers. The game comes with an electronic handheld system featuring games such as Time Freeze and Stop Zone, as well as 9 balls- six 18mm blow moulded balls, 1 30mm EVA foam ball, 1 25mm hard ball and one 50mm hard ball. The balls are used for different reasons and the foam ball is used for most games with a ball. For Multisphere, all balls are used unless it is being played in a room with hard floors, in that case, eight balls are used. Tubes are used for almost every physical game for starting positions, voids, tubes, towers, and columns.

Other equipment in the board game are track pieces, discs, clips, z-shaped platform pieces, cannons, blocks, a ball flipper, a beam and card pieces, and a 7 cm x 7 cm x 7 cm plastic cube for playing a series of physical games. The cube is used to connect onto the cube platform for the electronic games. A reducer also comes with the cube to reduce the size of the open top of the cube. This is, in almost all games involving the cube, removed. Manyclassic games are here as well as new games such as Roller, Catch, Retrieval and Bounce.

=== Mobile games ===
Around the time of the release of the board game, a Game App version of the series was made available via the iTunes store for use on the iPod Touch, iPhone, and iPad. This app version originally featured 16 games from the series: Balance, Cylinder, Descent, Drop Zone, Focus, Multisphere, Perimeter, Precision, Quantity, Reaction, Revolution, Shatter, Stabilise, Stop Zone, and Time Freeze. The first update for the game came in April 2011 with Pulse added Another update for the game was made available in June 2011, adding a further free game, Succession, and making eight games available via in-app purchase in 2 "packs" Exact, Pathfinder, Totalise and Tower in Pack one and Invert, Composure, Calculate and Navigate in Pack two. A further update was made available in October 2011, adding a further free game, Axis. 2 further games followed in 2012, Eliminate in April, and Symmetry in October. In February 2013, Chase, which at that time had not been shown on TV, was made available. Almost a year later on 21 February 2014 Avoid was added. The most recent update came on 19 May 2014 when 4 games new games were made available via In-App Purchase. These new games were Reset, Plummet, Selection, and Tally all of which are new games from the most recent series. Following the show's revival in 2020, the app saw the first appearance of a two-player game: Circumvent, and a new 4 game pack featuring Cascade, Downfall, Loop, and Dual Stop. In March 2021, three new two-player games were added: Dual Extraction, Revolve, and Interchange. There are currently 42 games available to play in the App version.

=== Console game ===
On 16 November 2012, a Cube game was released on consoles for the first time. It was available on the Nintendo Wii, PlayStation 3 and Nintendo 3DS. On 1 December 2022, the game was released on Nintendo Switch. 33 games are playable in this version including two unseen new games: Flight Path (already played in international versions) and Retrace. If the Cube is beaten, Extreme Mode is unlocked, featuring more extreme versions of five popular games: Revolution, Pathfinder, Perimeter, Rebound, and Momentum.

=== The Cube Live ===
In August 2021, The Cube announced that The Cube Live on Manchester Arndale would open in February 2022, alongside Putters in Urban Playground, with a total of 12 Cube games.

In February 2024, a second location was announced in Canary Wharf, London. The standalone attraction opened in June 2024, with a total of 21 Cube games (3 Games are VIP)

In August 2025, a third location was announced, this time outside of the UK, in Chicago, USA. It is due to open in June 2026.
