= Decimate (game show) =

- Genre: Game show
- Presented by: Shane Richie
- Country of origin: United Kingdom
- Original language: English
- No. of series: 3
- No. of episodes: 75

Production
- Running time: 45 minutes
- Production company: CPL Productions

Original release
- Network: BBC One
- Release: 20 April 2015 – 28 October 2016

Decimate is a BBC game show that aired on BBC One from 20 April 2015 to 28 October 2016 and is hosted by Shane Richie.

== Gameplay ==
In each episode, a team consisting of three contestants can win up to £20,000 by answering questions correctly through four rounds. The money is represented on a "Golden Wall," which is divided into 10 columns that display rows of gold coins. Every column represents 10% of the total prize pot.

=== Rounds 1–3 ===
A different team member plays each of the first three rounds. The host gives 10 keywords, corresponding to the 10 questions that will be asked, and the team decides who will answer the questions. The other two members have 20 seconds to give them as much information on those words as possible. The questions are multiple-choice, each with three answer options. A correct answer lights up one column in bright gold and protects the money corresponding to it, while a miss "decimates" the prize pot, reducing it by 10% and draining all the coins out of one column.

The team is given five "pass-backs" and five "overrules" to use throughout these three rounds. If the playing member is unsure of the answer, they may use a pass-back to get advice from their teammates. Conversely, if these two believe that a given answer is incorrect, they may use an overrule to change it.

The pot begins at £20,000 in the first round, setting the value of each column at £2,000. After each round, the Golden Wall is reset and the remaining money is evenly divided among all 10 columns. (E.g. if a team misses two questions in Round 1, £16,000 is left in the pot and each column in Round 2 is worth £1,600.)

=== Final round ===
One last set of 10 keywords is presented, and the team decides who will play first on their behalf. The host begins to read open-ended questions on the first keyword, with no 20-second briefing from the teammates, and a clock begins to count down from two minutes once he finishes reading the first question. A correct answer advances to the next keyword, while a miss leads to a new question on the same one. If the contestant misses three questions in a row, the clock is stopped, the prize pot is decimated, and the remaining money is re-distributed among all 10 columns. That contestant must sit out for the rest of the round, and their place is taken by one of the other two, who begins on a replacement keyword for the one that was missed. Pass-backs and overrules may not be used in this round, and the prize pot is always rounded up to the nearest full pound if it contains a fraction of one after being decimated.

If time runs out or if all three members fail, the team leaves with nothing. If they complete all 10 columns, each member wins an equal share of the remaining money.

== Critical reception ==
Steve Finan of Sunday Post praised the show for upholding the true meaning of the word 'decimate', which is to reduce by one tenth and is of Latin origin; in Roman times a 'decimatio' was a punishment. Finan wrote that the word had "been suffering a lingering death" as a synonym for "damage, devastate, or ... destroy", leaving a "poorer" vocabulary with no word to "express a reduction of one in ten". Finan stated that he was "indebted" to the show's host for restoring the word's Roman use and called him a "swashbuckling warrior on the side of the grammatical good guys".

Ian K of the Carrick Gazette said that the show "was pleasant enough viewing, but it seemed to me to be one which lacked that 'something special' that really successful quiz shows have".

In addition, Hayden Woolley gave the show a mixed review; while he commended the choice of host, he criticized the complexity and slow pace of the game, facetiously noting how overpowering the wall was and giving an overall review of 3/5.

== Transmissions ==
Series	Start date	End date	Episodes
1	20 April 2015	22 May 2015	25
2	7 September 2015	9 October 2015	25
3	26 September 2016	28 October 2016	25

== International versions ==
A Spanish version of the show was produced by Spanish production company Veralia, and Shine France picked up the rights to remake the show in France.
