= Alphabetical (game show) =

British game show (2016–2017)

- Genre: Game show
- Presented by: Jeff Stelling
- Country of origin: United Kingdom
- Original language: English
- No. of series: 2
- No. of episodes: 30

Production
- Production location: Dock10 studios
- Running time: 60 minutes (inc. adverts)
- Production company: Gameface

Original release
- Network: ITV
- Release: 15 August 2016 – 27 October 2017

Related
- Pasapalabra; The Alphabet Game

Alphabetical is a game show that aired on ITV from 15 August 2016 to 27 October 2017, hosted by Jeff Stelling. It is largely based on the Spanish quiz show Pasapalabra, which itself was derived and iterated from the BBC panel show The Alphabet Game. In 2018, ITV announced that the show would not return for a third series.

== Gameplay ==
Three challengers and a champion take part on each episode. Contestants each start the game with 100 seconds to use in the final round and can earn more by correctly answering questions. During timed rounds, they may pass a question by saying "alphabetical".

=== First letter ===
Each contestant in turn has 60 seconds to answer as many questions as possible, with the correct answers all beginning with the same letter. The champion plays first, and a different letter is specified for each contestant. One second is added to the contestant's clock for every correct answer.

=== Last letter ===
Gameplay is identical to the first round, except that all of a contestant's correct answers will end with the same given letter.

=== Starting letters ===
A category is named, and each contestant is given a set of initials referring to a term that fits it. They are given a maximum of three clues, and have three seconds to respond after each clue. Solving the initials correctly on the first clue awards five seconds; on the second clue, three; and on the third clue, one. Two categories are played, with each contestant having one turn per category and the champion always playing first. At the end of the round, the challenger with the lowest total time on their clock is eliminated. If there is a tie for lowest time, a "first letter" tiebreaker question is played on the buzzer to determine who advances, with no seconds at stake.

=== Thirteen letters ===
Thirteen letters are selected at random and placed in alphabetical order. One toss-up question is asked on the buzzer for each letter in order, which serves as the first letter of its answer, except X, which can appear anywhere in the answer. Two seconds are awarded for each correct answer, while a miss freezes the contestant out of the next question. Once all 13 questions have been asked, the challenger with the lower score is eliminated. In case of a tie, a "first letter" tiebreaker is played as before.

=== Letter showdown ===
As of series two, the remaining challenger faces the champion in this round. The contestants choose one of ten letters and are asked a question whose answer starts with that letter. Each correct answer scores one point. The contestant with the higher score after five questions takes/retains the championship and advances to the final round; ties are broken in the champion's favour. If one contestant gains an insurmountable lead, the round ends immediately.

=== Final round ===
==== Series 1 ====
The contestants compete to answer separate sets of 26 questions, whose answers each start with a different letter from A to Z in order (with the exception of X, which can appear anywhere in the word). Only one contestant plays at any moment, using the time on their own clock; the opponent's clock is stopped. Both contestants start at A and advance one letter at a time, with the champion playing first. When a contestant either passes or gives an incorrect answer, control goes to the opponent, who resumes play on the letter after the one on which they last passed or missed. A contestant may return to a passed question only by playing through the entire alphabet to reach it again.

Each contestant stops playing when they either run out of time or complete all 26 questions in their own set. If one contestant runs out of time, the opponent continues answering questions alone and may still pass as often as desired, but the clock will no longer stop on a pass or miss. The first contestant to answer every question correctly wins a cash jackpot that starts at £5,000. A wrong answer at any time forfeits that contestant's chance at the jackpot. If neither contestant wins it, the one with more correct answers wins £250 and returns as champion, and the jackpot increases by £100 for each of that contestant's answers. Ties are broken in the champion's favour.

==== Series 2 ====
Only the winner of the letter showdown plays the final. The other rules are the same as the first series.

== Transmissions ==
Series	Episodes	Originally released	
Series	Episodes	First released	Last released
1	10	15 August 2016	26 August 2016
2	20	2 October 2017	27 October 2017
