= Jéssica de la Peña =

American journalist

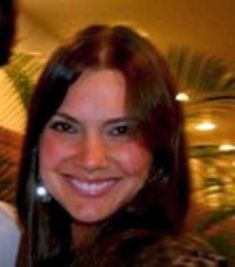
- Jéssica de la Peña
- Born: Jéssica Annais de La Peña Camargo; November 13, 1977 (age 48); New York City, U.S.
- Education: Social Communication and Journalism
- Occupations: Journalist, news reporter
- Years active: 22
- Notable credit: TVyNovelas Colombia Award
- Spouse: Ernesto Chalela (m. 2017)
- Children: 1

Jéssica Annais de la Peña Camargo (born November 13, 1977) is a Colombian television presenter and journalist.

== Biography ==
Jéssica Annais de La Peña Camargo was born in New York, and at the age of five she migrated to Barranquilla with her parents Ricardo de la Peña and Cecilia Camargo, and her sister. She completed her academic studies at the Colegio El Buen Consejo in Barranquilla, and graduated in Social Communication and Journalism from the Universidad del Norte, in the same city. Her most notable passions include dancing and singing. Her first casting for presenter she did in second half. At age 20, while in the second semester of her university career, she auditioned to enter a program at her university, but thanks to her excellent record in cameras, she entered the regional channel Telecaribe, where she first presented a variety program called La Noche and the Televista newscast. A year later, she was hired by Noticias RCN as presenter of the weekend editions, work that she alternated for seven months with her university studies and Telecaribe. After that time, she settled completely in Bogotá, where she went to present weekly broadcasts of the newscast. She transferred her career to the Javeriana University so as not to delay her studies in the last semester.

Her career has included:

- Televista News: The Regional News informs viewers of local, and international Caribbean national events,
- RCN News: She was anchorwoman of different editions of the newsreel between 1998 and 2016. In May, Jessica announced that she would travel to the United States to be a news correspondent for the RCN in New York and other cities of the country.
- The Night, by Telecaribe (1997)
- Televista News, by Telecaribe (1997–1998)
- RCN News (1998–present)
- Breakfast (2018–present)

== Personal life ==
Jessica had a relationship with a singer from Valledupar, Peter Manjarrés, from 2008 to 2010. She was the inspiration for his song, Tragao de tí. Their relationship did not last long.

In 2010, Jessica started a new relationship with an engineer called Andres Jaramillo. In April 2017, Jessica married businessman Ernesto Chalela. On September 19, 2017, he announced through Instagram the birth of his first daughter.
