= Objective Media Group =

Television production company

Objective Media Group Limited
- Objective Media Group's logo since 2016
- Formerly: Objective Productions Limited (1991–2016)
- Type: Subsidiary
- Industry: Television production
- Genre: Comedy, entertainment, factual entertainment, documentary
- Founded: April 9, 1992; 34 years ago
- Founder: Andrew O'Connor
- Headquarters: London, United Kingdom
- Parent: All3Media (2007–2026); Banijay UK (2026–present)
- Divisions: OMG America; OMG North; OMG Scotland
- Subsidiaries: Objective Entertainment; Objective Fiction; Coming Up Roses; Tannadice Pictures
- Website: objectivemedia.group

Objective Media Group Limited (OMG), previously known as Objective Productions Limited, is a media production company that is a subsidiary of Banijay UK, in turn to be a division of Banijay Entertainment, and consists of several individual production labels that create scripted dramas, comedies, reality, and factual entertainment programmes for UK and international broadcasters. It develops and produces entertainment, reality, factual, and scripted programming including The Cube, Lingo, The Gold, Feel Good, Peep Show, Fresh Meat, and Toast of London. The company has offices in London, Manchester, Glasgow, Scotland and Los Angeles, California.

Objective has won a number of awards including BAFTA, RTS Awards, British Comedy Awards, Rose d'Or, Monte Carlo Golden Nymphs and the South Bank Show.

== History ==
Objective Media Group Limited was incorporated on 9 April 1992 as Objective Productions Limited by Andrew O'Connor.

On 15 August 2007, British independent powerhouse group All3Media acquired Objective Productions in order to expand its TV production and distribution.

On 24 September 2015, Objective announced that they would undergo a creative restructure.

On 17 December 2015, Objective announced that they had launched a factual entertainment label with Deborah Sargeant in which it was named Second Star Productions. However, on 22 April 2022, after the departure of Deborah Sargeant, the founder of Second Star Productions, Objective Media Group folded its factual entertainment label Second Star Productions into All3Media's fellow production subsidiary Betty TV.

On 6 January 2016 following the establishment of Objective Productions' factual entertainment label Second Star Productions a month prior in December 2015, Objective Productions launched a second production label which its an entertainment subsidiary entitled Panda Television with Objective Productions appinted former Wall to Wall Media exeuctive Moira Ross to head Panda Television as the role of CCO. Two weeks later on the 22nd of that month, Objective Productions partnered with former head of Objective's comedy production state & former BBC in-house comedy executive Ben Farrell (who had returned to Objective after leaving to join the BBC back in 2014) to launch a new comedy production label that would handle all of Objective's comedy production state while Ben Farrell would head up Objective's new comedy label under the role of CCO, while Objective Productions' comedy team Charlie Lewis and Kelly McGolpin had become core producers of the newly launch production label and Joe McVey became Development Executive of Objective Fiction; the new comedy label would soon be named Objective Fiction.

On 20 May 2019, Objective Media Group had established its then-unnamed creative production label based in Manchester with former BBC executives Pam Cavannagh and Dympna Jackson would head up Objective's new unnamed creative production outfit as co-presidents; the name for Obejctive's new Manchester-based creative production label would later be named Purple Productions.

In June 2020, Objective Media Group teamed up with Neil Forsyth to form a new production label under Objective's comedy production division Objective Fiction called Tannadice Pictures that would produce all of Neil Forsyth's upcoming programming state.

In August 2022, Objective Media Group's parent All3Media had merged its production subsidiairy Maverick Television UK into Objective Media Group's Glasgow-based Scottish production division Objective Media Group Scotland as the latter's parent Objective had formed a new production label based in OMG Scotland's Glasgow office named 141 Productions alongside a London office with Toby Stevens, head of OMG's Scottish division OMG Scotland, and Maverick Television UK’s Creative Director Hannah Brownhill would run the new production label

On 18 January 2023, Objective and its parent company All3Media announced that they had sold producer Main Event Media, which was founded by Jimmy Fox in 2017, to Religion of Sports in an exclusive production deal with the latter now being a production arm under the former.

In May 2024, Objective Media Group consolidated two of its unscripted production labels which were London-based gameshow & unscripted entertainment label Triple Brew Media and factual & lifestyle programming label Betty TV (also based in London, which Obejctive Media Group's parent All3Media acquired it from Discovery (now Warner Bros. Discovery) in 2017) as Objective Media Group had the two production labels merged alongside their production states into a new then-untitled unscripted entertainment production label. One month later on 26 June of that year following the merger Objective Media Group's two production labels Betty TV and Triple Brew Media into forming one then-untitled unscripted entertainment label, Objective Media Group had named the new unscripted entertainment production label Objective Entertainment with its parent appointed Neale Simpson to head the parent's new unscripted entertainment outfit Objective Entertainment under the role of managing director whilst Betty TV joint creative director Helen Cooke joining the new label Objective Entertainment as creative director.

Four months later in September of that year following Objective naming its new unscripted label as Objective Entertainment back in May, Objective Media Group's new unscripted production studio Objective Entertainment had taken over the unscripted production state such as The Only Way Is Essex and Celebs Go Dating from All3Media's fellow production subsidiary Lime Pictures (whom Objective had previously produced Fresh Meat with them) when Lime Pictures had shuttered its London production office as Rebecca Kenny-Smith who formerly headed Lime's London office joined Objective Entertainment to head the production takeover of the brands.

In July 2026 when Objective Media Group's parent All3Media had merged with French international production/distrobution group Banijay Entertainment in that same month, Objective Media Group had closed its Manchester-based factual and game show entertainment production label Purple Productions after seven years.

== Companies ==
Part of Banijay UK, Objective Media Group is led by Layla Smith and is composed of the following companies:

- Objective Entertainment (Powerhouse unscripted label set up in 2024, developing and producing the next generation of channel-defining formats in the UK and internationally.)
- Objective Fiction (scripted comedies and comedy-dramas)
  - Tannadice Pictures (joint venture with Neil Forsyth)
- OMG America (Los Angeles, California, American division)
- OMG North (Manchester, England, run by Pam Cavannagh and Dympna Jackson)
- OMG Scotland (Glasgow, nations hub)
- Coming Up Roses (Launched in March 2023 Coming Up Roses is led by Oliver Wright, focusing on developing and producing high quality and strong rating factual series and documentaries.)

== Filmography ==
Title	Years	Network	Notes
The Alphabet Game	1996–1997	BBC One	co-production with BBC North
Meet the Challenge	1998	BBC One	
Extreme Magic, Extreme Danger	2000	ITV	co-production with LWT
Secrets of Magic	2003–2005	BBC Two	
Peep Show	2003–2015	Channel 4	
19 Keys	2003	Channel 5	co-production with Crook Productions
Bedsitcom	2003	Channel 4	
Balls of Steel	2005–2008	Channel 4	
Star Stories	2006–2008	Channel 4	
The Real Hustle	2006–2012	BBC Three	co-production with Crook Productions
Trick or Treat	2007–2008	Channel 4	
Dogface	2007	E4	
The Peter Serafinowicz Show	2007–2008	BBC Two	
The Kevin Bishop Show	2008–2009	Channel 4	
The Justin Lee Collins Show	2009	ITV2	
Reggie Perrin	2009–2010	BBC One	
The Cube	2009–2021	ITV	co-production with Triple Brew Media
Derren Brown: The Events	2009	Channel 4	
Robert's Web	2010	Channel 4	co-production with That Mitchell & Web Co.
Pete versus Life	2010–2011	Channel 4	
John Bishop's Britain	2010–2011	BBC One	co-production with 3 Amigos
Tool Academy	2011-2012	E4	
Fresh Meat	Channel 4	2011–2016	co-production with Lime Pictures
Mr & Mrs Hotty Hot Show	2011	E4	
The Mad Bad Ad Show	2012	Channel 4	
Operation Ouch!	2012–present	CBBC	as Objective Media Group Scotland continued from Maverick Television
Face the Clock	2013	Channel 4	as Objective Productions Scotland
Big Bad World	2013	Comedy Central	
Relfex	2014	BBC One	
Bad Robots	2014–2015	E4	
Killer Magic	2015	BBC Three	as Objective Productions Scotland
Beat the Brain	2015	BBC Two	co-production with Over the Top Productions
King of the Nerds	2015	Sky One	co-production with Electus
Make Me a Millionaire Inventor	2015–2016	CNBC	as Objective Productions USA co-production with All3Media America
Thief Trackers	2015–2017	BBC One	co-production with Crook Productions
Tricks of the Restaurant Trade	2016–2019	Channel 4	as Objective Media Group Scotland co-production with Betty
Culinary Genius	2017	ITV	co-production with Studio Ramsay
Last Commanders	2018–2019	CBBC	Originally titled Fear Falls; as Objective Media Group Scotland; co-production with Panda Television (season 1)
Flirty Dancing US	2019–2020	Fox	as Objective Media Group America co-production with All3Media America and Second Star Productions
Saving Our Nurses	2020	BBC One	as Objective Media Group North; co-production with Betty
12 Dates of Christmas	2020–2021	HBO Max	as Objective Media Group America co-production with All3Media America
Lingo	2021–present	ITV1	as Objective Media Group North co-production with Objective Entertainment
The Answer Trap	2021	Channel 4	as Objective Media Group Scotland co-production with Triple Brew Media and Motion Content Group
The Cube USA	2021	TBS	as Objective Media Group America co-production with All3Media America and 59th & Prairie Entertainment
The Larkins	ITV1	2021–2022	as Objective Media Group Scotland co-production with Objective Fiction and Genial Productions
Gordon Ramsay's Future Food Stars	2022–2023	co-production with Studio Ramsay Global	
The Great American Recipe	2022–present	PBS	as Objective Media Group America co-production with VPM Media Corporation
Alan Carr's Picture Slam	2023–present	BBC One	as Objective Media Group Scotland co-production with Objective Entertainment

== Objective Fiction ==
Objective Fiction is a specialized television production label under the Objective Media Group that focuses on creating original scripted comedy and drama content for UK and international broadcasters. Headed by Ben Farrell, the label operates in both the UK and North America.

It was formed on 22 February 2016, when Objective Media Group partnered with former head of Objecitve's comedy production state & former BBC in-house comedy executive Ben Farrell, who had returned to Objective after leaving to join the BBC back in 2014, to launch a new comedy production label, which was named Objective Fiction a month later in March, that would handle all of Objective's comedy production state while Ben Farrell would head up Objective's new comedy label under the role of CCO while Objective Productions' comedy team Charlie Lewis and Kelly McGolpin had become core producers of the newly launch production label and Joe McVey became Development Executive of Objective Fiction.

In June 2021, Objective Fiction signed a first look partnership with Mae Martin to produce & develop scripted programming with Objective Fiction would produce them with Mae Martin.

=== Productions ===
Title	Years	Network	Notes
Toast of London	2013–2022	Channel 4/BBC Two	Known as Toast of Tinseltown; Took over production from Objective Productions for series 4; co-production with Wiip
GameFace	2014–2019	Channel 4/E4	Took over production from Objective Productions
The Larkins	2021–2022	ITV1	co-production with Objective Media Group Scotland and Genial Productions
Wayward	2025	Netflix	co-production with Sphere Media

== Current productions ==
- Britain Today Tonight
- GameFace
- Is OJ Innocent? The Missing Evidence
- It Was Alright in the 70s
- Now You See It
- Stupid Man, Smart Phone
- United Shades of America
- Witless

== Past productions ==
- 30 Greatest Political Comedies
- 50 Funniest Moments
- Bad Robots
- Balls of Steel
- Balls of Steel: The Stars Of The Future
- Bedsitcom
- Big Bad World
- The Bulls**t Detective
- Celebrity Bedlam
- David Walliams: Awfully Good
- Death Wish Live
- Derren Brown: Behind The Mischief
- Derren Brown: Enigma
- Derren Brown: The Events
- Derren Brown: The Gathering
- Derren Brown: The Heist
- Derren Brown: Hero at 30,000 Feet
- Derren Brown: Messiah
- Derren Brown: Mind Control
- Derren Brown: Miracles for Sale
- Derren Brown: Mind Reader – An Evening of Wonders
- Derren Brown Presents The 3D Magic Spectacular
- Derren Brown: Russian Roulette
- Derren Brown: Séance
- Derren Brown: Something Wicked This Way Comes
- Derren Brown: The System
- Derren Brown: Trick of the Mind
- Derren Brown: Trick or Treat
- Dogface
- Don't Get Screwed
- Doorstep Crime 999
- Extreme Cuisine (formerly Gastronuts)
- Great Movie Mistakes 2
- Great TV Mistakes
- The Greatest Ever 3D Moments
- The Greatest Xmas Adverts
- The Greatest Xmas Moments of All Time
- Help my Teacher is Magic
- The Incredible Mr. Goodwin
- John Bishop’s Britain
- The Justin Lee Collins Show
- Kabadasses (Comedy Lab)
- The Kevin Bishop Show
- Killer Magic
- Meet The Parents
- The Most Shocking Celebrity Moments of 2010
- Mother of Invention
- Peep Show
- Pete versus Life
- The Peter Serafinowicz Show
- Police Academy UK
- The Quick Trick Show
- The Real Hustle
- Reflex
- Reggie Perrin
- Robert's Web
- Science of Attraction
- Science of Scams
- Secret Removers
- Star Stories
- TNT Show
- Tom and Jenny
- Tool Academy UK
- Tricks of the Bible
- Tricks of the Tradesmen
- TV Heaven, Telly Hell
- The Undercover Princes
- The Undercover Princesses
