= Cilla Black discography =

- Studio albums: 16
- Extended plays: 5
- Compilation albums: 11
- Singles: 45
- Reworked albums: 1
- Remix albums: 1

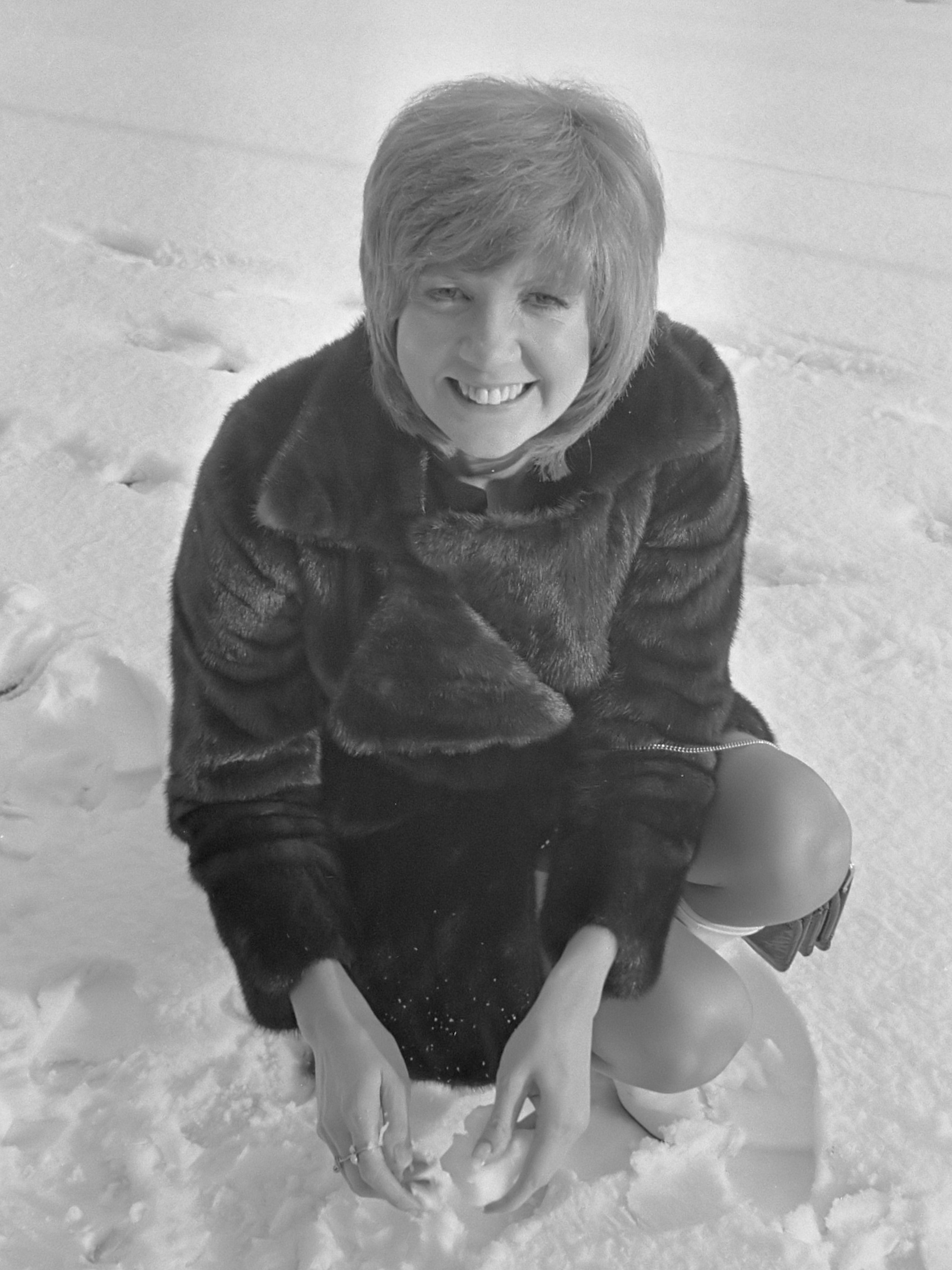
Cilla Black in 1970

This discography is a list of singles and albums released by Cilla Black in her career.

== Albums ==
=== Studio albums ===
Title	Album details	Peak chart positions
Title	Album details	UK
Cilla	Released: 25 January 1965; Label: Parlophone; Formats: LP, reel-to-reel	5
Is It Love?	Released: March 1965; Label: Capitol; Formats: LP; US-only release	—
Cilla Sings a Rainbow	Released: 18 April 1966; Label: Parlophone; Formats: LP, reel-to-reel	4
Sher-oo!	Released: 1 April 1968; Label: Parlophone; Formats: LP, reel-to-reel	7
Surround Yourself with Cilla	Released: 23 May 1969; Label: Parlophone; Formats: LP, reel-to-reel	—
Sweet Inspiration	Released: 3 July 1970; Label: Parlophone; Formats: LP, MC	42
Images	Released: May 1971; Label: Parlophone; Formats: LP, MC	—
Day by Day with Cilla	Released: January 1973; Label: Parlophone; Formats: LP, MC, 8-track	—
In My Life	Released: 7 June 1974; Label: EMI; Formats: LP, MC, 8-track	—
It Makes Me Feel Good	Released: March 1976; Label: EMI; Formats: LP, MC	—
Modern Priscilla	Released: June 1978; Label: EMI; Formats: LP, MC	—
Especially for You	Release date: August 1980; Label: K-tel; Formats: LP, MC	—
Surprisingly Cilla	Release date: 7 October 1985; Label: Towerbell; Formats: LP, MC	—
Cilla's World	Release date: 12 November 1990; Label: Virgin; Formats: CD, LP; Initially only released in Australia	—
Through the Years	Release date: 20 September 1993; Label: Columbia; Formats: CD, LP, MC	41
Beginnings: Greatest Hits & New Songs	Release date: 22 September 2003; Label: EMI; Formats: CD	68
"—" denotes releases that did not chart or were not released in that territory.

=== Reworked albums ===
Title	Album details	Peak chart positions
Title	Album details	UK
Cilla (with the Royal Liverpool Philharmonic Orchestra)	Released: 16 November 2018; Label: Parlophone; Formats: CD, digital download	26

=== Remix albums ===
Title	Album details
Beginnings: Revisited	Released: 3 August 2009; Label: EMI; Formats: digital download

=== Compilation albums ===
Title	Album details	Peak chart positions		
Title	Album details	UK	AUS	NZ
The Best of Cilla Black	Released: November 1968; Label: PARLOPHONE; Formats: LP	21	—	—
You're My World	Released: November 1970; Label: Starline; Formats: LP, MC	—	—	—
The Very Best of Cilla Black	Released: January 1983; Label: Parlophone; Formats: LP, MC	20	51	—
1963–1973: The Abbey Road Decade	Released: 15 September 1997; Label: Zonophone; Formats: 3xCD	—	—	—
The 35th Anniversary Collection	Released: 3 August 1998; Label: EMI Gold; Formats: CD	—	—	—
Cilla: The Best of 1963–78	Released: 26 May 2003; Label: EMI; Formats: 3xCD	—	—	—
The Definitive Collection (A Life in Music)	Released: 3 August 2009; Label: EMI; Formats: 2xCD+DVD	—	—	—
Completely Cilla: 1963–1973	Released: 23 April 2012; Label: EMI; Formats: 5xCD+DVD, digital download	—	—	—
The Very Best of Cilla Black	Released: 14 August 2013; Label: Parlophone; Formats: CD+DVD, digital download	1 (Note: Reached peak in 2015 following the death of Black.)	50	1
The Hit Singles	Release date: 30 October 2015; Label: Varèse Vintage; Formats: CD; US-only release	—	—	—
Her All-Time Greatest Hits	Release date: 27 October 2017; Label: Parlophone; Formats: CD, digital download	—	—	—
"—" denotes releases that did not chart or were not released in that territory.

== EPs ==
Title	EP details	Peak chart positions
Title	EP details	UK
Anyone Who Had a Heart	Released: April 1964; Label: Parlophone; Formats: 7"	5
It's for You	Released: October 1964; Label: Parlophone; Formats: 7"	12
Cilla's Hits	Released: September 1966; Label: Parlophone; Formats: 7"	6
Time for Cilla	Released: September 1968; Label: Parlophone; Formats: 7"	—
Cilla Black	Released: October 1977; Label: EMI; Formats: 7"	—
"—" denotes releases that did not chart.

== Singles ==
Single (A-side, B-side) (Note: A-side and B-side configurations refer to UK releases (unless otherwise indicated). A-sides and B-sides may differ in other territories.) Both sides from same album except where indicated.	Year	Peak chart positions									Album
Single (A-side, B-side) Both sides from same album except where indicated.	Year	UK	AUS	CAN	GER	IRE	NL	NZ	SWE	US	Album
"Love of the Loved" b/w "Shy of Love"	1963	35	72 (Note: "Love of the Loved" did not chart in Australia until 1965.)	—	—	—	—	—	—	—	Non-album singles
"Anyone Who Had a Heart" b/w "Just for You"	1964	1	34	12	37	1	—	1	15	—	Non-album singles
"You're My World" b/w "Suffer Now I Must"	1964	1	1	24	—	2	—	2	18	26	Non-album singles
"It's for You" b/w "He Won't Ask Me"	1964	7	17	—	—	—	—	—	—	79	Non-album singles
"You've Lost That Lovin' Feelin'" b/w "Is It Love?"	1965	2	15	—	—	—	—	—	—	—	Non-album singles
"Is It Love?" (Note: "Is It Love?" was only released as a single in the US and Canada. Included on the North American Is It Love? album.) b/w "One Little Voice" (from Cilla)	1965	—	—	—	—	—	—	—	—	133	Non-album singles
"I've Been Wrong Before" b/w "I Don't Want to Know"	1965	17	81	—	—	—	—	—	—	—	Non-album singles
"Love's Just a Broken Heart" b/w "Yesterday"	1966	5	27	—	—	10	20	15	—	—	Cilla Sings a Rainbow
"Alfie" b/w "Night Time Is Here"	1966	9	22	96	—	—	—	20	—	95	Non-album singles
"Don't Answer Me" b/w "The Right One Is Left"	1966	6	22	—	—	—	—	—	—	—	Non-album singles
"A Fool Am I" b/w "For No One"	1966	13	—	—	—	—	—	—	—	—	Non-album singles
"What Good Am I?" b/w "Over My Head"	1967	24	66	—	—	—	—	—	—	—	Non-album singles
"I Only Live to Love You" b/w "From Now On"	1967	26	—	—	—	14	—	—	—	—	Non-album singles
"Step Inside Love" b/w "I Couldn't Take My Eyes Off You"	1968	8	86 (Note: "Step Inside Love" initially peaked at number 95 upon release in 1968; however, it peaked at number 86 when released as an EP in 1969.)	97	—	15	—	12	—	—	Sher-oo!
"Where Is Tomorrow?" b/w "Work Is a Four Letter Word"	1968	39	—	—	—	—	—	—	—	—	Non-album single
"What the World Needs Now Is Love" (Note: "What the World Needs Now Is Love" was only released as a single in the US and Canada.) b/w "Only Forever Will Do" (from Surround Yourself with Cilla)	1968	—	—	—	—	—	—	—	—	—	Sher-oo!
"Only Forever Will Do" (Note: "Only Forever Will Do" was only released as a single in Australia and New Zealand.) b/w "Follow Me"	1968	—	95	—	—	—	—	—	—	—	Surround Yourself with Cilla
"Surround Yourself with Sorrow" b/w "London Bridge" (Non-album track)	1969	3	24	—	—	5	—	5	16	—	Surround Yourself with Cilla
"Conversations" b/w "Liverpool Lullaby" (from Surround Yourself with Cilla)	1969	7	36	—	—	5	—	2	—	—	Non-album singles
"If I Thought You'd Ever Change Your Mind" b/w "It Feels So Good"	1969	20	53	—	—	19	—	7	—	—	Non-album singles
"I Can't Go On Living Without You" (Note: "I Can't Go On Living Without You" was only released as a single in New Zealand.) b/w "From Both Sides Now"	1970	—	—	—	—	—	—	—	—	—	Sweet Inspiration
"Across the Universe" (Note: "Across the Universe" was only released as a single in Australia, New Zealand, Japan and the Netherlands.) b/w "Words" (from Surround Yourself with Cilla)	1970	—	—	—	—	—	—	14	—	—	Sweet Inspiration
"The April Fools" (Note: "The April Fools" was only released as a single in Japan.) b/w "I Can't Go On Living Without You"	1970	—	—	—	—	—	—	—	—	—	Sweet Inspiration
"Child of Mine" b/w "That's Why I Love You"	1970	—	—	—	—	—	—	—	—	—	Non-album single
"Oh Pleasure Man" (Note: "Oh Pleasure Man" was only released as a single in Germany.) b/w "Your Song" (from Images)	1971	—	—	—	—	—	—	—	—	—	Sweet Inspiration
"Faded Images" (Note: "Faded Images" was only released as a single in New Zealand and Sweden.) b/w "Sad Sad Song"	1971	—	—	—	—	—	—	15	—	—	Images
"Something Tells Me (Something's Gonna Happen Tonight)" b/w "La La La Lu"	1971	3	61	—	—	3	—	13	16	—	Non-album singles
"The World I Wish for You" b/w "Down in the City"	1972	51 (Note: Chart position is from the official UK "Breakers List".)	—	—	—	—	—	—	—	—	Non-album singles
"You, You, You" b/w "Silly, Wasn't I?"	1972	—	—	—	—	—	—	—	—	—	Non-album singles
"Baby We Can't Go Wrong" b/w "Someone"	1974	36	—	—	—	—	—	—	—	—	In My Life
"I'll Have to Say I Love You in a Song" b/w "Never Run Out (Of You)"	1974	51	—	—	—	—	—	—	—	—	In My Life
"He Was a Writer" b/w "Anything You Might Say"	1974	—	—	—	—	—	—	—	—	—	Non-album singles
"Alfie Darling" b/w "Little Bit of Understanding"	1975	—	—	—	—	—	—	—	—	—	Non-album singles
"I'll Take a Tango" b/w "To Know Him Is to Love Him"	1975	—	—	—	—	—	—	—	—	—	It Makes Me Feel Good
"Little Things Mean a Lot" b/w "It's Now"	1976	—	—	—	—	—	—	—	—	—	Non-album singles
"Fantasy" (Note: "Fantasy" was only released as a single in the US.) b/w "It's Now"	1976	—	—	—	—	—	—	—	—	—	Non-album singles
"Easy in Your Company" b/w "I Believe (When I Fall in Love It Will Be Forever)"	1976	—	—	—	—	—	—	—	—	—	Non-album singles
"I Wanted to Call It Off" b/w "Keep Your Mind on Love" (from Modern Priscilla)	1977	—	—	—	—	—	—	—	—	—	Non-album singles
"Silly Boy" b/w "I Couldn't Make My Mind Up"	1978	—	—	—	—	—	—	—	—	—	Modern Priscilla
"The Other Woman" b/w "Opening Night"	1978	—	—	—	—	—	—	—	—	—	Modern Priscilla
"There's a Need in Me" b/w "You've Lost That Lovin' Feelin'" (re-recording)	1985	—	—	—	—	—	—	—	—	—	Surprisingly Cilla
"Surprise, Surprise" b/w "Put Your Love Where Your Heart Is"	1985	—	—	—	—	—	—	—	—	—	Surprisingly Cilla
"Through the Years" b/w "Through the Years" (orchestral version; non-album track)	1993	54	—	—	—	—	—	—	—	—	Through the Years
"Heart and Soul" (with Dusty Springfield) b/w "A Dream Come True"	1993	75	—	—	—	—	—	—	—	—	Through the Years
"You'll Never Walk Alone" (with Barry Manilow) b/w "Through the Years"	1993	—	—	—	—	—	—	—	—	—	Through the Years
"—" denotes releases that did not chart or were not released in that territory.
