= Cilla All Mixed Up =

Remix album by Cilla Black
- Released: 7 September 2009
- Genres: Pop, dance
- Label: EMI
- Producer: Stephen Munns

Cilla Black chronology
Beginnings: Revisited (2009)	Cilla All Mixed Up (2009)

Singles from Cilla All Mixed Up
- 1. "Something Tells Me (Almighty Mix)" Released: September 2009

Cilla All Mixed Up is Cilla Black's sixteenth and final solo album, released worldwide on 7 September 2009 by EMI to digital download. The album was conceived to celebrate Black's 45th year in the music business. An array of original hit singles and album tracks held at Abbey Road studios were given a club makeover alongside a few more recent songs taken from Black's last studio album Beginnings (2003). The project features contributions from production team Almighty as well as other club DJs from the UK, Middle East and Asia. The lead single for the album project was the Almighty mix of "Something Tells Me".

== Track listing ==
1. "Step Inside Love [Almighty Radio Edit]" (John Lennon, Paul McCartney) – 3:43
2. "Something Tells Me [Almighty Mix]" (Roger Greenaway, Roger Cook) – 7:28
3. "Anyone Who Had a Heart [Almighty Mix]" (Burt Bacharach, Hal David) – 6:21
4. "Baby We Can’t Go Wrong [Almighty Radio Edit]" (Jimmy Dunning) – 3:38
5. "I Don't Know How to Love Him [David Lee Marks Radio Edit]" (Andrew Lloyd Webber, Tim Rice) – 4:11
6. "Beautiful Goodbye [Klubkidz Extended Mix]" (Jennifer Hanson, Kim Patton Johnston) – 5:42
7. "Faded Images [Tommy Sandhu's Ram Mix]" (Kenny Lynch, Tony Hicks) – 3:56
8. "Kiss You All Over [Tommy Sandhu's Big Bill Mix]" (Mike Chapman, Nicky Chinn) – 5:01
9. "A Fool Am I (Dimmelo Parlami) [Marley M Remix]" (Flavio Carraresi, Alberto Testa, Peter Callander) – 7:08
10. "Your Song [Pookadelic Remix]" (Elton John, Bernie Taupin) – 6:53
11. "Step Inside Love [DJ Ronstar - Step In Da Club Mix]" (Lennon, McCartney) – 5:18
12. "Something Tells Me [Dan Thomas Club Mix]" (Greenaway, Cook) – 6:41

Bonus tracks on the 2018 double CD Cilla All Mixed Up (2009) / Beginnings: Revisited (2009):
13. "Black Paper Roses [Chicken Feed Remix]" (Belle Gonzalez) – 2:57
14. "Imagine [Matt Pop Club Mix]" (John Lennon) – 4:21

== Credits ==
Personnel

- Lead vocals by Cilla Black
- Produced by Stephen Munns
- Executive producer: Robert Willis
