= Beginnings: Greatest Hits & New Songs =

2003 compilation album by Cilla Black

Studio album by Cilla Black
- Released: 22 September 2003
- Recorded: 2003 (New Recordings)
- Genre: Pop
- Label: EMI
- Producer: Ted Carfrae

Cilla Black chronology
Through the Years (1993)	Beginnings: Greatest Hits & New Songs (2003)	Beginnings: Revisited (2009)

Professional ratings
Review scores
Source	Rating
AllMusic	3.5/5 stars

Beginnings: Greatest Hits & New Songs is the fifteenth and final solo studio album by Cilla Black. The project features eleven all-new studio recordings produced by Ted Carfrae alongside nine of Black's own hit singles produced by George Martin. Also included as a hidden track is a club remix of a re-recording of "Step Inside Love", produced by DJ Tommy Sandhu (which had been a No. 3 UK Club Hit).

The album was a minor hit in the UK charts, peaking at No. 68, and staying in the top 75 for one week.

== Track listing ==
1. "Anyone Who Had a Heart" [2003 Remaster] (Burt Bacharach, Hal David) – 2:51
2. "Kiss You All Over" (Mike Chapman, Nicky Chinn) – 4:03
3. "Step Inside Love" [2003 Remaster] (John Lennon, Paul McCartney) – 2:22
4. "If You Could Read My Mind" (Gordon Lightfoot) – 3:39
5. "Beginnings" (Burt Bacharach, Hal David) – 3:53
6. "Beautiful Goodbye" (Jennifer Hanson, Kim Patton Johnston) – 4:11
7. "Surround Yourself with Sorrow" [2003 Remaster] (Bill Martin, Phil Coulter) – 2:37
8. "Imagine" (with Cliff Richard) (John Lennon, Yoko Ono) – 3:39
9. "Let There Be Love" (Ian Grant, Lionel Rand) – 2:30
10. "Conversations" [2003 Remaster] (Jerry Lordan, Roger Cook, Roger Greenaway) – 4:10
11. "It's for You" [2003 Remaster] (John Lennon, Paul McCartney) – 2:21
12. "This Kiss" (with Cliff Richard) (Beth Nielsen Chapman, Robin Lerner, Annie Roboff) – 3:17
13. "My Man (You've Changed My Tune)" (Cynthia Webb, Vini Poncia) – 3:30
14. "Alfie" [2003 Remaster] (Burt Bacharach, Hal David) – 2:39
15. "Something Tells Me (Something's Gonna Happen Tonight)" [2003 Remaster] (Roger Greenaway, Roger Cook) – 2:28
16. "Photograph" (with Cliff Richard) (Richard Starkey, George Harrison) – 3:51
17. "I've Been Wrong Before" (2003 version) (Randy Newman) – 3:41
18. "You've Lost That Lovin' Feelin'" [2003 Remaster] (Phil Spector, Barry Mann, Cynthia Weil) – 3:09
19. "You're My World" [2003 Remaster] (Umberto Bindi, Gino Paoli, Carl Sigman) – 2:57
20. "Anyone Who Had a Heart" (Late Night version) [Re-Recording] (Burt Bacharach, Hal David) – 9:37
21. "Step Inside Love" (All Burnt Out Mix) [Re-Recording] (Hidden Track) (John Lennon, Paul McCartney) – 4:31

Beginnings: Revisited

Studio album by Cilla Black
- Released: 3 August 2009
- Recorded: 2003; 2009 (New Mixes)
- Genre: Pop
- Label: EMI
- Producer: Ted Carfrae

Cilla Black chronology
Greatest Hits & New Songs (2003)	Beginnings: Revisited (2009)	Cilla All Mixed Up (2009)

== Re-release ==
The album was released on digital download in 2008 shortly after the CD was deleted.

On 3 August 2009, EMI Records released a repackaged edition of the album exclusively to digital download. This re-issue entitled Beginnings: Revisited excludes all the hit singles which are otherwise available and presents solely the 2003 recordings with many previously unreleased bonus tracks. A digital booklet containing all-new cover album artwork, detailed track information was available from iTunes with purchases of the entire album re-issue.

== Track listing ==
1. "Kiss You All Over" [2009 Mix] (Mike Chapman, Nicky Chinn) – 4:17
2. "Imagine" (backing vocals by Cliff Richard) [2009 Mix] (John Lennon, Yoko Ono) – 3:39
3. "Beautiful Goodbye" [2009 Mix - Full Version] (Jennifer Hanson, Kim Patton Johnston) – 4:34
4. "Let There Be Love" [2009 Mix] (Ian Grant, Lionel Rand) – 2:29
5. "Beginnings" [2009 Mix] (Burt Bacharach, Hal David) – 3:56
6. "This Kiss" [2009 Mix - Extended Version] (Beth Nielsen Chapman, Robin Lerner, Annie Roboff) – 3:34
7. "My Man (You've Changed My Tune)" [2009 Mix] (Cynthia Webb, Vini Poncia) – 3:32
8. "If You Could Read My Mind" [2009 Mix] (Gordon Lightfoot) – 3:35
9. "I've Been Wrong Before" [2009 Mix] (Randy Newman) – 3:40
10. "Photograph" [2009 Mix] (Richard Starkey, George Harrison) – 3:54
11. "Anyone Who Had a Heart" [Late Night Version - 2009 Mix] (Burt Bacharach, Hal David) – 4:50
12. "Step Inside Love" [All Burnt Out Mix] (John Lennon, Paul McCartney) – 4:31
13. "Kiss You All Over" [2009 Acoustic Mix] (Mike Chapman, Nicky Chinn) – 4:09
14. "Imagine" [2009 Acoustic Mix] (John Lennon, Yoko Ono) – 3:24
15. "Beautiful Goodbye" [2009 Klubkidz Remix - Radio Edit] (Jennifer Hanson, Kim Patton Johnston) – 3:58
16. "Imagine" [2009 Orchestral Mix] (John Lennon, Yoko Ono) – 3:27
17. "My Man (You've Changed My Tune)" [2009 Alternate Mix] (Cynthia Webb, Vini Poncia) – 3:32
18. "Beautiful Goodbye" [2009 Stripped Down Mix] (Jennifer Hanson, Kim Patton Johnston) – 3:53

== Personnel ==
- Lead vocals by Cilla Black
- Produced by Ted Carfrae (tracks: 2, 4, 5, 6, 8, 9, 12, 13, 16, 17, 20 on Beginnings: Greatest Hits and New Songs, all tracks on Beginnings: Revisited)
- Produced by George Martin (tracks: 1, 3, 7, 10, 11, 14, 15, 18, 19 on Beginnings: Greatest Hits and New Songs)
- Produced by DJ Tommy Sandhu (track 21 on Beginnings: Greatest Hits and New Songs)
- Album cover photograph by Nicky Johnston
