= Is It Love? (album) =

Studio album by Cilla Black
- Released: 1965
- Recorded: Abbey Road Studios, London
- Genre: Pop, Merseybeat, Soul
- Length: 28:47
- Label: Parlophone/EMI
- Producer: George Martin

Cilla Black chronology
Cilla (1965)	Is It Love? (1965)	Sher-oo! (1968)

Is It Love? is Cilla Black's 1965 first US album (Capitol (S)T 2308). Originally the ballad "Is It Love?", written by her manager and future husband, Bobby Willis, was recorded for the Ferry Cross the Mersey LP and film of the same name. Instead, it became the title track of her first and only album for Capitol Records.

== Track listing ==
A1 Is It Love? – Willis 2:56
A2 I'm Not Alone Anymore - Westlake, Lynch 2:22
A3 You've Lost That Lovin' Feelin' - Spector, Mann, Weil 3:06
A4 Goin' Out Of My Head - Randazzo, Weinstein 2:13
A5 What'cha Gonna Do About It - Payne, Carroll 2:34
A6 You'd Be So Nice To Come Home To - Cole Porter 2:22
B1 Love Letters - Victor Young 3:15
B2 Love Is Like a Heat Wave - Holland, Dozier, Holland 2:08
B3 Ol' Man River - Jerome Kern, Oscar Hammerstein II 2:20
B4 This Empty Place – H. David, B. Bacharach 2:40
B5 Anyone Who Had A Heart - H. David, B. Bacharach 2:51
