= Cilla (2014 TV series) =

UK TV miniseries

- Third episode title card
- Genre: Drama
- Written by: Jeff Pope
- Starring: Sheridan Smith; Aneurin Barnard; John Henshaw; Melanie Hill; Ed Stoppard
- Composer: Niall Byrne
- Country of origin: United Kingdom
- Original language: English
- No. of series: 1
- No. of episodes: 3

Production
- Executive producers: Jeff Pope; Robert Willis; Tony Moulsdale
- Producer: Kwadjo Dajan
- Running time: 45–47 minutes
- Production companies: ITV Studios and GroupM Entertainment

Original release
- Network: ITV
- Release: 15 September – 29 September 2014

Cilla is a British drama serial about the early career of Cilla Black. It was broadcast in three parts on ITV, and began on 15 September 2014 with Sheridan Smith playing the starring role. Smith was highly praised for her performance.

Following Cilla Black's death in August 2015, the series was broadcast again on ITV between 4–6 August 2015, as well as repeats on ITV Encore.

== Plot ==
The series is based around Black's hometown of Liverpool and follows her rise to fame from 1960 amateur appearances in clubs, her relationships with Bobby Willis and Brian Epstein to the latter's death in 1967.

=== Episode 1 (15 September 2014) ===
In 1960s Liverpool, young Priscilla "Cilla" White is working as a typist, but frequently performs at Liverpool's famed Cavern Club, where she meets young singer-songwriter Bobby Willis. Mersey Beat, a local music publication, prints an article on Cilla in which she is mistakenly referred to as "Cilla Black". However, young Cilla likes the sound of it and decides to use if for her stage name. It is arranged for her to audition for the Beatles' manager Brian Epstein. However, she gets a bad case of nerves and the song's key is too low for her, and she loses ground to her rival, Beryl Marsden.

=== Episode 2 (22 September 2014) ===
Three years later, Cilla's confidence returns after her disastrous audition. Bobby urges her to give singing another go, and Brian Epstein gives Cilla another chance to audition by inviting her into the studio to record what would become her debut single, Love of the Loved. The song fails to break the Top 30, but Brian then insists that Cilla change direction and take a gamble on a cover of a Dionne Warwick ballad entitled Anyone Who Had a Heart. The gamble pays off and Anyone Who Had a Heart shoots straight to the top of the charts.

=== Episode 3 (29 September 2014) ===
Cilla follows up Anyone Who Had a Heart with a second consecutive number one, You're My World. However, she fails in her subsequent bid to corner the American market and tempers flare in her blossoming relationship with Bobby who is beginning to feel sidelined as Cilla's ego causes her to force Bobby to turn down his own recording contract. In the meantime Brian Epstein's life is unraveling as The Beatles begin to scale back on their activities and eventually to drift apart, and Epstein, a closeted homosexual, continually seeks young men to rough him up and he lies to Cilla about how he suffered his bruises. Epstein develops a dependency on sleeping pills with tragic repercussions as he overdoses on the pills and dies. By his bed is a contract for Cilla to star in her own series. Cilla, distraught about Brian's death, signs the contract and Cilla debuts on the BBC in January 1968. Cilla later marries Bobby, and the drama ends with a photo of the real Cilla and Bobby on their wedding day in 1969.

== Cast ==
Character	Episode 1	Episode 2	Episode 3
Cilla Black	Sheridan Smith	Sheridan Smith	Sheridan Smith
Bobby Willis	Aneurin Barnard	Aneurin Barnard	Aneurin Barnard
Brian Epstein	Ed Stoppard	Ed Stoppard	Ed Stoppard
Johnny Hutchinson	Danny Burns	Danny Burns	
John Lennon	Jack Farthing		Jack Farthing
Paul McCartney	Kevin Mains		Kevin Mains
Ringo Starr	Tom Dunlea		Tom Dunlea
George Harrison	Michael Hawkins		Michael Hawkins
John White	John Henshaw	John Henshaw	John Henshaw
Priscilla White	Melanie Hill	Melanie Hill	Melanie Hill
Pauline	Gemma Brodrick-Bower	Gemma Brodrick-Bower	
Rose	Debbie Brannan	Debbie Brannan	Debbie Brannan
Trevor	Shaun Mason	Shaun Mason	
George Martin		Elliot Cowan	Elliot Cowan
Rory Storm	Jamie Muscato	Jamie Muscato	
Robert Willis Sr.	Andrew Schofield	Andrew Schofield	Andrew Schofield
Adrian Barber	Jordan Luke Gage	Jordan Luke Gage	
Pat	Tara Wells	Tara Wells	
Vera	Kate Fitzgerald	Kate Fitzgerald	
Elsie Starkey	Mary Duffy		
Teddy		Tommy McDonnell	Tommy McDonnell
Degsy	James Nelson-Joyce	James Nelson-Joyce	
Kenny	Kent Riley	Kent Riley	Kent Riley
Jean	Samantha Robinson	Samantha Robinson	
Ted "Kingsize" Taylor	Nic Greensheilds	Nic Greensheilds	

== Production ==
ITV announced the three-part series on 16 February 2014. Filming began in Liverpool in March 2014.

For the role, Smith had to learn the two singing voices that Black used, a loud belt she originally used to make herself heard in the noisy Cavern Club and a softer one she used in a recording studio.

== Locations ==
Several locations in Liverpool were used.

- The offices of Liverpool Film Office stood in for the Cavern Club interior, with the Cavern's exterior represented by the Elude Bar and Restaurant on Porter Street.
- Cilla's family home at 380 Scotland Road (now demolished) was filmed in Holt Road, Kensington (exterior scenes), and the Belgrave pub in Bryanston Road in Aigburth (interior scenes).
- The family homes of Bobby Willis' (Anfield) and Ringo Starr's mother ("Welsh Streets", Aigburth) were represented by houses on Southwood Road.
- The scene showing Bobby running late to work was filmed on Everton Brow, with the 1960s Liverpool skyline recreated by CGI.
- The cast was variously filmed "wandering down Yates Street in Dingle, past the Cross Keys pub off Old Hall Street and drinking at Ye Cracke on Rice Street".
- Scenes filmed on the other side of the Mersey on the Wirral included the marriage of Bobby’s brother Kenny in Wallasey Town Hall (representing Liverpool Register Office), and beach scenes at Perch Rock in New Brighton.
- The Adelphi hotel was used for several settings, first as the Kenilworth Hotel in London where Cilla and Bobby met Brian Epstein, then another hotel that they visit following Cilla's London Palladium appearance. Subsequently it represented the Persian Room of New York's Plaza Hotel and also the Blackpool hotel in which Cilla stayed.
- Oh Me, Oh My! in Water Street served as the location for the Scotch of St James club scenes and also a New York nightclub.
- Scenes set in Cilla's London flat were filmed in Elmsley Road in Mossley Hill.
- Sound, Food & Drink on Duke Street in Liverpool, served as a location for where Bobby first introduces himself as Cilla's manager and negotiates her fee.

== Awards ==
Year	Group	Award	Nominee	Result
2015	National Television Awards	Drama Performance	Sheridan Smith (for Cilla)	Won
2015	National Television Awards	Drama	Cilla	Nominated
2015	British Academy Television Awards	Best Actress	Sheridan Smith (for Cilla)	Nominated
2015	British Academy Television Awards	Best Mini-Series	Cilla	Nominated
2015	British Academy Television Awards	Radio Times Audience Award	Cilla	Nominated
2015	TV Choice Awards	Best Actress	Sheridan Smith (for Cilla)	Won
2015	TV Choice Awards	Best New Drama	Cilla	Nominated
2015	Royal Television Society Programme Awards	Best Actress	Sheridan Smith (for Cilla)	Nominated
2015	Royal Television Society Craft & Design Awards	Costume Design - Drama	Amy Roberts	Won
2015	Royal Television Society Craft & Design Awards	Effects - Digital	Tanvir Hanif, Paul Senior	Nominated
2015	Royal Television Society Craft & Design Awards	Production Design - Drama	Lisa Hall	Nominated
2015	International Emmy Awards	Best Actress	Sheridan Smith (for Cilla)	Nominated

== Reception ==
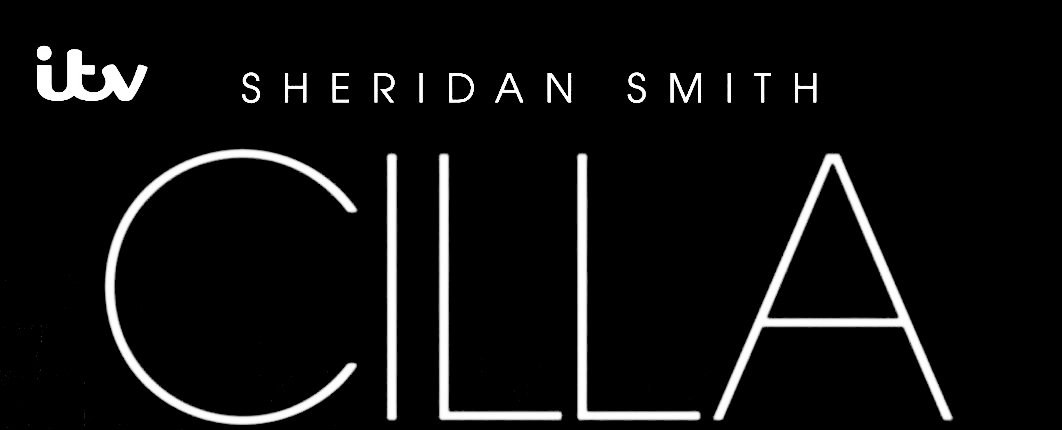

Cilla received critical acclaim and led to Cilla Black re-entering music charts at number 46.

The Telegraph wrote: "Smith sang her heart out, catching perfectly the bluesy belter within the girl next door, but rather than rushing her to fame, the action unfolded slowly enough to show her falling at the first hurdle as she became crippled with nerves singing for Brian Epstein. A drama this good, with Smith in sparkling form, knows it can take its time to flourish."

The Guardian wrote: "The third, and best, reason why Cilla is so watchable is Sheridan Smith. It's one of those extraordinary performances, like Julie Walters as Mo Mowlam, when an actress does more than play a real character; she becomes her, to the extent that it's hard for the viewer not to forget they're not actually watching a young Cilla Black. She sounds like her, too. I'd be interested to know what someone more qualified to judge (an actual Liverpudlian) thinks, but to me she utterly convinces as a Scouser, while some of the others don't. Also, the singing, which she does herself, is brilliant. And even when the singing isn't brilliant, she still is."

== Ratings ==
Episode #	Ratings (in millions) Sourced by BARB; figures include ITV +1 and ITV HD broadcasts
1	8.601
2	8.203
3	8.214

The 8.6 million rating achieved for the first episode made the programme one of the most popular dramas to be shown on UK television in 2014

== Home media ==
The series was released on DVD on 6 October 2014.

== Stage musical ==
Bill Kenwright and Laurie Mansfield produced a stage musical adaptation of the series with a script by Jeff Pope, who wrote the TV series, which began touring the UK from September 2017 starring Kara Lilly Hayworth as Cilla. The production was scheduled to tour again from September 2020 with Sheridan Smith reprising the role of Cilla from the TV series, however it was cancelled due to the COVID-19 pandemic.
