= Cilla (1968 TV series) =

British television entertainment programme (1968–1976)

- Genre: Music & Light Entertainment
- Created by: Bill Cotton
- Written by: Ronnie Taylor; Talbot Rothwell; Eric Sykes
- Directed by: Michael Hurll; Brian Whitehouse; Vernon Lawrence; Ray Lakeland
- Presented by: Cilla Black
- Opening theme: "Step Inside Love" "Something Tells Me (Something's Going To Happen Tonight)" "Baby, We Can't Go Wrong" "It's Now"
- Country of origin: United Kingdom
- Original language: English
- No. of series: 8
- No. of episodes: 69

Production
- Producers: Michael Hurll; James Moir; Colin Charman
- Production locations: BBC Television Theatre, London
- Running time: 35–50 minutes

Original release
- Network: BBC1
- Release: 30 January 1968 – 17 April 1976

Cilla is a BBC television programme hosted by British singer Cilla Black. It ran for eight series from 30 January 1968 to 17 April 1976. From series three onwards, the shows were produced and broadcast in colour.

== History ==
The British singing star Cilla Black was offered her own show on the BBC, the eponymous Cilla, by Bill Cotton in 1967. Cotton was then Assistant Head of Light Entertainment. The first series of the show started broadcasting on Tuesday, 30 January 1968, on the first show of which Black's guest was Tom Jones and the two music stars sang a duet together. Paul McCartney (without Lennon) wrote the theme tune entitled "Step Inside Love", which became another chart success for Black (this song was later covered by Madeline Bell). The series featured guest appearances by many stars of the era, including Henry Mancini, Johnny Mathis, Andy Williams, Charles Aznavour, Matt Monro, Sacha Distel, Donovan, Georgie Fame, Ethel Merman, the Shadows and Phil Everly.

This success paved the way for a lengthy television career for Black, which continued until 2003. Black began the 1970s by appearing on the BBC's highly rated review of the sixties music scene Pop Go The Sixties, performing "Anyone Who Had a Heart" on the show, broadcast across Europe and BBC1, on 31 December 1969. Black had not been able to appear in the studio with the other artists due to ill health, so her contribution was represented by a clip taken from her eponymous TV series shown in November 1969.

Like many of her contemporaries during the 1970s, Black's musical career later declined. She toured often, but became increasingly thought of as a television personality. Her BBC series Cilla ran for almost a decade, with eight seasons between January 1968 and April 1976. The theme songs from the Cilla series were also successful. "Step Inside Love" opened the series for the runs for the first four series from 1968 to early 1971 and reached number 8 in the UK singles chart on its release. "Something Tells Me (Something's Gonna Happen Tonight)" was the theme for the late 1971 and 1973 shows, reaching number 3 and becoming Black's last top ten success. "Baby, We Can't Go Wrong" was used for the 1974 series and was a minor success, reaching number 36, Black's last UK chart hit until 1993. The final series in 1976 used the song "It's Now", which was included as a B-Side of "Little Things Mean A Lot", which failed to chart.

The UK's Eurovision Song Contest entry selection process was part of the Cilla show in 1968 and 1973, when Black's close friend Cliff Richard was the featured artist performing all the songs shortlisted in the A Song For Europe segment. Black had been asked to sing for the 1968 contest, but declined because she thought it unlikely that another British female vocalist would win after Sandie Shaw, who had won the previous year. She was asked again in 1969 to represent the UK in 1970, but declined, as she was pregnant at the time. The 1974 series was also scheduled to feature the 'Song for Europe' process, but Black was uncomfortable at promoting another female singer (Olivia Newton-John) each week throughout the series' run, and in a rather last-minute decision, the BBC agreed to move the process to another series: Clunk Click, As It Happens, hosted by Jimmy Savile.

An episode broadcast in March 1968 was found by a fairground owner whose father was a film collector; it was shown at Missing Believed Wiped on 16 December 2017.

== Episodes ==
=== Series 1 (1968) ===
Produced by Michael Hurll. Broadcast Tuesdays on BBC1 at 8:00 pm. Theme Song: "Step Inside Love".

No. overall	No. in series	Title	Directed by	Written by	Original release date
1	1	Episode 1	Michael Hurll	Ronnie Taylor	30 January 1968
A weekly show starring Cilla Black. Guest star: Tom Jones. Special guests: Harry H. Corbett, Jimmy Edwards and Roy Castle. Featuring The Irving Davies Dancers and The Ladybirds. Musical director: Harry Rabinowitz.
2	2	Episode 2	Michael Hurll	Ronnie Taylor	6 February 1968
A weekly show starring Cilla Black. Guest star: Ringo Starr. Special guests: Spike Milligan, Harry Secombe and members of 'The Four Musketeers' cast. Featuring the Irving Davies Dancers and The Ladybirds. Musical director: Harry Rabinowitz.
3	3	Episode 3	Michael Hurll	Ronnie Taylor	13 February 1968
A weekly show starring Cilla Black. Guest star: Frankie Vaughan. Special guest: Donovan. Featuring The Irving Davies Dancers and The Ladybirds. Musical director: Harry Rabinowitz.
4	4	Episode 4	Michael Hurll	Ronnie Taylor	20 February 1968
A weekly show starring Cilla Black. Guest star: Dickie Henderson. Special guests: Ray Fell and Lulu. Featuring The Irving Davies Dancers and The Ladybirds. Musical director: Harry Rabinowitz.
5	5	Episode 5	Michael Hurll	Ronnie Taylor	27 February 1968
A weekly show starring Cilla Black. Guest star: Matt Monro. Special guest: Russ Conway. Featuring The Irving Davies Dancers and The Ladybirds. Musical director: Harry Rabinowitz.
6	6	"A Song For Europe 1968"	Michael Hurll	Ronnie Taylor	5 March 1968
A weekly show starring Cilla Black with Cliff Richard singing the six finalists in A Song for Europe 1968. Backing vocals by The Breakaways. Orchestra conducted by Norrie Paramor.
7	7	Episode 7	Michael Hurll	Ronnie Taylor	12 March 1968
A weekly show starring Cilla Black with Cliff Richard singing the winning song chosen by viewers as A Song for Europe 1968. Backing vocals by The Breakaways. Orchestra conducted by Norrie Paramour. Special guest star: Sandie Shaw. Guest stars: Terry Scott, Hugh Lloyd and Mike Yarwood. Featuring The Irving Davies Dancers and The Ladybirds. Musical director: Harry Rabinowitz.
8	8	Episode 8	Michael Hurll	Ronnie Taylor	19 March 1968
A weekly show starring Cilla Black. Guest star: Frankie Howerd. Special guests: Norman Vaughan and Scott Walker. Featuring The Irving Davies Dancers and The Ladybirds. Musical director: Harry Rabinowitz.
9	9	Episode 9	Michael Hurll	Ronnie Taylor	26 March 1968
A weekly show starring Cilla Black. Guest star: The Dudley Moore Trio. Special guests: Roy Hudd and Freddie Davies. Featuring The Irving Davies Dancers and The Ladybirds. Musical director: Harry Rabinowitz.
10	--	"Show Of The Week"	Michael Hurll	Ronnie Taylor	16 June 1968
Cilla's show on BBC1 earlier this year was the most successful spring variety series with an average audience of fourteen million. Tonight Cilla will again invite you to 'Step Inside' — this time in colour. Her guest stars tonight: Frankie Howerd, Sacha Distel with Irving Davies and his dancers and The Breakaways. Orchestra directed by Ronnie Hazlehurst. Frankie Howerd's script by Eric Sykes. Repeated (in monochrome) on BBC1 11 September 1968

=== Series 2 (1968–69) ===
Produced by Michael Hurll. Broadcast Wednesdays on BBC1 at 8:00 pm (unless otherwise noted). Theme Song: "Step Inside Love"

No. overall	No. in series	Title	Directed by	Written by	Original release date
11	1	Episode 1	Michael Hurll	Ronnie Taylor	24 December 1968
Starring Cilla Black. Guest stars: Shari Lewis and Michael Crawford. Special guest: Scott Walker. Featuring The Irving Davies Dancers and The Breakaways. Musical director: Ronnie Hazelhurst.
12	2	Episode 2	Michael Hurll	Ronnie Taylor	31 December 1968
Cilla Black and Frankie Howerd spend New Year's Eve with their friends. Guest star: Matt Monro. Special guests: Billy Cotton. Featuring The Irving Davies Dancers and The Breakaways. Musical director: Ronnie Hazelhurst.
13	3	Episode 3	Michael Hurll	Ronnie Taylor	8 January 1969
Starring Cilla Black. Guest star: Mike Newman. Featuring The Irving Davies Dancers and The Breakaways. Musical director: Ronnie Hazlehurst.
14	4	Episode 4	Michael Hurll	Ronnie Taylor	15 January 1969
Starring Cilla Black. Guest stars: Spike Milligan and Lance Percival. Featuring The Irving Davies Dancers and The Breakaways. Musical director: Ronnie Hazlehurst.
15	5	Episode 5	Michael Hurll	Ronnie Taylor	22 January 1969
Starring Cilla Black. Guest stars: Peter Cook and Françoise Hardy. Featuring The Irving Davies Dancers and The Breakaways. Musical director: Ronnie Hazlehurst.
16	6	Episode 6	Michael Hurll	Ronnie Taylor	29 January 1969
Starring Cilla Black. Guest star: Sheila Hancock. Featuring The Irving Davies Dancers and The Breakaways. Musical director: Ronnie Hazlehurst.
17	7	Episode 7	Michael Hurll	Ronnie Taylor	5 February 1969
Starring Cilla Black. Guest stars: Ian Carmichael, Una Stubbs and from France Sacha Distel. Featuring The Irving Davies Dancers and The Breakaways. Musical director: Ronnie Hazlehurst.
18	8	Episode 8	Vernon Lawrence	Ronnie Taylor	12 February 1969
Starring Cilla Black. Guest stars: Dusty Springfield, Georgie Fame, Graham Chapman, Tim Brooke-Taylor, Graeme Garden and Tom Ward. Featuring The Irving Davies Dancers and The Breakaways. Musical director: Ronnie Hazlehurst.
19	9	Episode 9	Vernon Lawrence	Ronnie Taylor	19 February 1969
Starring Cilla Black. Guest stars: Cliff Richard and Dickie Henderson. Featuring The Irving Davies Dancers and The Breakaways. Musical director: Ronnie Hazlehurst.

=== Series 3 (1969) ===
Produced by Michael Hurll. Broadcast Tuesdays on BBC1 at 8:00 pm Theme Song: "Step Inside Love"

No. overall	No. in series	Title	Directed by	Written by	Original release date
20	1	Episode 1	Michael Hurll	Ronnie Taylor	18 November 1969
Starring Cilla Black. Guest stars: Val Doonican and Moira Anderson. Special guests: The Dudley Moore Trio and Arthur Worsley. Featuring The Nita Howard Dancers and The Breakaways. Musical director: Ronnie Hazelhurst.
21	2	Episode 2	Michael Hurll	Ronnie Taylor	25 November 1969
Starring Cilla Black. Guest stars: Des O'Connor and Peter Cook. Special guest: Ronnie Corbett. Featuring The Irving Davies Dancers and The Breakaways. Musical director: Ronnie Hazelhurst.
22	3	Episode 3	Michael Hurll	Ronnie Taylor	2 December 1969
Starring Cilla Black. Guest stars: Roy Castle and Alan Melville. Special guest: Harry Secombe. Featuring The Irving Davies Dancers and The Breakaways. Musical director: Ronnie Hazelhurst.
23	4	Episode 4	Michael Hurll	Ronnie Taylor	9 December 1969
Starring Cilla Black. Guest stars: Dora Bryan and Sacha Distel. Featuring Johnny Hackett, The Irving Davies Dancers and The Breakaways. Musical director: Ronnie Hazlehurst.
24	5	Episode 5	Michael Hurll	Ronnie Taylor	16 December 1969
Tonight Cilla is joined by another of Britain's best girl singers - Sandie Shaw singing a track from her new LP 'Reviewing the Situation' as well as a duet with Cilla. Another duet partner will be Henry Mancini who will be sharing one of his best-known songs, Moon River, with Cilla. The comedy comes from Tim Brooke-Taylor, Graeme Garden, and Graham Chapman. Featuring The Nita Howard Dancers and The Breakaways. Musical Director: Ronnie Hazlehurst.
25	6	Episode 6	Michael Hurll	Ronnie Taylor	24 December 1969
Starring Cilla Black. Guest star: Dusty Springfield. Special Guest: Cliff Richard. Featuring 'Review of Pop '69' with Kenny Everett. With The Nita Howard Dancers and The Breakaways. Musical director: Ronnie Hazlehurst.

=== Series 4 (1971) ===
Produced by Michael Hurll. Broadcast Saturdays on BBC1. Theme Song: "Step Inside Love"

No. overall	No. in series	Title	Directed by	Written by	Original release date
26	1	Episode 1	Michael Hurll	Ronnie Taylor with Talbot Rothwell	23 January 1971
The first show in her new series starring Cilla Black with Frankie Howerd. Guest stars: Thora Hird and Buddy Greco. Featuring The Irving Davies Dancers and The Breakaways. Musical director: Ronnie Hazelhurst.
27	2	Episode 2	Michael Hurll	Ronnie Taylor	30 January 1971
Starring Cilla Black. Guest stars: Bruce Forsyth and Alan Melville. Special guest from America: Jerry Lewis. Featuring The Irving Davies Dancers and The Breakaways. Musical director: Ronnie Hazelhurst.
28	3	Episode 3	Michael Hurll	Ronnie Taylor	6 February 1971
Starring Cilla Black. Guest stars: Dudley Moore and Derek Nimmo. Special guest star: Sacha Distel. Featuring The Irving Davies Dancers and The Breakaways. Musical director: Ronnie Hazelhurst.
29	4	Episode 4	Michael Hurll	Ronnie Taylor	13 February 1971
Starring Cilla Black. Guest stars: Stanley Holloway and Noel Harrison. Special guest star: Ringo Starr. Featuring The Irving Davies Dancers and The Breakaways. Musical director: Ronnie Hazlehurst.
30	5	Episode 5	Michael Hurll	Ronnie Taylor	20 February 1971
Starring Cilla Black. Guest stars: Mike & Bernie Winters and Sid James. With Roger Cook and Roger Greenaway with children from the Corona School. Featuring The Irving Davies Dancers and The Breakaways. Musical director: Ronnie Hazlehurst.
31	6	Episode 6	Michael Hurll	Ronnie Taylor	27 February 1971
Starring Cilla Black. Guest stars: Jimmy Tarbuck with Peter Cook, Moira Anderson and Frank and Peggy Spencer's Rock 'n' Roll Formation Team. Featuring The Irving Davies Dancers and The Breakaways. Musical director: Ronnie Hazlehurst.
32	7	Episode 7	Michael Hurll	Ronnie Taylor	6 March 1971
Starring Cilla Black. Guest stars: Bob Hope with Ronnie Corbett and Vince Hill. Featuring The Irving Davies Dancers and The Breakaways. Musical director: Ronnie Hazlehurst.

=== Series 5 (1971) ===
Produced by Michael Hurll. Broadcast Saturdays on BBC1. Theme Song: "Something Tells Me (Something's Gonna Happen Tonight)"

No. overall	No. in series	Title	Directed by	Written by	Original release date
33	1	Episode 1	Brian Whitehouse	Ronnie Taylor	6 November 1971
The first live show in a new series starring Cilla Black. Guest star: Jimmy Tarbuck. Special guest: Cliff Richard with Bill Shankly and the Liverpool Football Team. Featuring The Irving Davies Dancers and The Breakaways. Musical director: Ronnie Hazelhurst.
34	2	Episode 2	Ray Lakeland	Ronnie Taylor	13 November 1971
Starring Cilla Black. Guest stars: The Supremes, Sid James and guest appearances of Jack Warner and Eddie Waring. Featuring The Irving Davies Dancers and The Breakaways. Musical director: Ronnie Hazelhurst.
35	3	Episode 3	Michael Hurll	Ronnie Taylor	20 November 1971
A show recorded in the Concert Hall of SFB Berlin. Special guest star Sacha Distel with Michael Bentine. Cilla spricht Deutsch... Fraulein Schwarz von Liverpool had to forsake her familiar haunts for this glamorous and uproarious night in front of an all-German audience in one of West Berlin's biggest concert halls. Featuring Irving Davies and his Dancers and Paul Kuhn and his Orchestra. Musical director: Ronnie Hazelhurst.
36	4	Episode 4	Michael Hurll	Ronnie Taylor	27 November 1971
Starring Cilla Black. A show specially recorded in Stockholm on Midsummer's Day and on film locations in Norway, Sweden and Finland. Guest stars: Ringo Starr, Sven-Bertil Taube, Basil Brush, Marvin, Welch & Farrar and Hannu Mikkola. Choreography Sue Green and Joel Schnee with vocal backing from The Breakaways. Musical director: Ronnie Hazlehurst. A joint production with SVT, NRK and YLE.
37	5	Episode 5	Michael Hurll	Ronnie Taylor	4 December 1971
A live show starring Cilla Black. Special guest star Des O'Connor who takes on London's Saturday-night traffic in a frantic five-mile dash from the London Palladium to the TV Theatre at Shepherd's Bush and back in time for the second half. With The New Seekers, Johnny Hackett and a special film appearance by Frankie Howerd. Featuring The Irving Davies Dancers and The Breakaways. Musical director: Ronnie Hazlehurst.
38	6	Episode 6	Michael Hurll	Ronnie Taylor	11 December 1971
A live show starring Cilla Black. Guest stars Clive Dunn, Roger Cook & Roger Greenaway and a special film appearance by Frankie Howerd plus a live outside broadcast from somewhere in England. Featuring The Irving Davies Dancers and The Breakaways. Musical director: Ronnie Hazlehurst.
39	7	Episode 7	Michael Hurll	Ronnie Taylor	18 December 1971
A live show starring Cilla Black. Special guest star Frankie Howerd. Special guests: The Bachelors, Ken Rosewall and some surprise guests. Featuring The Irving Davies Dancers and The Breakaways. Musical director: Ronnie Hazlehurst.

=== Series 6 (1972–73) ===
Produced by Michael Hurll. Broadcast Saturdays on BBC1. Theme Song: "Something Tells Me (Something's Gonna Happen Tonight)"

No. overall	No. in series	Title	Directed by	Written by	Original release date
40	1	Episode 1	Michael Hurll	Ronnie Taylor	30 December 1972
A live show starring Cilla Black. Special guest stars: Alfred Marks and Donovan. Featuring The Breakaways. Musical director: Ronnie Hazelhurst.
41	2	Episode 2	Michael Hurll	Ronnie Taylor	6 January 1973
A live show starring Cilla Black. Guest stars: Leslie Crowther, Matt Monro and a special guest from America Ethel Merman. Featuring The Breakaways. Musical director: Ronnie Hazelhurst.
42	3	Episode 3	Michael Hurll	Ronnie Taylor	13 January 1973
A live show starring Cilla Black. Guest star Stephen Lewis with A Song for Europe 1973 starring Cliff Richard with The New Shadows who tonight sings Song No 1. Featuring The Breakaways. Musical director: Ronnie Hazelhurst.
43	4	Episode 4	Michael Hurll	Ronnie Taylor	20 January 1973
A live show starring Cilla Black. Guest stars John Alderton and Pan's People with A Song for Europe 1973 starring Cliff Richard with The New Shadows who tonight sings Song No 2. Featuring The Breakaways with choreography by Irving Davies. Musical director: Ronnie Hazelhurst.
44	5	Episode 5	Michael Hurll	Ronnie Taylor	27 January 1973
A live show starring Cilla Black. Guest stars Kenny Lynch and T. Rex with A Song for Europe 1973 starring Cliff Richard with The New Shadows who tonight sings Song No 3. Featuring The Breakaways with choreography by Irving Davies. Musical director: Ronnie Hazlehurst.
45	6	Episode 6	Michael Hurll	Ronnie Taylor	3 February 1973
A live show starring Cilla Black and her star guests with A Song for Europe 1973 starring Cliff Richard with The New Shadows who tonight sings Song No 4. Featuring Cilla in her first situation comedy, "The World of Cilla" with Avis Bunnage and Sam Kelly with John McKelvey and John Clive.
46	7	Episode 7	Michael Hurll	Ronnie Taylor	10 February 1973
A live show starring Cilla Black and her star guest Frankie Howerd with A Song for Europe 1973 starring Cliff Richard with The New Shadows who tonight sings Song No 5. Featuring The Breakaways with choreography by Irving Davies. Musical director: Ronnie Hazlehurst.
47	8	Episode 8	Michael Hurll	Ronnie Taylor	17 February 1973
A live show starring Cilla Black and her guest star Hannah Gordon with A Song for Europe 1973 starring Cliff Richard with The New Shadows who tonight sings Song No 6.
48	9	"A Song For Europe 1973"	Michael Hurll	Ronnie Taylor	24 February 1973
In a special edition, Cilla Black introduces A Song for Europe 1973 starring Cliff Richard with The New Shadows who tonight sings all six Songs for Europe. Musical Director: David Mackay. Viewers are invited to select the song which will represent the UK in this year's Eurovision Song Contest 1973 in Luxembourg.
49	10	Episode 10	Michael Hurll	Ronnie Taylor	3 March 1973
A live show starring Cilla Black The last show of her present series features Cliff Richard with The New Shadows and the result of the voting and the winning song from A Song for Europe 1973. Featuring The Breakaways with choreography by Irving Davies. Musical Director: Ronnie Hazlehurst.

=== Series 7 (1974) ===
Produced by Colin Charman (shows 1-9) and Michael Hurll (shows 10-11). Broadcast Saturdays on BBC1 (except where noted). Theme Song: "Baby, We Can't Go Wrong"

No. overall	No. in series	Title	Directed by	Original release date
50	1	Episode 1	Brian Whitehouse	5 January 1974
The first of a new series starring Cilla Black with special guests Twiggy, Bernard Cribbins and one or two surprise items. Featuring The Breakaways. Musical director: Ronnie Hazelhurst.
51	2	Episode 2	Brian Whitehouse	12 January 1974
Starring Cilla Black with special guests Peter Gilmore, Michael Bates and one or two surprise items. Featuring The Breakaways. Musical director: Ronnie Hazelhurst.
52	3	Episode 3	Brian Whitehouse	19 January 1974
Starring Cilla Black with special guests Bill Owen, Kenneth McKellar and one or two surprise items. Featuring The Breakaways. Musical director: Ronnie Hazelhurst.
53	4	Episode 4	Brian Whitehouse	26 January 1974
Starring Cilla Black with special guests Joe Brown, Milo O'Shea and Design with one or two surprise items. Featuring The Breakaways. Musical director: Ronnie Hazelhurst.
54	5	Episode 5	Brian Whitehouse	2 February 1974
Starring Cilla Black with special guests Gerald Harper, Tony Blackburn and Sweet with one or two surprise items. Featuring The Breakaways. Musical director: Ronnie Hazelhurst.
55	6	Episode 6	Brian Whitehouse	9 February 1974
Starring Cilla Black with special guests Vince Hill, Mike and Bernie Winters and The Band of The Henry Compton School, Fulham, with one or two surprise items. Featuring The Breakaways. Musical director: Ronnie Hazelhurst.
56	7	Episode 7	Brian Whitehouse	16 February 1974
Starring Cilla Black with special guests Dick Emery, Mary Hopkin, Frank Bough and The Brother Lees, with one or two surprise items. Featuring The Breakaways. Musical director: Ronnie Hazelhurst.
57	8	Episode 8	Brian Whitehouse	23 February 1974
Starring Cilla Black with special guests Gerald Harper, Tony Blackburn and Bryan Ferry, with one or two surprise items. Featuring The Breakaways. Musical director: Ronnie Hazelhurst.
58	9	Episode 9	Brian Whitehouse	2 March 1974
Starring Cilla Black with special guests Wilfred Pickles, George Layton and the return of The Shadows, with one or two surprise items. Featuring The Breakaways. Musical director: Ronnie Hazelhurst.
59	–	"Bank Holiday Special"	Michael Hurll	26 August 1974
A special Bank Holiday edition with Ronnie Hazlehurst and his Orchestra. Script by Ronnie Taylor.
60	–	"Boxing Day Special"	Michael Hurll	26 December 1974
A Boxing Day edition starring Cilla Black with her special guest David Essex. Also starring Gerald Harper, The Wombles and The Irving Davies Dancers and vocal backing from The Breakaways with Ronnie Hazlehurst & his Orchestra. Written by Ronnie Taylor.

=== Series 8 (1976) ===
Produced by Michael Hurll & James Moir. Broadcast Saturdays on BBC1. Theme Song: "It's Now!"

No. overall	No. in series	Title	Directed by	Written by	Original release date
61	1	Episode 1	Michael Hurll	Ronnie Taylor	14 February 1976
Starring Cilla Black with special guests Jim Dale, Peters and Lee with members of the public whom Cilla meets at work and who also appear in a live broadcast from somewhere in England. Choreography by Irving Davies. Musical director and special arrangements: Ronnie Hazelhurst.
62	2	Episode 2	Michael Hurll	Ronnie Taylor	21 February 1976
Starring Cilla Black with special guests Dana, Roy Hudd and Diana Dors, with members of the public whom Cilla meets at work and who also appear in a live broadcast from somewhere in England. Choreography by Irving Davies. Musical director and special arrangements: Ronnie Hazelhurst.
63	3	Episode 3	Michael Hurll	Ronnie Taylor	28 February 1976
Starring Cilla Black with special guests Bill Simpson, Andy Williams and The Brother Lees, with members of the public whom Cilla meets at work and who also appear in a live broadcast from somewhere in England. Choreography by Irving Davies. Musical director and special arrangements: Ronnie Hazelhurst.
64	4	Episode 4	Michael Hurll	Ronnie Taylor	6 March 1976
Starring Cilla Black with special guests Keith Barron and Jimmy Tarbuck, with members of the public whom Cilla meets at work and who also appear in a live broadcast from somewhere in England. Choreography by Irving Davies. Musical director and special arrangements: Ronnie Hazelhurst.
65	5	Episode 5	Michael Hurll	Ronnie Taylor	13 March 1976
Starring Cilla Black with special guests Charles Aznavour and Ronnie Corbett, with members of the public whom Cilla meets at work and who also appear in a live broadcast from somewhere in England. Choreography by Irving Davies. Musical director and special arrangements: Ronnie Hazelhurst.
66	6	Episode 6	Michael Hurll	Ronnie Taylor	20 March 1976
Starring Cilla Black with special guests Mike and Bernie Winters, with members of the public whom Cilla meets at work and who also appear in a live broadcast from somewhere in England. Choreography by Irving Davies. Musical director and special arrangements: Ronnie Hazelhurstt.
67	7	Episode 7	Michael Hurll	Ronnie Taylor	27 March 1976
Starring Cilla Black with special guests Brotherhood of Man who head to The Hague to represent Britain in next week's Eurovision Song Contest, Joan Sims and Tim Brooke-Taylor, with members of the public whom Cilla meets at work and who also appear in a live broadcast from somewhere in England. Choreography by Irving Davies. Musical director and special arrangements: Ronnie Hazelhurst.
68	8	Episode 8	Michael Hurll	Ronnie Taylor	10 April 1976
Starring Cilla Black with special guests Sacha Distel, Mike Reid and The Jarvis Brothers, with members of the public whom Cilla meets at work. Choreography by Irving Davies. Musical director and special arrangements: Ronnie Hazelhurst.
69	9	Episode 9	Michael Hurll	Ronnie Taylor	17 April 1976
Starring Cilla Black with special guests Alfred Marks, John Inman and Johnny Mathis, with members of the public whom Cilla meets at work. Choreography by Irving Davies. Musical director and special arrangements: Ronnie Hazelhurst.
