= Through the Years (Cilla Black album) =

Studio album by Cilla Black
- Released: 20 September 1993
- Recorded: 1993
- Genre: Pop
- Label: Columbia
- Producer: Charlie Skarbek

Cilla Black chronology
Cilla's World (1990)	Through the Years (1993)	Beginnings (2003)

Singles from Through the Years
- 1. "Through the Years" Released: September 1993; 2. "Heart & Soul" Released: October 1993; 3. "You'll Never Walk Alone" Released: December 1993

Professional ratings
Review scores
Source	Rating
Music Week	3/5 stars

Through the Years is Cilla Black's fourteenth solo studio album, released in 1993. It features cover versions, re-recordings of some of her best known songs, duets with other singers, and new songs.

The album peaked at no.41 in the UK Albums Chart and was Black's first studio album to appear in the charts since Sweet Inspiration in 1970, which had eventually climbed to no.42.

== Singles ==
Three singles were released from the album: the title track, "Through the Years", which reached #54 in the UK Singles Chart; "Heart and Soul", a duet with Dusty Springfield, which reached #75; "You'll Never Walk Alone", a duet with Barry Manilow; Streets Of London; and Will You Love Me Tomorrow.

== Track listing ==
1. "Through the Years" (Charlie Skarbek, Rick Blaskey)
2. "That's What Friends Are For" (Duet with Cliff Richard) (Burt Bacharach, Carole Bayer Sager)
3. "Here, There and Everywhere" (John Lennon, Paul McCartney)
4. "Heart and Soul" (Duet with Dusty Springfield) (Charlie Skarbek, Rick Blaskey)
5. "Anyone Who Had a Heart" (Burt Bacharach, Hal David)
6. "A Dream Come True" (Peter van Asten, Richard de Bois)
7. "You'll Never Walk Alone" (Duet with Barry Manilow) (Richard Rodgers, Oscar Hammerstein II)
8. "Streets of London" (Ralph McTell)
9. "You're My World (Il Mio Mondo)" (Umberto Bindi, Gino Paoli, Carl Sigman)
10. "From a Distance" (Julie Gold)
11. "Will You Love Me Tomorrow?" (Gerry Goffin, Carole King)
12. "Through the Years" (Reprise) (Charlie Skarbek, Rick Blaskey)

== Credits ==
Personnel

- Lead vocals by Cilla Black
- Produced by Charlie Skarbek
- Executive producer: Rick Blaskey
- Engineered by Pat Stapley, Mark Chamberlain and Charlie Skarbek
- All keyboards and programming by Charlie Skarbek
- Orchestral arrangements by Richard Niles
- Backing vocal arrangements by Tessa Niles
- Cilla Black's musical director: Trevor Brown
- Album cover photograph by John Swannell
