= It Makes Me Feel Good =

Studio album by Cilla Black
- Released: March 1976
- Recorded: 1975
- Genres: Soft rock, country rock
- Label: EMI
- Producer: David Mackay

Cilla Black chronology
In My Life (1974)	It Makes Me Feel Good (1976)	Modern Priscilla (1978)

Singles from It Makes Me Feel Good
- 1. "I'll Take a Tango" Released: July 1975

It Makes Me Feel Good is the title of Cilla Black's ninth solo studio album released in 1976 by EMI Records. The album was Black's second to be produced and arranged by David Mackay.

Mackay revealed on an interview on Black's official website that he considered this album as his best work with the singer and by far the project with the most memories attached. This was mainly down to the fact that some of the album's recording sessions were held in the United States away from the distractions of Black's usual television work commitments.

The creative process involved Mackay flying out beforehand to Los Angeles where he scouted for suitable song material and session musicians. Mackay achieved his goals and hired acclaimed musicians, such as guitarist Lee Ritenour (Carly Simon, Barbra Streisand), bassist Herbie Flowers (Elton John, David Bowie, Harry Nilsson) and Alan Tarney (The Shadows). Black with her husband Bobby Willis then joined Mackay to finalise the song selection and lay her vocals. This was her first recording sessions to be held outside the United Kingdom.

Although completed in 1975, the release of the album was purposely delayed until Black returned to BBC television with her 1976 variety show series Cilla. The album however eluded chart success but did receive critical acclaim in the national press. Black's official website also conducted an opinion poll in the 1990s which revealed the album to be one of her fans all-time favourites. The sessions also yielded Mackay's personal favourite Cilla Black recording which was the cover of "I'll Take a Tango".

== Re-release ==
On 7 September 2009, EMI Records released a special edition of the album exclusively to digital download. The re-issue featured all of the album's original recordings plus rare bonus tracks. A digital booklet containing original album artwork, detailed track information and rare photographs was made available from iTunes with purchases of the entire album re-issue.

== Track listing ==
Side one

1. "Something About You"
2. "I'll Take a Tango"
3. "September Love Affair"
4. "Lay the Music Down"
5. "San Diego Serenade"
6. "Heartbeat"

Side B

1. "Running Out of World"
2. "To Know Him is to Love Him"
3. "It Makes Me Feel Good"
4. "Lay it All Down"
5. "One Step from Your Arms"
6. "Lovin' Land"

== Personnel ==
- Lead vocals by Cilla Black
- Produced and arranged by David Mackay
- Album cover photograph by Allan Ballard
