= Tommy Sandhu =

British game show announcer

- Born: 24 November 1976 (age 49); South Woodford, England
- Occupations: Comedian, radio presenter, disc jockey, remixer, record producer, television presenter

Tommy Sandhu (born 24 November 1976) is an English disc jockey remixer, record producer and television presenter.

== Career ==
Sandhu's first presenting job was with Tess Daly on Smash Hits TV for Sky One. He was also the announcer – replacing Graham Skidmore on the final series of the British version of Blind Date, starring Cilla Black.

Sandhu has DJ'd in many London venues, including Chinawhite, Movida, Café de Paris, Paper, Kensington Roof Gardens and the Shadow Lounge. His DJ sets include funky house and rhythm and blues. As a composer, Sandhu has produced the theme music to several TV shows which include Blind Date (ITV), Britain's Next Top Model (LIVING), Celebrity Snappers (Bravo) and I'd Do Anything (BBC One).

Sandhu began his radio career as the London show business reporter for the BBC Asian Network, covering premieres, parties and gossip from the capital, and going on to host the breakfast show on the station. He joined the station's daily schedule in 2010.

Since 2025, Sandhu has presented the National Curry Week Cook-Off alongside The Apprentice finalist, Anisa Khan, and Richard Blackwood.

== TV / Radio ==
After leaving the BBC Asian Network radio show in 2017, Tommy was brought back onto BBC Radio 2 in 2018 He then went on to work with the BBC for staff training events on how to make radio radio more interactive with audiences.

== Entertainment ==
Sandhu tries to engage with the public in an entertaining and humorous manner. He has worked alongside Desi Central events and LuvEntertainment hosting, and has performed at over 150 stand-up comedy and musical tribute events.

Tommy also hosts Events for the Kings trust, he’s a brand ambassador for Kingfisher beer, Maggi Noodles and can be regularly found compering Awards nights in the food industry, fashion, multicultural apprenticeships, book awards and much more.

== Additional Projects ==
Following his passion for food, Tommy has just launched his own spicy 'Chutnaze' mayonnaise and is developing a derelict property site in Canterbury to become multiple houses and apartments

== Discography ==
- Cilla Black – Step Inside Love (White Label 12"/Burn 'Em Records) [2003]
1. Step Inside Love (Original Mix 6:29)
2. Step Inside Love (Vacation Dub 4:53)
3. Step Inside Love (All Burnt Out Mix 4:20)
- Cilla Black – Beginnings: Greatest Hits & New Songs (EMI Records) [2003]
1. Step Inside Love (All Burnt Out Mix 4:20) [Hidden Track on CD]
- Cilla Black – Beginnings: Revised (EMI Records) [2009]
1. Step Inside Love (All Burnt Out Mix 4:20)
- Cilla Black – Cilla All Mixed Up (EMI Records) [2009]
1. Faded Images (Tommy Sandhu's Ram Mix 3:55)
2. Kiss You All Over (Tommy Sandhu's Big Bill Mix 5:00)
- Cilla Black – Step Inside Love: Tommy Sandhu Remixes (K-Tel) [2009].
1. Step Inside Love (2009 The Stunner Mix 3:32)
2. Step Inside Love (2002 Club Mix 6:37)
3. Step Inside Love (2002 Vacation Dub 4:59)
4. Step Inside Love (2002 Club Mix – Radio Edit 3:10)
5. Step Inside Love (2002 All Burnt Out Mix 4:29)
