= Sher-oo! =

Studio album by Cilla Black
- Released: 1 April 1968
- Recorded: 1967/1968 at EMI Studios, London
- Genre: Pop, Merseybeat, soul
- Label: Parlophone/EMI
- Producer: George Martin

Cilla Black chronology
Cilla Sings a Rainbow (1966)	Sher-oo! (1968)	The Best of Cilla Black (1968)

Singles from Sher-oo!
- 1. "Step Inside Love" Released: March 1968

Professional ratings
Review scores
Source	Rating
AllMusic	3/5 stars

Sher-oo! is Cilla Black's third solo studio album, released on 1 April 1968 by Parlophone Records. The album reached No. 7 on the UK Albums Chart. The album's Paul McCartney-penned lead single "Step Inside Love" reached #8 on the UK Singles Chart. The song was the opening theme tune to the first four series of the BBC TV variety show Cilla. The album was re-issued in the 1970s with different cover art and re-titled Step Inside Love, on the EMI Music For Pleasure (MFP) label.

== Re-release ==
On September 7, 2009, EMI Records released a special edition of the album exclusively to digital download. This re-issue features all of the album's original recordings re-mastered by Abbey Road Studios from original 1/4" stereo master tapes. A digital booklet containing original album artwork, detailed track information and rare photographs will be available from iTunes with purchases of the entire album re-issue.

== Track listing ==
Side One

1. "What the World Needs Now is Love" (Burt Bacharach, Hal David)
2. "Suddenly You Love Me" (Daniele Pace, Mario Panzeri, Lorenzo Pilat, Peter Callander)
3. "This is the First Time" (Doug Flett, Guy Fletcher)
4. "Follow the Path of the Stars" (Doug Flett, Guy Fletcher)
5. "Misty Roses" (Tim Hardin)
6. "Take Me in Your Arms and Love Me" (Barrett Strong, Roger Penzabene, Cornelius Grant)

Side Two

1. "Yo Yo" (Joe South)
2. "Something's Gotten Hold of My Heart" (Roger Greenaway, Roger Cook)
3. "Step Inside Love" (John Lennon, Paul McCartney)
4. "A Man and A Woman (Un Homme et Une Femme)" (Francis Lai, Pierre Barouh, Jerry Keller)
5. "I Couldn't Take My Eyes Off You" (Bobby Willis, Clive Westlake)
6. "Follow Me" (Paddy Roberts)

== Credits ==
Personnel

- Lead vocals by Cilla Black
- Produced by George Martin
- Arranged and conducted by Mike Vickers
- Album cover photograph by John Kelly

== Chart positions ==
Chart (1968)	Peak position
UK Albums Chart	7
