= Modern Priscilla =

Studio album by Cilla Black
- Released: June 1978
- Recorded: 1977/1978
- Genre: Disco, Pop
- Label: EMI
- Producer: Mike Hurst

Cilla Black chronology
It Makes Me Feel Good (1976)	Modern Priscilla (1978)	Especially for You (1980)

Singles from Modern Priscilla
- 1. "Silly Boy" Released: May 1978; 2. "The Other Woman" Released: September 1978

Modern Priscilla is the tenth solo studio album by English singer Cilla Black and her last to be completed before the end of her 15-year contract with the EMI group. The release of this album with its two singles completed the long-term partnership with the recording giant.

For her final project EMI drafted in producer Mike Hurst who at the time was producing the successful Rock 'n' Roll-revival group Showaddywaddy. Hurst initially was drafted in to produce a recording session for Black's standalone single release "I Wanted to Call It Off". The disco tinged single from July 1977 was a sign of things to come as for the album project Hurst further exploited this genre. The album notably featured three songs by songwriters Dominic Bugatti and Frank Musker who had written "Woman in Love" for The Three Degrees and "(The World Is Full of) Married Men" for Bonnie Tyler. The latter song was also recorded by Bette Midler.

== Re-release ==
On 7 September 2009, EMI Records released a special edition of the album exclusively to digital download. The re-issue featured all of the album's original recordings plus rare bonus tracks. A digital booklet containing original album artwork, detailed track information and rare photographs was also made available from iTunes with purchases of the entire album re-issue.

== Track listing ==
Side one

1. "Silly Boy" (Dominic Bugatti, Frank Musker)
2. "The Other Woman" (Kenny Lynch, Steve O'Donnell, Colin Horton-Jennings)
3. "Me and the Elephant" (Barry Whiteland)
4. "Keep Your Mind on Love" (Kenny Lynch, Steve O'Donnell, Colin Horton-Jennings)
5. "Putting it Down to the Way I Feel" (Ken Gold)
6. "Sugar Daddy" (Miller)

Side two

1. "Opening Night" (Dominic Bugatti, Frank Musker)
2. "Brooklyn" (Lesty Pedroski)
3. "I Couldn't Make My Mind Up" (Mike Hurst)
4. "Heart Get Ready for Love" (Dominic Bugatti, Frank Musker)
5. "Love Lines" (Kenny Lynch, Steve O'Donnell, Colin Horton-Jennings)
6. "Platform Rocker" (Sandy St. John, Mark Gibbons)

Extra tracks on re-release

1. "This Time I'm in It for Love"
2. "If I Could Put You in My Song"
3. "When You Walk in the Room"
4. "I Wanted to Call It Off"
5. "Songs"
6. "Silly Boy (Paul Hulme Mix)"

== Credits ==
Personnel

- Lead vocals by Cilla Black
- Produced by Mike Hurst
- Arranged by Colin Frechter
- Album cover & design by Cream
