= Michael Hurll =

English television director and producer

- Born: 7 October 1936
- Died: 18 September 2012 (aged 75)
- Occupation: Television producer
- Employer(s): BBC, LWT

Michael Hurll (7 October 1936 – 18 September 2012) was a British television producer who specialized in the comedy and light entertainment genres. He produced many British TV shows including The Two Ronnies, Top of the Pops, and Blind Date. He was for many years a producer for the BBC, and later worked for LWT and as an independent producer. He also had a long association with television hosts Cilla Black and Noel Edmonds. At the BBC, he was the producer of The Eurovision Song Contest twice, taking charge of the 1974 contest in Brighton (won by Abba) and again in 1982 in Harrogate.

He was the originator of the British Comedy Awards, and for many years produced them, through his company Michael Hurll Television.

He died of Parkinson's disease in 2012, aged 75.
