= Cilla's World =

Studio album by Cilla Black
- Released: 12 November 1990
- Recorded: 1990
- Genre: Children's Music
- Labels: Virgin, Australia; Silva Screen, England
- Producer: Rod Edwards

Cilla Black chronology
Surprisingly Cilla (1985)	Cilla's World (1990)	Through the Years (1993)

Cilla's World is the title of Cilla Black's thirteenth solo studio album. It was a concept album themed around sixteen original children's songs about animals, green issues and the environment recorded specifically for the Australian music market (Black's second most successful music market in the world).

Sold on the idea of such an unusual concept, Black agreed to go ahead with the album that featured primarily songs co-written by Play School TV presenter Don Spencer. The recording sessions were held at AIR Studios in London and although produced by Ron Edwards were supervised by Black's former producer George Martin.

The project was independently produced by the music company MCA/Gilbey and released by Virgin in Australia, which produced the album's packaging from recycled paper.

In 1993, the album was given a release in Great Britain by Silva Screen Records.

== Track listing ==
1. "The (Solar Powered, Practical, Combustible, Compatible, Responsibly Recyclable) Machine"
2. "Don't Argue with an Elephant"
3. "A Little More Green"
4. "ABC of the World"
5. "Penguin Strut"
6. "Rain"
7. "Trees"
8. "Eggs"
9. "Panda"
10. "Personality"
11. "Weather Song"
12. "Sunshine Medley"
13. "Please Don't Call Me a Koala Bear"
14. "Let's Hear it for Skin"
15. "The End of the Day"
16. "Goodnight"

== Credits ==
Personnel

- Lead vocals by Cilla Black
- Produced and arranged by Rod Edwards
- Engineered by Lance Phillips, Rupert Coulson & Geoff Foster
- Executive producers: Chris Gilbey and Joanne Peterson
