= Bobby Willis =

British songwriter (1942–1999)

- Born: Robert Willis; 25 January 1942; Liverpool, England
- Died: 23 October 1999 (aged 57); London, England
- Occupations: Songwriter; talent manager
- Spouse: Cilla Black (m. 1969)
- Children: 4

Robert Willis (25 January 1942 – 23 October 1999) was an English songwriter and talent manager who became the manager and eventually husband of singer Cilla Black.

== Career ==
His first known recorded composition, "Shy of Love" was featured on the B-side of "Love of the Loved", the debut release of Cilla Black in September 1963. During the sixties he was to write many songs for his then girlfriend to record and perform.

One of his most popular – "Is It Love?" – was featured in the beat film Ferry Cross the Mersey in 1965. He collaborated with Clive Westlake, Kenny Lynch and The Beatles' producer George Martin on some songs.

After the death of Black's manager, Brian Epstein, Willis took over her management duties and over the next thirty years, developed her popularity with television family audiences, and helped Black to become the highest-paid female presenter on television.

== Personal life ==
Willis had four brothers, named Albert, Ronnie, Bertie, and Kenneth.

Willis married Cilla Black on 25 January 1969, his 27th birthday, at Marylebone Town Hall. To please her Catholic family, the couple were granted a dispensation to have their marriage blessed on 6 March 1969 at St Mary's Church in Liverpool's Woolton suburb. (Willis was from an Anglican background.) They had three sons together: Robert (born 1970), Ben (born 1974), and Jack (born 1980). Their daughter Ellen (born 1975) lived for only two hours.

== Death ==
On 23 October 1999, aged 57, Willis died of lung and liver cancer at the Royal Free Hospital in London. His funeral service was held on 1 November 1999 at Saint Mary the Virgin Church in Denham, Buckinghamshire. He was cremated.

== Discography ==
=== As songwriter ===
==== Singles ====
- "Shy of Love" (A-side "Love of the Loved") UK#35 September 1963
- "Just for You" (A-side "Anyone Who Had a Heart") UK#1 Jan. 1964
- "Suffer Now I Must" (A-side "You're My World") UK#1 May 1964
- "He Won't Ask Me" (A-side "It's for You") UK#7 July 1964
- "Is It Love?" (A-side "You've Lost That Lovin' Feelin'") UK#2 January 1965
- "I Don't Want to Know" (A-side "I've Been Wrong Before") UK#17 April 1965
- "Night Time Is Here" (A-side "Alfie") UK#9 March 1966
- "From Now On" (Bobby Willis/Clive Westlake) (A-side "I Only Live to Love You") UK#26 November 1967
- "I Couldn't Take My Eyes Off You" (Bobby Willis/Clive Westlake) (A-side "Step Inside Love") UK#8 March 1968
- "London Bridge" (Bobby Willis/Clive Westlake) (A-side "Surround Yourself with Sorrow") UK#3 February 1969
- "That's Why I Love You" (Bobby Willis/Kenny Lynch) (A-side "Child of Mine") December 1970

==== Album tracks ====
- "Come to Me" (George Martin/Bobby Willis) Cilla January 1965
- "Our Brand New World" (Bobby Willis/Clive Westlake) Images May 1971
