= Step Inside Love =

Song by Cilla Black

- A-side label of UK single

Single by Cilla Black

from the album Sher-oo!
- B-side: "I Couldn't Take My Eyes Off You"
- Released: 8 March 1968
- Genre: Pop
- Length: 2:22
- Label: Parlophone R5674
- Songwriter: Lennon–McCartney
- Producer: George Martin

Cilla Black singles chronology
| "I Only Live to Love You" (1967) | "Step Inside Love" (1968) | "Where is Tomorrow" (1968) |

Music video
- "Step Inside Love" on YouTube

"Step Inside Love/Los Paranoias"

Song by the Beatles

from the album Anthology 3
- Released: 28 October 1996
- Recorded: 16 September 1968
- Genre: Folk rock
- Length: 2:30
- Label: Apple Records
- Songwriters: Lennon–McCartney, George Harrison, Ringo Starr
- Producer: Chris Thomas

Official audio
- "Step Inside Love/Los Paranoias" on YouTube

"Step Inside Love" is a song written by Paul McCartney (credited as "Lennon–McCartney") for Cilla Black in 1967 as a theme for her television series Cilla, which first aired on 30 January 1968.

== Background ==
In late 1967 Paul McCartney was approached to write the theme by Black and her series producer Michael Hurll. He recorded the original demo version at his London home, accompanying himself on guitar, which consisted of just one verse and the chorus.

Black's recording of this song was used as the theme during the early weeks of the show, until it was decided that the song needed an additional verse, so McCartney came to the BBC Theatre and wrote it there. According to Hurll, the opening line of the second verse ("You look tired, love") came from McCartney's observation of Black looking tired from the long rehearsals for the television show. McCartney then added a third verse and that version was recorded as a studio demo at Chappell Studios in London on 21 November 1967, with McCartney on guitar accompanying Black on vocals. That demo was the basis for the single, although whereas the McCartney demos were recorded in the key of D, the final arrangement of the single version was transposed up a fourth to G, to take advantage of Black's higher register.

The single version of the song (with Black singing live over the studio backing track) was premiered on 5 March 1968 edition of her show; the single was released on 8 March 1968, and reached number eight on the British charts in April 1968. The record also reached Number 15 in Ireland in the same month, Number 12 in New Zealand, and Number 97 in Canada. The recording was also featured on Black's third solo studio album Sher-oo! Cashbox called it an "unusual bossa nova composition which crescendoes into a pulsing chorus and alternates soft and strong" Remixed club versions of Cilla's original 1960s vocal were released in 2009 on her album Cilla All Mixed Up.

Judd Proctor played the guitar on the single.

In 2002, disc-jockey Tommy Sandhu managed to coax Black into the recording studio again to re-record "Step Inside Love". Sandhu then remixed the song and 3,000 white labels of it were sent to British clubs under the name "TS vs CB". The 12" charted at number three on Music Week's club chart. A maxi single of all of these remixes was released to download worldwide on 30 November 2009.

In 2010, during a BBC interview, Black revealed that the song had been banned in South Africa due to fears that the lyrics contained hidden sexual elements.

The grave marker beneath the headstone on Black's burial plot in Allerton Cemetery is inscribed with six of the seven lines from the third verse of "Step Inside Love". Lyrics from Black's hits "Alfie" and "You're My World" also appear on the marker. The black marble headstone and marker were installed 18 April 2016, some eight months after Black's 1 August 2015 death. Following the December 2015 theft of its original bronze nameplate, Black's grave remained unmarked until drier weather permitted the installation of the marble headstone and marker.

== McCartney recording ==
McCartney recorded the song on 16 September 1968 during The Beatles (also known as "the White Album") sessions, but it did not appear on the album. After an impromptu performance of "Step Inside Love", McCartney led the group into "Los Paranoias", which (despite George Harrison not being present) was credited to all four members of the band. The two songs were released as a single track on Anthology 3 in 1996, and also appear on the deluxe version of 2018's 50th anniversary edition of The Beatles.

=== The Beatles personnel ===
- Paul McCartney – vocals, acoustic guitar
- John Lennon – bongos
- Ringo Starr – claves

Personnel per The Beatles Bible

== Other versions ==
Madeline Bell later of pop band Blue Mink recorded a version on her January 1969 Doin' Things album, released on Philips Records.

The Paper Dolls recorded a version on their 1968 album Paper Dolls House, released on Pye and again on Paper Dolls House: The Pye Anthology, released on CD on Sanctuary in 2001.

On 15 September 1997 EMI Records released The Abbey Road Decade: 1963–73, a three-disc compilation album of Black's recordings. It featured the single version of "Step Inside Love", an Italian-language version ("M'Innamoro"), the original demo (featuring McCartney), and an alternate take.

Recordings of "Step Inside Love" as the Beatles may have performed it are available on the 1989 album by Bas Muys entitled Secret Songs: Lennon & McCartney and on the 1998 release It's Four You by the Australian tribute band The Beatnix.

Canadian singer Pagliaro released a French-Canadian language version called "L'amour est là" in 1970.

Steve Dawson of rock band Saxon recorded a version on his 2003 Pandemonium Circus album, released on Angel Air Records.

The Wedding Present recorded a version for the Huw Stephens' Radio Show, in 2006, it was finally released on a Huw Stephens' EP in November 2018 along with 3 cover version songs.

Saskia Bruin recorded a Latin jazz version of this song, released on her 2009 album entitled Step Inside Love.

Elvis Costello released a version in 1994 as a B-side for his song "You Tripped at Every Step". The Costello version also appears on the expanded version of his album Kojak Variety.
