= Kim McLean =

American singer-songwriter

- Also known as: Kim Patton; Kim Patton-Johnston
- Born: April 1, 1961 (age 63)
- Origin: Greensboro, North Carolina, United States
- Genres: Americana, Gospel, Country, Bluegrass
- Occupation: Singer-songwriter
- Instrument: Vocals
- Years active: 197x-present
- Labels: Hippie Chick Twang

Kim McLean (born April 1, 1961; formerly known as Kim Patton or Kim Patton-Johnston) is a singer-songwriter originally from Greensboro, North Carolina. McLean moved to Nashville to pursue a career in songwriting. A month after arriving in Music City, she signed her first staff songwriting deal with an upstart publishing company, Little Big Town, run by publishing mogul, Woody Bomar.

== Commercial success ==
One year later, she received her first songwriting credit for Terri Gibbs, who had recently received the CMA's Horizon Award. From that sprang a continuing career of over 200 songwriting credits including genres of country, bluegrass, Americana, AAA, pop, and blues. In 1999, McLean received a Dove Award for Country Gospel song of the year for "Count Your Blessing" which was recorded by The Martins. Other artists who've recorded Kim McLean songs include Tim McGraw, The Happy Goodmans, Trisha Yearwood, Jennifer Hanson, Lee Ann Womack, Billy Gilman, Sierra, and more. Since her first publishing deal with Little Big Town, she has also written for EMI, Centergy, King Lizard, New Haven, Worley World, Skyline, and Sony-Tree. Her own publishing company, Kim McLean Music houses most of her Gospel copyrights.

Her songs have been used on several major network TV shows including JAG, Early Edition, As the World Turns, The West Wing, and Hope & Faith, which also included a cameo appearance by McLean. Rick Schroder used "All We Ever Find", a McLean composition recorded by Tim McGraw, for the feature film Black Cloud, about a Native American boxer who made the Olympic boxing team.

In 2001, McLean returned to her maiden name, and launched a solo artist career of her own with the creation of Hippie Chick Twang Records. Her album, Happy Face contains the song "Angels and Eagles" with Dolly Parton starring as background singer. The title cut of the album, Kim McLean composed with Kenny Alphin, Big Kenny of Big and Rich.

== College and record label founding ==
At the same time she began her artist career, she used her songwriting royalties to reclaim a lost dream of a college education, cut short in her teen-age years due to an almost fatal struggle with an eating disorder. Treatment, recovery, and years of hoping led her to Trevecca Nazarene University (TNU) in Nashville, just a stone's throw from Music Row. In 2005, McLean graduated with honors and a degree in music business from TNU, and re-enrolled in the fall for the Master's Program in Bible. At this time, McLean is teaching songwriting at TNU as Adjunct Professor of Songwriting.

Hippie Chick Twang, the company she founded, has grown from a small indie label co-op that touts "positive music for women and the men who love them" to a media company and music publishing house. McLean partnered with one of her co-writers, broadcaster Devon O'Day to form the Hippie Chick Twang enterprises. In 2006, Kim McLean won the Just Plain Folk Awards' Americana Song of the Year with "Forever Everyday". Her album, Happy Face was voted third runner up in the Americana Album of the Year.

Goodbye My Friend: Celebrating the Memory of a Pet is a book/CD combination with text written by Devon O'Day and an accompanying CD written and performed by McLean. It is a gift of condolence and comfort for someone who's lost a pet. The project was published by Thomas Nelson in 2007.

== Production ==
McLean has produced two albums for Sonia Lee, From the Heart and True. Both records were released by McLean's Hippie Chick Twang Records.
