= Something Tells Me (Something's Gonna Happen Tonight) =

Single by Cilla Black
- B-side: "La La La Lu"
- Released: 5 November 1971
- Genre: Pop
- Length: 2:25
- Label: Parlophone
- Songwriter(s): Roger Greenaway, Roger Cook
- Producer(s): George Martin

Cilla Black singles chronology
"Child of Mine" (1970)	"Something Tells Me (Something's Gonna Happen Tonight)" (1971)	"The World I Wish for You" (1972)

"Something Tells Me (Something's Gonna Happen Tonight)" is a song by English recording artist Cilla Black, released in 1971.

== Background ==
Written by songwriters Roger Greenaway and Roger Cook, "Something Tells Me (Something's Gonna Happen Tonight)" was released on 5 November 1971 and became a major success for Black, reaching number 3 in both the UK and Ireland during the Christmas period of 1971. The single was produced by George Martin, who had previously produced her UK number 1 singles "Anyone Who Had a Heart" and "You're My World". The song was originally written in the key of G major and Black's vocal range spans from G_{3} to C_{5}. The song was Black's biggest hit in the 1970s, as well as her last appearance in the top ten on the UK Singles Chart. The song was also the theme to the fifth series of Black's BBC variety show Cilla. Black also performed the song on Top of the Pops.

The song's B-side, "La La La Lu", was written by Mike Vickers for the film version of Please Sir!, and was also produced by Martin.

In 2006 the Italian chocolatiers Ferrero Rocher used the song in a national television campaign throughout the UK.

== Charts ==
Chart (1971)	Peak position
Australian Singles Chart	61
Irish Singles Chart	3
New Zealand Singles Chart	13
UK Singles Chart	3

== Cover versions ==
- Bobbi Martin recorded a version of the song for Buddah Records in 1972, which reached #16 on the US Billboard magazine Adult Contemporary (easy listening) chart.
- The Drifters released a version of the song as the B-side to their 1972 single "Everynight". The track was subsequently included on their 1973 album "The Drifters Now".
- British recording artist Emma Bunton covered the song for her third studio album Life in Mono.
