= Cilla Black =

English singer and media personality (1943–2015)

Cilla Black OBE
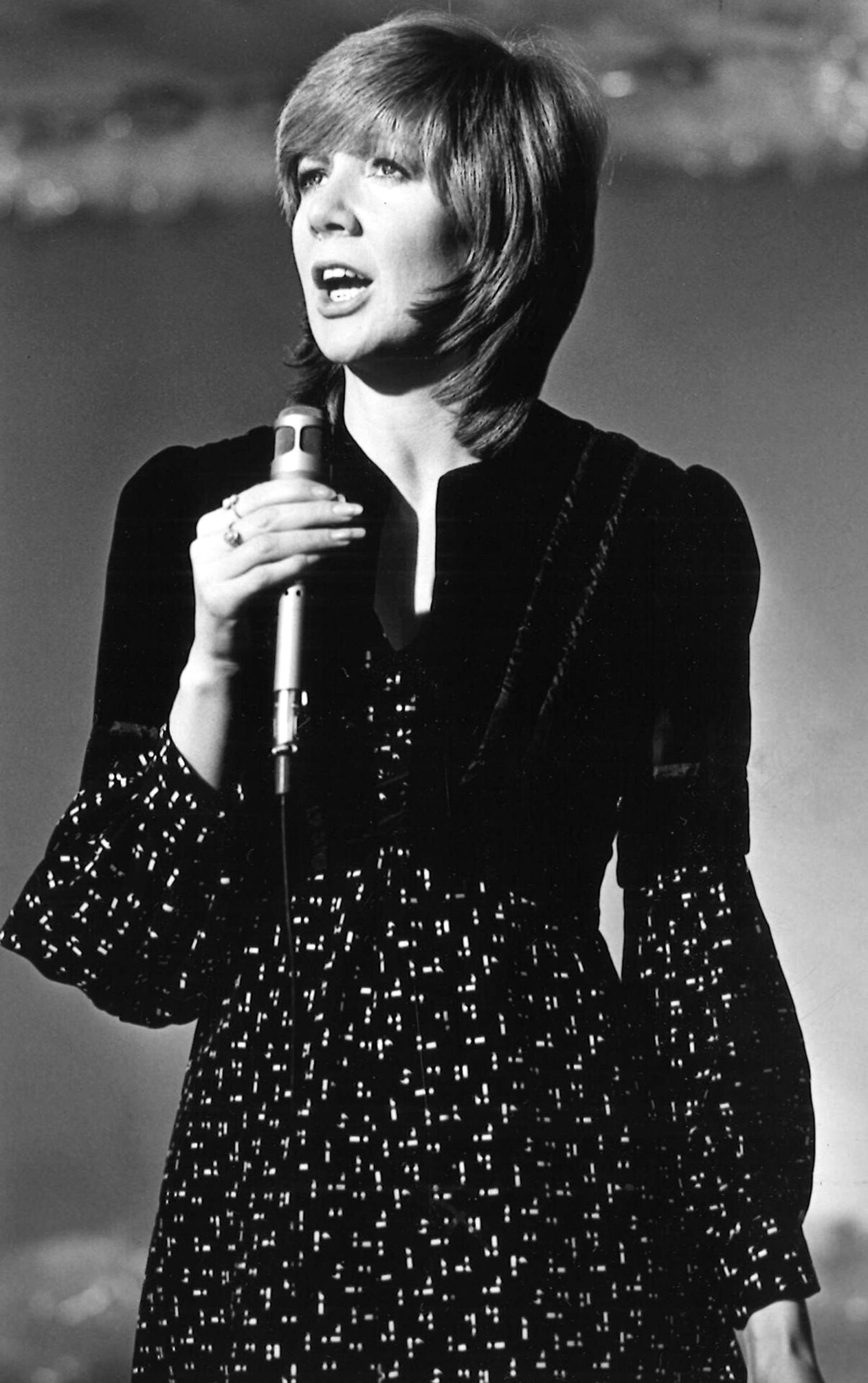
- Black in 1971
- Born: Priscilla Maria Veronica White; 27 May 1943; Vauxhall, Liverpool, England
- Died: 1 August 2015 (aged 72); Estepona, Andalusia, Spain
- Resting place: Allerton Cemetery, Liverpool
- Occupations: Singer; television presenter; actress
- Years active: 1963–2015
- Television: Cilla; Surprise Surprise; Blind Date; The Moment of Truth
- Spouse: Bobby Willis (m. 1969; died 1999)
- Children: 4
- Musical career
- Genres: Pop; rock; beat; soul; adult contemporary
- Instrument: Vocals
- Works: Discography
- Labels: Parlophone; EMI; Towerbell; Columbia; Virgin
- Website: cillablack.com

Priscilla Maria Veronica Willis (née White; 27 May 1943 – 1 August 2015), known professionally as Cilla Black, was an English singer, actress and television presenter.

Championed by her friends the Beatles, Black began her career as a singer in 1963. Her singles "Anyone Who Had a Heart" and "You're My World" both reached number one in the UK in 1964. She had eleven top-ten hits on the UK Singles Chart between then and 1971 and an additional eight hits that made the top 40. In May 2010, new research published by BBC Radio 2 showed that her version of "Anyone Who Had a Heart" was the UK's biggest-selling single by a female artist in the 1960s. "You're My World" reached No. 14 in Canada and was also a modest hit in the U.S., peaking at No. 26 on the Billboard Hot 100.

Along with a successful recording career in the 1960s and early 1970s, Black hosted her own BBC variety show, Cilla (1968–1976). After a brief time as a comedy actress, she became a prominent television presenter in the 1980s and 1990s, hosting hit entertainment shows such as Blind Date (1985–2003), Surprise Surprise (1984–2001) and The Moment of Truth (1998–2001). In 2013, Black celebrated 50 years in show business. ITV honoured this milestone with a one-off entertainment special which aired on 16 October 2013, The One and Only Cilla Black, featuring Black herself and hosted by Paul O'Grady. In 2006, the British public ranked Black number 36 in ITV's poll of TV's 50 Greatest Stars.

Black died on 1 August 2015 aged 72, after a fall in her holiday villa in Estepona, in Spain. The day after her funeral, the compilation album The Very Best of Cilla Black (2013) went to number one on the UK Albums Chart and the New Zealand Albums Chart; it was her first number one album. In 2017, a statue of Black commissioned by her sons was unveiled outside the Cavern Club's original entrance.

== Early life ==
Black was born Priscilla Maria Veronica White in the Vauxhall district of Liverpool on 27 May 1943, the daughter of Priscilla Blythen (1911–1996) and John Patrick White (1904–1971). She grew up in the Scotland Road area of Vauxhall. Her maternal grandfather, Joseph Henry Blythen (1883–1966), was born in the Welsh town of Wrexham; Blythen is a Welsh name. Black's other great-grandparents were Irish. She was raised in a Roman Catholic household and attended St Anthony's School in Scotland Road. She later attended Anfield Commercial College, where she learned office skills.

Determined to become an entertainer, Black gained a part-time job as a cloakroom attendant at Liverpool's Cavern Club, best known for its connection with the Beatles. Her impromptu performances impressed the Beatles and others. She was encouraged to begin singing by a Liverpool promoter, Sam Leach, who booked her first gig at the Zodiac Club on Duke Street, where she appeared as Swinging Cilla, backed by the Big Three. She later also became a guest singer with the Merseybeat bands Rory Storm and the Hurricanes and Kingsize Taylor and the Dominoes. Meanwhile, she worked as a waitress at the Zodiac coffee lounge, where she met her future husband Bobby Willis. She was featured in an article in the first edition of the local music newspaper Mersey Beat by the paper's publisher, Bill Harry, who mistakenly referred to her as "Cilla Black" rather than her real name. She subsequently decided to keep the name.

== Music career ==
=== Early fame – the Brian Epstein years ===
Black signed her first contract with longtime friend and neighbour Terry McCann, but this contract was not binding as it was made when she was a minor (the age of majority was then 21), and her father subsequently signed her with Brian Epstein.

She was introduced to Epstein by John Lennon, who persuaded him to audition her. Lennon was encouraged by his Aunt Mimi to introduce Black to Epstein. Epstein had a portfolio of local artists, but initially showed little interest in her. Her first audition was a failure, partly because of nerves, and partly because the Beatles (who supported her) played the songs in their usual vocal key rather than re-pitching them for Black's voice.

In her autobiography What's It All About? she wrote:

I'd chosen to do "Summertime", but at the very last moment I wished I hadn't. I adored this song, and had sung it when I came to Birkenhead with the Big Three, but I hadn't rehearsed it with the Beatles and it had just occurred to me that they would play it in the wrong key. It was too late for second thoughts, though. With one last wicked wink at me, John set the group off playing. I'd been right to worry. The music was not in my key and any adjustments that the boys were now trying to make were too late to save me. My voice sounded awful. Destroyed—and wanting to die—I struggled on to the end.

But after seeing her another day, at the Blue Angel jazz club, Epstein contracted with Black as his only female client on 6 September 1963. Epstein introduced Black to George Martin who signed her to Parlophone Records and produced her début single, "Love of the Loved" (written by Lennon and McCartney), which was released only three weeks after she joined Epstein. Despite an appearance on ABC Weekend TV's popular Thank Your Lucky Stars, the single peaked at a modest No. 35 in the UK, a relative failure compared to the débuts of Epstein's most successful artists (the Beatles, Gerry and the Pacemakers and Billy J. Kramer with the Dakotas).

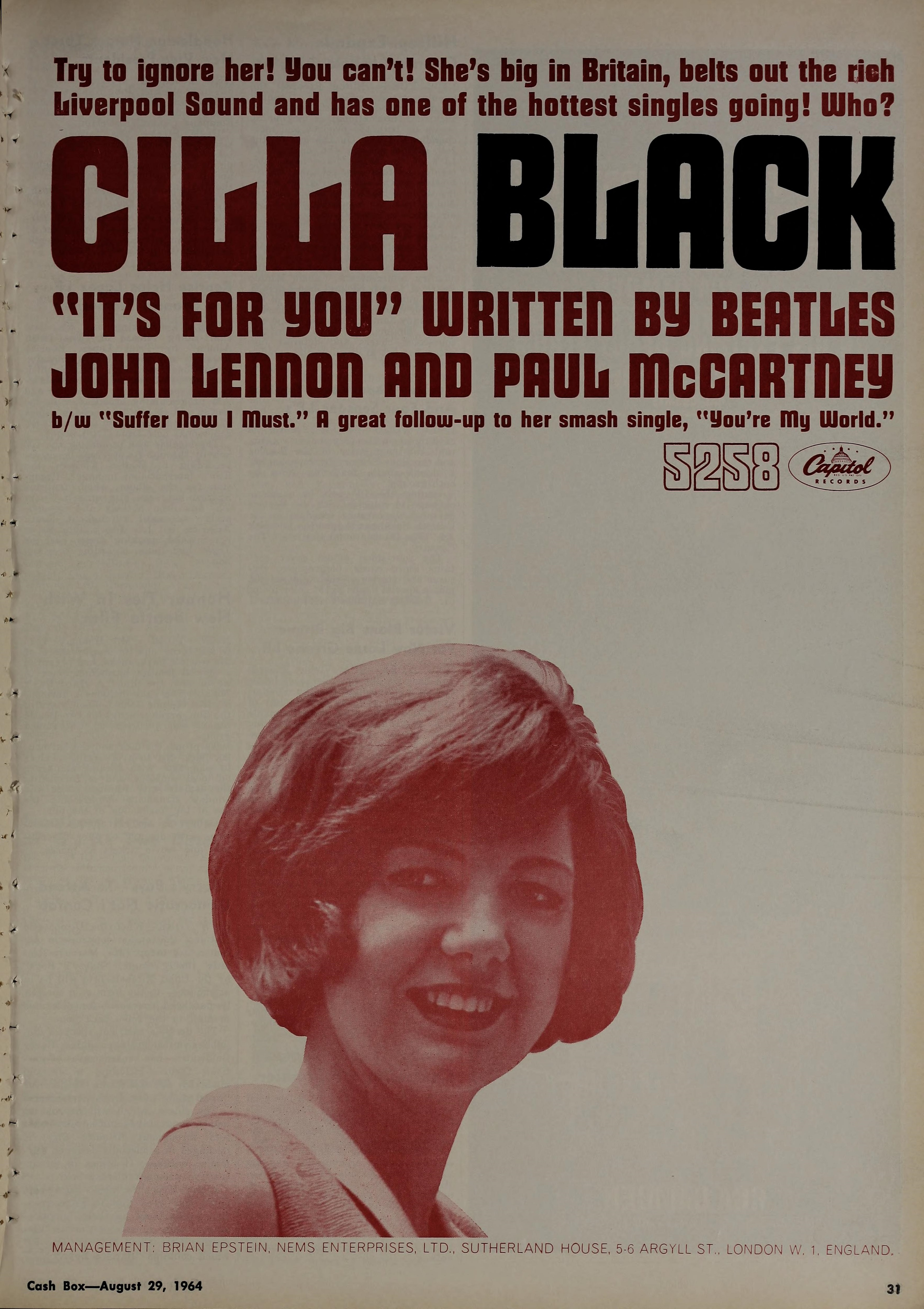
Cashbox advertisement, 29 August 1964

Black's second single, released at the beginning of 1964, was a cover of the Burt Bacharach–Hal David composition "Anyone Who Had a Heart", which had been written for Dionne Warwick. The single beat Warwick's recording into the UK charts and rose to No. 1 in Britain in February 1964 (spending three weeks there), selling 800,000 UK copies in the process. Her second UK No. 1 success, "You're My World", was an English-language rendition of the Italian popular song "Il Mio Mondo" by composer Umberto Bindi. She also enjoyed chart success with the song in America, Australia, New Zealand, Europe, South Africa and Canada. Both songs sold over one million copies worldwide, and were awarded gold discs.

Black's two No. 1 successes were followed by the release of another Lennon–McCartney composition, "It's for You", as her fourth UK single. Paul McCartney played piano at the recording session, and the song proved to be another success for Black, peaking at No. 7 on the UK charts. In Canada it reached No. 39.

Black belonged to a generation of British female singers which included Dusty Springfield, Helen Shapiro, Petula Clark, Sandie Shaw, Marianne Faithfull, and Lulu. Other than Clark, these singers were not songwriters. Black recorded much material during this time, including songs written by Phil Spector, Tim Hardin and Burt Bacharach. All were produced by George Martin at Abbey Road Studios. Randy Newman, writer and composer of "I've Been Wrong Before", which Cilla Black recorded in 1965, was quoted as saying: "Cilla Black's 'I've Been Wrong Before' is about the best cover record anyone has ever done of my songs."

Black's version of "You've Lost That Lovin' Feelin'" (1965) reached No. 2 on the UK charts. A week later the Righteous Brothers' original version of the same song went to No. 1 while Black's version dropped to No. 5. The single wasn't critically well received, however; the Rolling Stones' manager Andrew Loog Oldham took out an advert in the Melody Maker to deride Black's efforts compared with the original.

Being so closely associated with the Beatles, Black became one of a select group of artists in the 1964–65 period (the others being Billy J. Kramer & the Dakotas and Peter and Gordon) to record more than one Lennon–McCartney composition. Black continued to record Lennon–McCartney compositions throughout her time with Parlophone (1963–1973) and her recordings of "Yesterday", "For No One" and "Across the Universe" became radio favourites. McCartney said Black's 1972 interpretation of "The Long and Winding Road" was the definitive version of the song.

Black's career in the United States, although enthusiastically supported by Epstein and his PR team, was limited to a few television appearances (The Ed Sullivan Show among them), a 1965 cabaret season at the Plaza Hotel in New York City, and success with "You're My World", which made it to No. 26 on the Billboard Hot 100. The song was to be her only American Top 30 chart success; Elvis Presley had a copy on his personal jukebox at his Graceland home. Black recognised that to achieve popular status in the USA she would need to devote much time to touring there. But she was plagued by homesickness and a sense of loneliness and returned to the UK.

In 1966 Black recorded the Bacharach-David song "Alfie", written as the signature song to the 1966 feature film of the same name. While Cher sang "Alfie" on the closing credits of the American release of the film and Black on the UK version, Black was the only artist to have a hit with the song in the UK (No. 9). The next year, "Alfie" became a success for Dionne Warwick in the US. Black's version of "Alfie" was arranged and conducted by Bacharach himself at the recording session at Abbey Road. Bacharach insisted on 31 separate takes, and Black cited the session as one of the most demanding of her recording career. For Bacharach's part, he said "... there weren't too many white singers around who could convey the emotion that I felt in many of the songs I wrote but that changed with people like Cilla Black".

By the end of 1966, Black had been a guest on Peter Cook and Dudley Moore's show Not Only... But Also, had appeared on The Eamonn Andrews Show, and in a Ray Galton–Alan Simpson revue in London's West End—Way Out in Piccadilly—alongside Frankie Howerd, and had starred in the television special Cilla at the Savoy, which was one of the most watched music specials of the 1960s.

Epstein's attempts to make Black a film actress were less successful. A brief appearance in the beat film Ferry 'Cross the Mersey (1965) and a leading role alongside David Warner in the psychedelic comedy Work Is a Four-Letter Word (1968) were largely ignored by film critics. In a 1997 interview with Record Collector magazine, Black revealed she was asked to appear in the film The Italian Job (1969), playing the part of Michael Caine's girlfriend, but negotiations fell through between producers and her management over her fee.

Epstein died of an accidental drug overdose in August 1967, not long after negotiating a contract with the BBC for Black to appear in a television series of her own. Relations between Epstein and Black had somewhat soured during the year before his death, largely because she felt he was not paying her career enough attention, and her singles "A Fool Am I" (UK No. 13, 1966) and "What Good Am I?" (UK No. 24, 1967) had not been big successes.

In her autobiography, Black said that Epstein had tried to pacify her by negotiating a deal that would see her representing the UK in the 1968 Eurovision Song Contest. However, Black refused as Sandie Shaw had won the previous year's contest, making it unlikely that another British female singer would win.

=== After Brian Epstein ===
Black's boyfriend and songwriter Bobby Willis assumed management responsibilities after Epstein died. After the relatively disappointing performance of "I Only Live to Love You" (UK No. 26, 1967), Black hit a new purple patch in her recording career, starting with "Step Inside Love" in 1968 (UK No. 8), which McCartney wrote especially for her as the theme for her new weekly BBC television variety series. Other successes followed in 1969: "Conversations" (UK No. 7), "Surround Yourself with Sorrow" (written by Bill Martin, Phil Coulter, UK No. 3), "If I Thought You'd Ever Change Your Mind" (No. 20). Black had a further big hit with "Something Tells Me (Something's Gonna Happen Tonight)" (UK No. 3) in 1971.

Black's association with the Beatles continued. At the 1971 Cannes Film Festival she joined George Harrison, Ringo Starr and singer Marc Bolan to attend a screening of the John Lennon–Yoko Ono experimental film Erection. She also holidayed with Harrison and Starr on a trip aboard a yacht chartered by Starr. "Photograph" was written on this trip—originally intended for Black—but Starr decided to record it himself. George Harrison also wrote two songs for Black: "The Light that has Lighted the World" and "I'll Still Love You (When Every Song is Sung)". The latter she recorded during 1974 with her then-producer David Mackay, but it was not heard publicly until 2003 when it was included on a retrospective collection entitled Cilla: The Best of 1963–78.

Writing in 1969, the rock music journalist Nik Cohn wrote:

...she makes people glow. In her time, she will grow into a pop Gracie Fields, much loved entertainer, and she'll become institutionalised.

=== Later music career ===
In 1993 she released Through the Years, an album of new material featuring duets with Dusty Springfield, Cliff Richard and Barry Manilow. Ten years later, in 2003, she released the album Beginnings ... Greatest Hits and New Songs.

During 2006–07, Black's 1971 single "Something Tells Me (Something's Gonna Happen Tonight)" was used as the soundtrack to a new British advertising campaign for Ferrero Rocher chocolates. During the 2008–09 pantomime season, Black returned to live musical performance in the pantomime Cinderella, appearing as the Fairy Godmother. Black was part of an all-Scouse cast assembled in this three-hour stage spectacular to mark the end of Liverpool's year as European Capital of Culture. The show incorporated a number of Black's successes, which she performed live, including "You're My World", "Something Tells Me", "Step Inside Love" and "I Can Sing a Rainbow". Black received rave reviews for her singing and overall performance.

On 7 September 2009, a total of 13 original studio albums (the first seven produced by George Martin) recorded by Black between 1963 and 2003 were released for digital download. These albums featured an array of musical genres. Also released by EMI at the same time was a double album and DVD set, The Definitive Collection (A Life in Music), featuring rare BBC video footage; a digital download album of specially commissioned re-mixes Cilla All Mixed Up; a remixed single on digital download of "Something Tells Me".

For the 2010 winter pantomime season, Black appeared in Cinderella at the Waterside Theatre in Aylesbury, Buckinghamshire.

In October 2013, Parlophone (the record label which launched her career in 1963) released the career-spanning CD The Very Best of Cilla Black—containing all 19 of her UK Top 40 singles, new club remixes plus a bonus DVD of her 1966 TV music special Cilla at the Savoy.

Black was the best-selling British female recording artist in the UK during the 1960s, releasing a total of 15 studio albums and 37 singles.

On 14 February 2020, a previously unreleased Black track titled "You're Sensational" was released via Warner Music.

== Television career ==
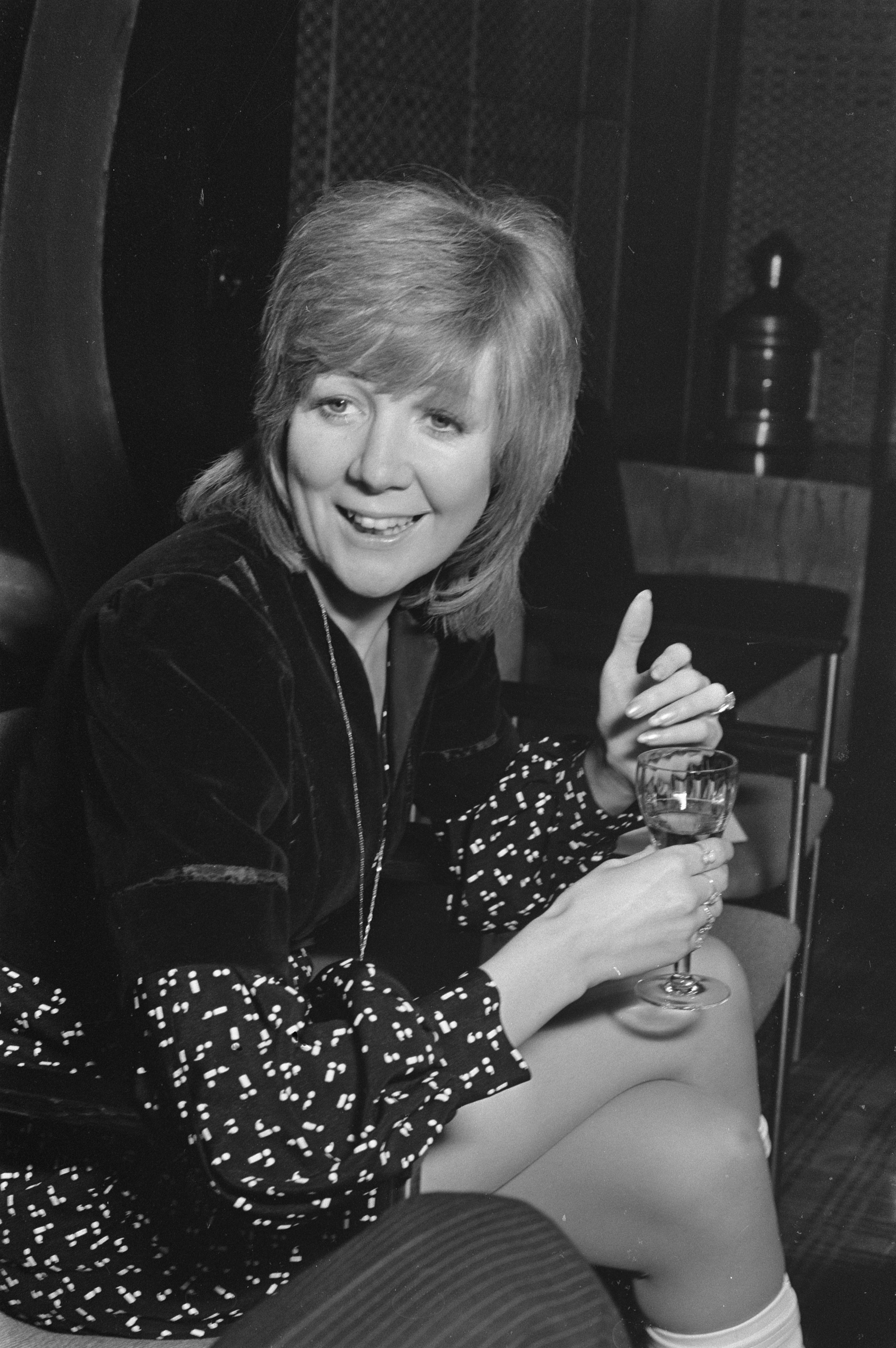
Black in 1970

=== Cilla (BBC TV series) ===
Black was offered her own show on the BBC by Bill Cotton, then assistant head of light entertainment. The show would simply be titled Cilla and aired from January 1968 to April 1976. Cotton considered Black to take over from Bruce Forsyth as host of The Generation Game in 1978, but after a brief conversation, Cotton learned that Black wanted to maintain her singing career and was not ready to change course so drastically to light entertainment hostess. Cotton believed she would have been "perfect" for the show.

=== Comedy ===
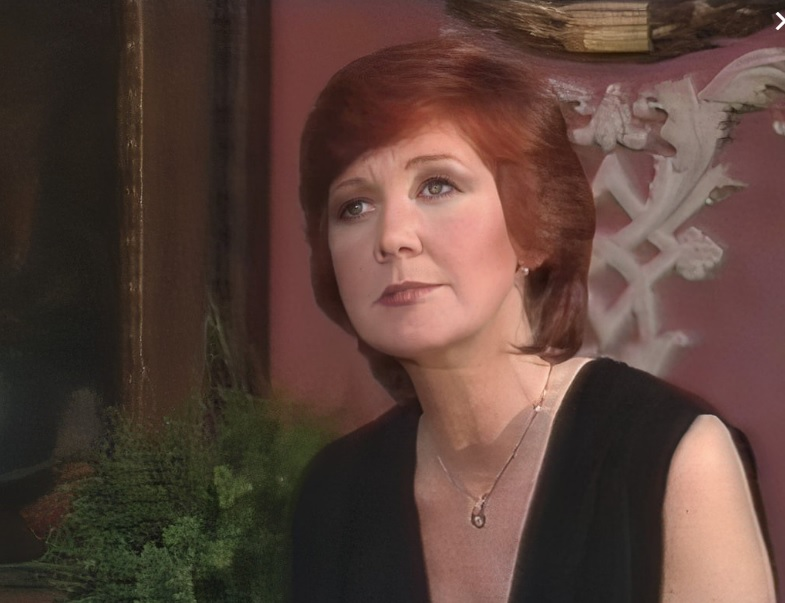
Black performing in The Green Tie on the Little Yellow Dog

On 15 January 1975, Black performed as the main entertainer of the first of six half-hour situation comedy plays. The series, broadcast by ITV, was entitled Cilla's Comedy Six and was written by Ronnie Taylor. During May 1975 the Writers' Guild of Great Britain named Black as Britain's Top Female Comedy Star. The following year, ATV was commissioned to film six more plays as the initial series had accrued healthy viewing figures and remained constantly among the highest-scoring three shows of the week. During August 1976, Black reprised her role as a comedy actress in Cilla's World of Comedy which featured her theme song and new single "Easy in Your Company".

In 2013 it was announced that Black was set to co-star in a new BBC sitcom Led Astray, alongside her friend Paul O'Grady, with the pilot episode recorded on 31 October 2013. However, the show was shelved because the pair were unable to cope with the long hours of filming.

=== London Weekend Television ===
By the beginning of the 1980s Black was performing mainly in cabaret and concerts; television appearances were rare. She sang the Gracie Fields song Walter, Walter (Lead Me to the Altar) on The Green Tie on the Little Yellow Dog, which was recorded in 1982, and broadcast by Channel 4 in 1983.

According to Christopher Biggins's autobiography she "stormed back into the public consciousness with a barnstorming performance as a guest on Wogan in 1983, proving that we can all have second chances" and after her appearance, people were "desperately trying to find her the right comeback vehicle". She presented Cilla Black's Christmas (1983), performing a comedy-duet with Frankie Howerd.

Black signed a contract with London Weekend Television, becoming the host of two of the most popular and long-running evening entertainment shows of the 1980s and 1990s—Blind Date (1985–2003) and Surprise Surprise (1984–2001). She also presented the game show The Moment of Truth (1998–2001). All programmes were mainstream ratings winners and consolidated her position as the highest-paid female performer on British television.

Her television appearances made her spoken mannerisms ("Lorra lorra laughs", for example) and her habit of referring familiarly to her fellow presenters ("Our Graham") well known.

=== Later television work ===
Black's most notable television performances after her resignation from London Weekend Television included Parkinson, So Graham Norton, Friday Night with Jonathan Ross, Room 101 twice (once with Paul Merton and once with his successor as host, Frank Skinner), and a one-off show titled Cilla Live! for Living TV. Black was a judge on the first series of the reality TV series Soapstar Superstar, featured in an episode of the series Eating with... and guest-presented editions of The Paul O'Grady Show in 2006 and The Friday Night Project for Channel 4 in 2007.

In 2006, Black took part in the BBC Wales programme Coming Home about her Welsh family history, with roots in Wrexham and Holywell.

In 2008 Black recorded a pilot for the Sky 1 dating show Loveland. The show was to be a 10-part "21st-century" dating programme for the following year. Unlike Blind Date, contestants would not sit in front of a studio audience, but would be 'hidden' behind real-time animations as they dated each other. Each episode would conclude with the contestant picking their preferred animated character before meeting the real-life person. Production costs, however, were too high and the show was pulled.

In October 2009 Black guest-anchored Loose Women and on 28 November 2009 appeared on Sky 1 to present TV's Greatest Endings.

Between September 2010 and June 2011 she made guest panellist appearances and in 2011 also appeared, as herself, in the first episode of series 4 of ITV's Benidorm.

=== 50 years in showbusiness ===
ITV honoured Black's 50 years in show business with a one-off entertainment special which aired on 16 October 2013. The show, called The One and Only Cilla Black, starred Black alongside Paul O'Grady, who hosted the show. The show celebrated Black's career and included a special trip back to her home city of Liverpool, a host of celebrity friends and some surprise music guests. Black paid homage to Blind Date with the return of its most popular contestants and saw her star in a special edition of Coronation Street.

=== Television biopic ===
In 2014, Black was the subject of a three-part television drama series, Cilla, focusing especially on her rise to fame in 1960s Liverpool and her relationship with Bobby Willis. ITV aired the first instalment on 15 September 2014, starring actress Sheridan Smith as Black.

=== The Lost Tapes ===
A documentary titled Cilla – The Lost Tapes aired on Wednesday 19 February 2020 on ITV, featuring previously unseen career and private family film. Celebrity friends such as Cliff Richard and Christopher Biggins also featured in it.

== Political views ==
Black was at one time a staunch supporter of the Conservative Party and publicly voiced her admiration for Margaret Thatcher, stating in 1993 that Thatcher had "put the 'great' back into Great Britain" during her 11 years as prime minister from 1979 until 1990, despite the widespread unpopularity of Thatcher and her government in Black's native Liverpool. Black attended fund raising events for the Conservative Party. In April 1992, she appeared on stage at a party rally and made prominent calls for the party's re-election under the leadership of Thatcher's successor John Major, who went on to win the election. However, in a 2004 interview with The Guardian, Black said that she was "apolitical". The Liverpool Echo also quoted her as saying, "As for the politics thing, I'm not a Conservative."

In August 2014, Black was one of 200 public figures who were signatories to a letter to The Guardian expressing their hope that Scotland would vote to remain part of the United Kingdom in September's referendum on that issue.

== Personal life ==
Black married her manager, Bobby Willis, at Marylebone Town Hall in January 1969; they were married for 30 years until he died from cancer on 23 October 1999. They had three sons together: Robert, Ben and Jack. Their daughter Ellen lived for only two hours.

== Death ==
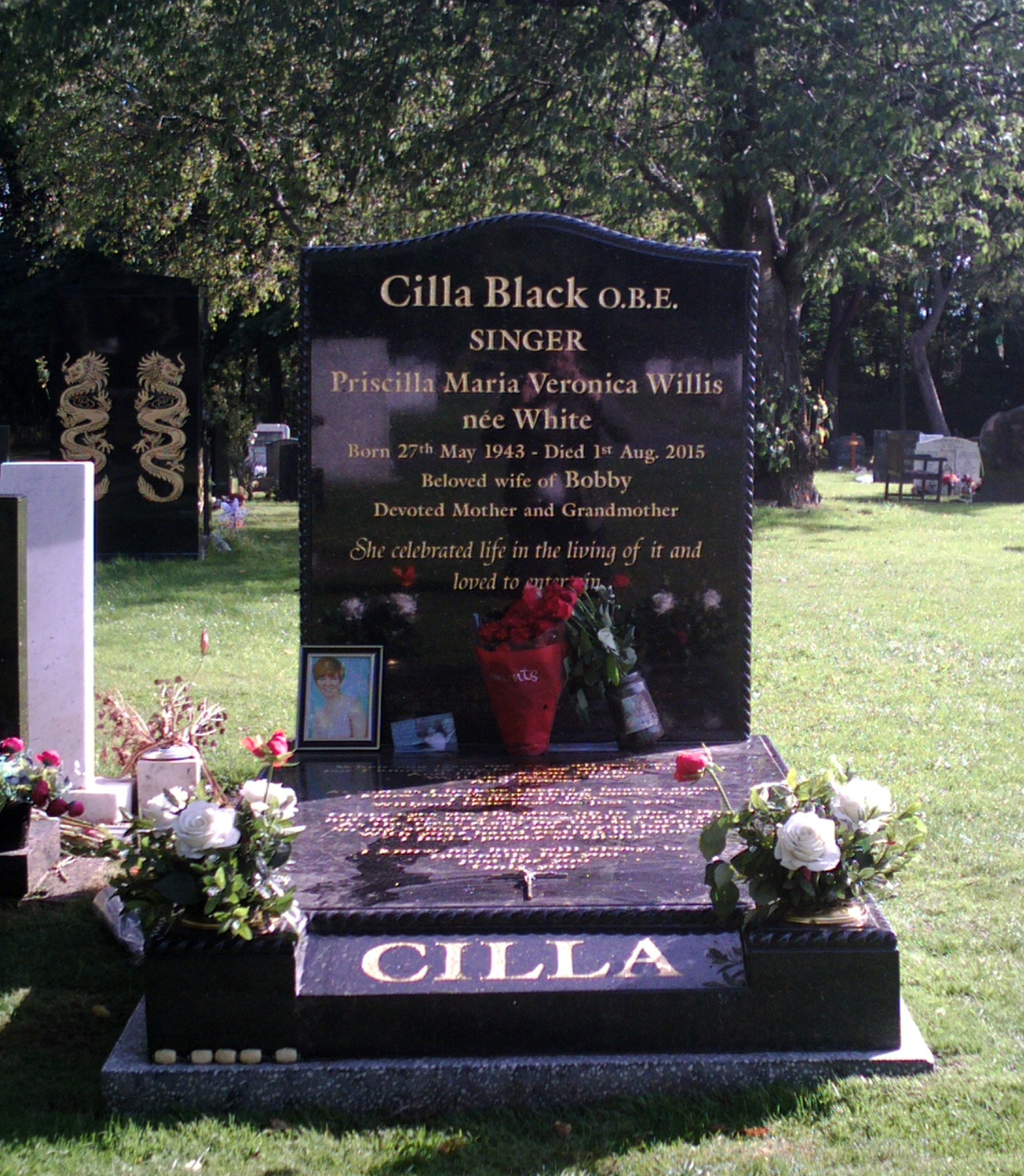
Black's grave at Allerton Cemetery in Allerton

On 1 August 2015, Black died at her holiday home in the Spanish town of Estepona, aged 72. A spokesperson for the High Court of Justice in Andalusia suggested that an accident may have been a contributing factor in Black's death. Following the results of an autopsy, her sons confirmed that she had died from a stroke following a fall in her home. A pathologist's report confirmed that Black had suffered a subarachnoid haemorrhage after falling backwards and hitting her head, presumably on a terrace wall. It was believed she had not been found for at least four hours.

In 2010, she had stated that she wanted to die when she reached 75, as her mother, who suffered from progressive osteoporosis, had lived to 84, and her final years were difficult. According to a friend, she had recently said that she was approaching death, complaining of failing eyesight and hearing, as well as arthritis. Black had been suffering with rheumatoid arthritis for years and was in "considerable agony" towards the end of her life.

In the days following her death, a book of condolence was opened at the Liverpool Town Hall. Then-Prime Minister David Cameron stated, "Cilla Black was a huge talent who made a significant contribution to public life in Britain. My thoughts are with her family." Paul McCartney, Ringo Starr, Sheridan Smith, Holly Johnson, Cliff Richard, and Paul O'Grady were among friends and colleagues in the entertainment industry who expressed their sorrow at Black's death. Comedian Jimmy Tarbuck, who had been a friend for decades, said, "She was the girl next door that everybody loved and would have loved as a daughter, a daughter-in-law." Songwriter Burt Bacharach said, "It will always be a most special memory for me of recording her on 'Alfie' in Abbey Road Studios in 1965." Broadcaster Noel Edmonds said that she "captured the hearts of the British people" because "she was our Cilla—there were no airs and graces".

Black's funeral service was held on 20 August 2015 at St Mary's Church, Woolton. Tom Williams, the Roman Catholic Auxiliary Bishop of Liverpool, led the service; Cliff Richard sang at the service and Paul O'Grady gave a eulogy. Spoken tributes, prayers and readings were made by Black's sons Robert and Ben, Jimmy Tarbuck, and Christopher Biggins. The Beatles song "The Long and Winding Road" was played as the coffin left the church. She was buried in a private ceremony at Allerton Cemetery in Allerton on the same day.

On 21 August 2015, the day after her funeral, The Very Best of Cilla Black (2013), a compilation album of her most popular songs in her career, went to number one on the UK Albums Chart. It was Black's first number one album.

Black's headstone has been the target of vandalism on several occasions. In 2015, thieves stole a bronze plaque inscribed with her name from the site, and in 2020, Black's gravestone was vandalised with graffiti. Liverpool City Council said they were "appalled" by the vandalism.

== Awards and honours ==
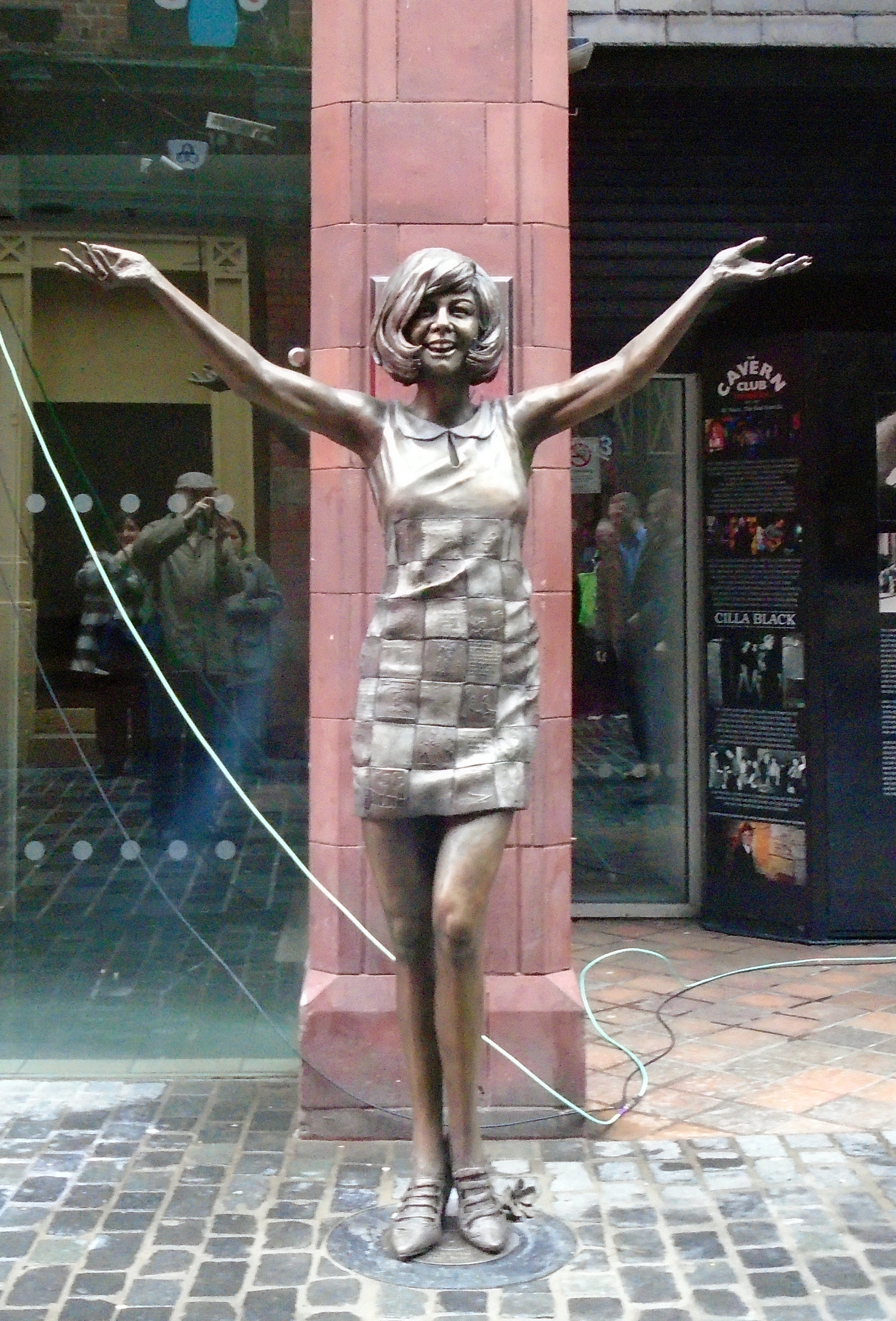
Statue of Black outside the original Cavern Club entrance, unveiled on 16 January 2017

Black was appointed OBE for services to entertainment in the 1997 New Year Honours.

In May 2014, Black was the recipient of the British Academy Television Awards' Special Award and the first Royal Television Society Legends Award in honour of her 50 years in entertainment.

On 16 January 2017, a statue of Black commissioned by her sons was unveiled outside the Cavern Club's original entrance as the venue celebrated its 60th anniversary. "The sculpture shows a young Cilla performing one of her early songs and the design of her dress on the statue features images of her legendary career."

In 2025, her family decided to sell her clothes to mark the 10th anniversary of her death. 246 outfits such as a Thea Porter dress that she wore on the Morecambe and Wise Show were auctioned in Portsmouth, raising about £40,000 for Variety, the Children's Charity.

== Discography ==
=== Albums ===
- Cilla (1965)
- Cilla Sings a Rainbow (1966)
- Sher-oo! (1968)
- Surround Yourself with Cilla (1969)
- Sweet Inspiration (1970)
- Images (1971)
- Day by Day with Cilla (1973)
- In My Life (1974)
- It Makes Me Feel Good (1976)
- Modern Priscilla (1978)
- Especially For You (1980)
- Surprisingly Cilla (1985)
- Cilla's World (1990)
- Through the Years (1993)
- Beginnings: Greatest Hits & New Songs (2003)
- Cilla All Mixed Up (2009)

=== UK Top 10 singles ===
- "Anyone Who Had a Heart" (1964)
- "You're My World" (1964)
- "It's for You" (1964)
- "You've Lost That Lovin' Feelin" (1965)
- "Love's Just a Broken Heart" (1966)
- "Alfie" (1966)
- "Don't Answer Me" (1966)
- "Step Inside Love" (1968)
- "Surround Yourself with Sorrow" (1969)
- "Conversations" (1969)
- "Something Tells Me (Something's Gonna Happen Tonight)" (1971)

== Selected TV credits ==
Year	Programme	Role
1966	Cilla at the Savoy	Presenter
1968–1976	Cilla	Presenter
1975	Cilla's Comedy Six	Christine Bradshaw / Doris Livesey / Linda Pearson / Sally Norton / Thelma Fosset / Vera Clayton
1976	Cilla's World of Comedy	Barbara Norton / Carol Coombes / Christine Bradshaw / Helen Parker / Linda Pearson / Vera Wilkinson
1983	Cilla's Christmas Show	Presenter
1984–2001	Surprise Surprise	Presenter
1985–2003	Blind Date	Presenter
1993	Cilla's Celebrations	Special Guest/Presenter
1998–2001	The Moment of Truth	Presenter
2006	Soapstar Superstar	Judge
2006–2010	The Paul O'Grady Show	Guest presenter and Guest
2007	The Sunday Night Project	Guest presenter
2007, 2013	Room 101	Guest
2009	TV's Greatest Endings	Presenter
2009–14	Loose Women	Regular/Guest Panellist
2012	Cilla's Unswung Sixties	Presenter
2011	Benidorm	Herself
2011	Never Mind the Buzzcocks	Guest presenter
2013	Your Face Sounds Familiar	Guest Judge
2013	The One & Only Cilla Black	Special Guest

== Books ==
=== Autobiographies ===
- Step Inside (1985), London: Dent; ISBN 0-460-04695-0
- Through the Years: My Life in Pictures (1993), London: Headline Book Publishing; ISBN 978-0-7472-7878-8
- What's It All About? (2003), London: Ebury Press; ISBN 0-09-189036-5
