= Anyone Who Had a Heart (song) =

1963 single by Dionne Warwick

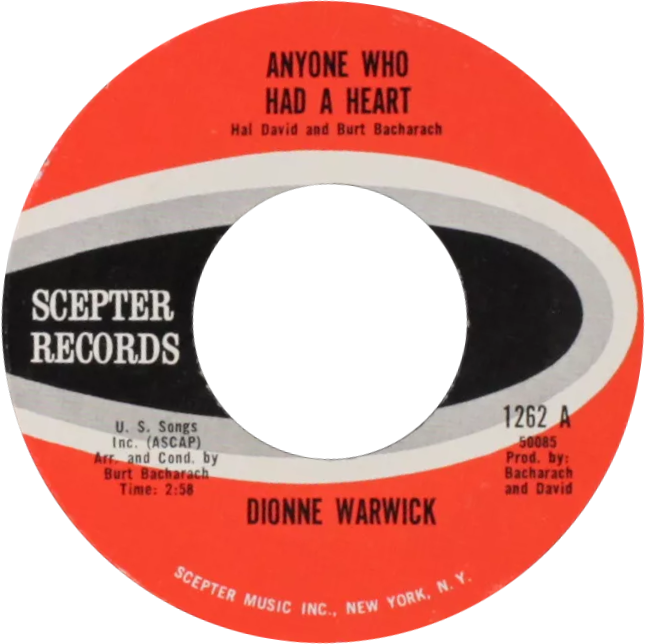
- One of the side-A labels of the US single

Single by Dionne Warwick

from the album Anyone Who Had a Heart
- B-side: "The Love of a Boy"
- Released: November 1963; 1964 (internationally)
- Recorded: November 1963
- Studio: Bell Sound (New York City)
- Genre: Soul; pop
- Length: 3:09
- Label: Scepter
- Songwriters: Burt Bacharach; Hal David
- Producers: Burt Bacharach; Hal David

Dionne Warwick singles chronology
"Make the Music Play" (1963)	"Anyone Who Had a Heart" (1963)	"Walk On By" (1964)

Official audio
- "Anyone Who Had a Heart" on YouTube

"Anyone Who Had a Heart" is a song written by Burt Bacharach (music) and Hal David (lyrics) for Dionne Warwick in 1963. In January 1964, Warwick's original recording hit the Top Ten in the United States, Canada, Spain, Netherlands, South Africa, Belgium and Australia.

In the United Kingdom, Ireland and New Zealand, Warwick's recording lost out to a version by Cilla Black. Black's single was a UK number-one hit for three weeks in February/March 1964 and was also the fourth best-selling single of 1964 in the UK, with sales of around 950,000 copies.

Petula Clark also recorded "Anyone Who Had a Heart" in several foreign language versions for the international market. Clark reached No. 7 in France with "Ceux Qui Ont Un Coeur" in the spring of 1964, then No. 5 in Italy with "Quelli che hanno un cuore" that September. In October 1964, Clark reached No. 1 in Spain—for a two-week period—with "Tú no tienes corazón".

English singer Mary May also recorded a version of the song in early 1964, released on Philips' Fontana label, although the single failed to make any great commercial impact.

== Original recording ==
"Anyone Who Had a Heart" was presented to Dionne Warwick in unfinished form while she, Burt Bacharach and Hal David were rehearsing in Bacharach's Manhattan apartment for an upcoming recording session. Bacharach had finished the score which, in his words, "changes time signature constantly, 4/4 to 5/4, and a 7/8 bar at the end of the song on the turnaround. It wasn't intentional, it was all just natural. That's the way I felt it." David had written only about a third of the lyric and was reluctant to finalize the sixth line of the first stanza as "And know I dream of you", feeling the stress was unnatural (as opposed to "And know I dream of you"). Bacharach played a snippet of the tune for Warwick, who was enraptured and at her urging David left Warwick to rehearse with Bacharach in the living room while he (David) retired to a bedroom where he completed the lyric. Of the unnatural stress in "I dream of you", David later stated: "I tried to find a way to make the you do something and I could never do it...[I] had to let it go."

Warwick recorded "Anyone Who Had a Heart" at Bell Sound Studios in Manhattan in November 1963, in a session produced by Bacharach and engineered by Ed Smith which also yielded "Walk On By" and "In the Land of Make Believe" and included session drummer Gary Chester. According to published reports, Warwick nailed the tune in only one take – though an alternative remix of the take appears on a compilation album released in 1976 by Springboard International.

Released on the Scepter label in November 1963, "Anyone Who Had a Heart" broke in Detroit, where it reached No. 1 that December. The track became Warwick's first Top Ten single in January 1964, peaking at No. 8 on the Billboard Hot 100 and the Cash Box Pop 100 that February, also reaching No. 6 on the Cash Box R&B chart. The track was also a hit in Canada, reaching No. 11 on the hit parade for Toronto radio station CHUM, the country's most influential rock music broadcaster (national charts for Canada were not published during the chart run of "Anyone Who Had a Heart").

=== Chart history ===
Chart performance for "Anyone Who Had a Heart" by Dionne Warwick
Chart (1963–1964)	Peak position
Australia (Kent Music Report)	11
Belgium (Ultratop 50 Flanders)	4
Belgium (Ultratop 50 Wallonia)	17
Canada (CHUM Chart)	11
Germany (GfK)	42
Netherlands (Single Top 100)	5
New Zealand (Listener)	1
UK Singles (Official Charts)	42
US Billboard Hot 100	8
US Hot R&B/Hip-Hop Songs (Billboard)	6
US Adult Contemporary (Billboard)	2
US Cash Box Top 100	8

== Cilla Black version ==
"Anyone Who Had a Heart"

Single by Cilla Black
- B-side: "Just for You"
- Released: January 31, 1964
- Genre: Traditional pop
- Length: 2:50
- Label: Parlophone
- Songwriters: Burt Bacharach; Hal David
- Producer: George Martin

Cilla Black singles chronology
"Love of the Loved" (1963)	"Anyone Who Had a Heart" (1964)	"You're My World" (1964)

A scout for English record producer George Martin discovered "Anyone Who Had a Heart" when Warwick's version took off in the United States, suggesting to Martin that the song would be a strong UK single for Shirley Bassey. However, Martin saw the song as a vehicle for Cilla Black, the Liverpool vocalist whose star potential had yet to be realized despite her association with The Beatles, her recording of the Lennon-McCartney original "Love of the Loved" having been only a modest hit (No. 35). Martin produced the session for Black's recording of "Anyone Who Had a Heart" at Abbey Road Studios; the arrangement was by Johnny Pearson and the session personnel included guitarists Vic Flick and Big Jim Sullivan and backing vocalists The Breakaways.

Black's single of "Anyone Who Had a Heart" debuted at No. 28 on the UK Top 50 dated February 8, 1964. The Dionne Warwick original, issued by Scepter's UK licensee Pye Records, debuted on the chart for the following week at No. 42; by then Black's version had reached No. 10, ascending in the subsequent two weeks to No. 2 and then No. 1, while Warwick's version concurrently ended its chart run with two weeks at No. 47. On the chart dated February 29, 1964, besides Black's "Anyone Who Had a Heart" at No. 1 for the first of three weeks and Warwick's version in its final chart week at No. 47, the UK Top 50 featured a third version of "Anyone Who Had a Heart" as the version by Mary May made its one-week appearance at No. 49. On April 25, 1964, Billboard reported that the sales tally for Black's "Anyone Who Had a Heart" was nearing one million units.

Internationally, Black's version also reached No. 1 in Ireland, where it was the first number one on the official Irish singles chart by a female act, New Zealand and South Africa. In the Netherlands, the song reached No. 6, and in Australia it peaked at No. 34.

In May 2010, research published by BBC Radio 2 revealed that "Anyone Who Had a Heart" by Cilla Black was the biggest female UK chart hit of the 1960s.

Despite the international success and recognition of Warwick's original version, the besting in Great Britain by Black's version has long been a sore point with Warwick. In a 1995 edition of Great Performances which saluted Burt Bacharach, Warwick stated that Black's version of "Anyone Who Had a Heart" replicated Warwick's to the point where had Warwick coughed while recording her vocal for the original track or had that track's organist hit a wrong note, those features would have been present on Black's cover. In fact—whether intentionally or not—Black's original recording features distinct lyrics on the chorus, with Black singing "who couldn't be another heart" rather than the original and standard lyric "you couldn't really have a heart": Black always sang the standard lyric in live performance. Also, arranger Johnny Pearson utilized a bassoon solo for the instrumental break in Black's version as opposed to the saxophone used in the Warwick original.

Cilla Black, interviewed for that Great Performances telecast, expressed her awareness of Warwick's disenchantment: "It was a No. 1; Dionne was dead choked and she's never forgiven me to this day."

It was in fact Burt Bacharach himself who backed Cilla to record this song for a British release, after Dionne Warwick had a hit in America with it. "At one point it looked as if Shirley Bassey would record the song...but The Beatles producer George Martin suggested Cilla and I agreed immediately. It was late in 1963 and Liverpool was taking over popular music with some great songs and great people. There was an awareness that things would never be quite the same again—and Cilla Black was part of that." Bacharach went on to say: "The great thing about the British is that they've always 'got' my songs right away. They are also one of the most loyal audiences in the world. I think Cilla reflected that kind of ability. She understood the song and she had a kind of long-term stickability, which is so very hard to achieve in this business."

Black recorded a new version of "Anyone Who Had a Heart" for her 1993 Through the Years album.

On 7 August 2015, following Black's death, the single re-entered the charts at No. 41.

=== Personnel ===
- Cilla Black – lead vocals
- The Breakaways – backing vocals
- Vic Flick, Big Jim Sullivan – guitar

== Atomic Kitten version ==
"Anyone Who Had a Heart"

Single by Atomic Kitten

from the album Liverpool – The Number Ones Album
- Released: 27 January 2008
- Recorded: 2007
- Genre: Pop-soul
- Length: 3:15
- Label: EMI Music
- Songwriters: Burt Bacharach; Hal David

Atomic Kitten singles chronology
"All Together Now (Strong Together)" (2006)	"Anyone Who Had a Heart" (2008)	"I Wish It Could Be Christmas Everyday" (2013)

Audio video
- "Anyone Who Had A Heart" on YouTube

In late 2007, Liz McClarnon, Natasha Hamilton, and Jenny Frost from English girl band Atomic Kitten recorded a cover version of the song, for the Liverpool – The Number Ones Album. The single was released on 27 January 2008 and peaked at number 77 on the UK Singles Chart.

== International hit ==
In Australia, both Dionne Warwick's and Cilla Black's versions of "Anyone Who Had a Heart" were released as singles: Warwick's version rose as high as No. 11, while Black's peaked at No. 34. Warwick had a hit with "Anyone Who Had a Heart" in Belgium (Flemish Region), the Netherlands and South Africa, reaching No. 4 in each territory.

Petula Clark was on the roster of Pye Records, Warwick's UK label, and therefore in a position to almost immediately cover "Anyone Who Had a Heart" in several foreign language versions for the international market. Clark reached No. 7 in France with "Ceux Qui Ont Un Coeur" in the spring of 1964, then No. 5 in Italy with "Quelli che hanno un cuore"^{1} that September; in October 1964 Clark reached No. 1 in Spain – for a two-week period – with "Tú no tienes corazón".

The success of Petula Clark's translated version did not preclude the Dionne Warwick original reaching No. 7 in Spain; Warwick's version also charted in France at No. 57 and in Italy at No. 30. In Germany, Clark's specialized cover, "Alles ist nun vorbei", was assigned a tandem chart ranking with both the Dionne Warwick and the Cilla Black versions, peaking at No. 37 in May 1964, marking Warwick's sole German chart entry until 1982's "Heartbreaker" and Black's sole German charting ever.

The orchestra on Petula Clark's versions of "Anyone Who Had a Heart" was conducted by Tony Hatch. The instrumentation differs from that of the versions by Dionne Warwick and Cilla Black in utilizing an organ for the solo on the instrumental break rather than a saxophone as on the Warwick original or a bassoon as on Black's cover.

== Other versions ==
Tim Curry recorded the song for his 1978 album Read My Lips. This version was also included on the 1989 compilation The Best of Tim Curry.

The 1982 B.E.F. album Music of Quality and Distinction, Vol. 1 featured a rendering of "Anyone Who Had a Heart" by Sandie Shaw, marking a return to recording by the 1960s hitmaker, although that particular track would not be her comeback vehicle as despite its single release (credited to B.E.F. Presents Sandie Shaw) the track fell short of the UK Top 50; it was a lower chart item (No. 71) in Australia.

Atomic Kitten reunited to remake "Anyone Who Had a Heart" for the 2008 album Liverpool – The Number Ones Album, to which the group member Natasha Hamilton (with Kush) contributed a remake of Cilla Black's subsequent single and No. 1 "You're My World". Issued as a digital single release, "Anyone Who Had a Heart" spent one week on the UK charts at No. 77, the only UK charting of "Anyone Who Had a Heart" since the Cilla Black version.

On August the 29th 2025, Belinda Carlisle released her first English language studio album in 29 years "Once Upon A Time In California" which includes a version of this song.

Luther Vandross recorded it in 1986 on his ''Give Me the Reason album.
