= Matt Monro discography =

- Studio albums: 22
- EPs: 8
- Live albums: 5
- Compilation albums: 23
- Singles: 60
- Spanish-language singles: 8

The discography of English singer Matt Monro consists of 22 studio albums, five live albums, 23 compilation albums, eight extended plays, and 68 singles. He released 18 studio albums in English prior to his death in 1985, with his first, Blue and Sentimental, released in 1957. A posthumous album was released in 1995 consisting of duets recorded by Monro's son Matt Monro Jnr combined with his father's voice, entitled Matt Sings Monro. Monro also released three albums of recordings in Spanish; his first was Alguien cantó in 1969; his second, released a year later, was an adaptation of his English album Close to You, entitled Todos hablan cantado en castellano; and his third was Un toque de distinción, released in 1982. In total, 60 singles sung in English were released by Monro as well as eight sung in Spanish.

Most of Monro's recordings were produced or overseen by George Martin. Unlike his contemporaries, Monro recorded very few Tin Pan Alley standards during his career (the exception was Matt Monro Sings Hoagy Carmichael, one of his most highly regarded albums). Instead, he and Martin searched for material written by promising newcomers and commissioned English lyrics for dramatic melodies written by European composers.

Monro also covered many of the most popular stage and screen songs of the 1950s and 1960s. Over the years, his recordings featured arrangements by Sid Feller, Billy May, John Barry, Buddy Bregman, Kenny Clayton and Colin Keyes, and Martin himself. He also had a long and fruitful musical partnership with British arranger Johnnie Spence. Monro also teamed up with American star arrangers Nelson Riddle and Billy May and leading British bandleader Ted Heath, for concerts broadcast by the BBC.

In 1973, Monro released a vocal version of the popular Van der Valk television series theme, "Eye Level", titled "And You Smiled", with lyrics written by Melvyn Taggart. It was his final hit. In 1977, he recorded the Don Black penned, "If I Never Sing Another Song", which became a latter-day standard among his contemporaries, its lyrics referring to the "heyday" of fan mail, awards, and other trappings of celebrity that had faded for them.

In 1979, Monro recorded his final studio album, the third all-Spanish album, produced by Leonardo Schultz and Gary Mason. Schultz and Mason hoped to capitalise on the success of the earlier hit song "Alguien cantó", which Leonardo Schultz had adapted to Spanish. The album, entitled Un toque de distinción, was recorded in George Martin's Air London Studios as well as in Miami, Los Angeles, and New York, and was eventually released in 1982. The album was a critical success and was a hit in various Latin American countries. The song "Volveré alguna vez" from the album made it on to the singles chart, and was subsequently sung by José Feliciano and became a hit.

== Albums ==
=== Studio albums ===
Title	Album details	Peak chart positions		
Title	Album details	UK	SPA	US
Blue and Sentimental	Released: April 1957; Label: Decca; Formats: LP	—	—	—
Love Is the Same Anywhere	Released: September 1961; Label: Parlophone, Warwick; Formats: LP; Released in the US with a different track listing as My Kind of Girl	—	—	87
Matt Monro Sings Hoagy Carmichael	Released: November 1962; Label: Parlophone; Formats: LP	—	—	—
From Russia with Love	Released: April 1964; Label: Liberty; Formats: LP; US album	—	—	—
Walk Away	Released: January 1965; Label: Liberty; Formats: LP; US album	—	—	126
I Have Dreamed	Released: June 1965; Label: Parlophone; Formats: LP, reel-to-reel	20	—	—
All My Loving	Released: September 1965; Label: Liberty; Formats: LP; US album	—	—	—
Yesterday	Released: January 1966; Label: Liberty; Formats: LP; US album	—	—	—
This Is the Life!	Released: August 1966; Label: Capitol; Formats: LP, reel-to-reel	25	—	—
Here's to My Lady	Released: 7 November 1966; Label: Capitol; Formats: LP	—	—	—
Born Free – Invitation to the Movies	Released: April 1967; Label: Capitol; Formats: LP	30	—	86
These Years	Released: August 1967; Label: Capitol; Formats: LP	—	—	—
Invitation to Broadway	Released: December 1967; Label: Capitol; Formats: LP, reel-to-reel	—	—	—
The Late Late Show	Released: May 1968; Label: Capitol, Pickwick; Formats: LP, reel-to-reel; Released in the US with a different track listing as This Is All I Ask	—	—	—
Alguien cantó	Released: 1969; Label: Capitol; Formats: LP; Sung in Spanish; released in Spain and Latin America	—	2	—
Close to You	Released: August 1970; Label: Capitol; Formats: LP, reel-to-reel; Released in the UK as We're Gonna Change the World in November 1970; A Spanish-language version titled Todos hablan cantado en castellano was also released in South America	—	—	—
For the Present	Released: May 1973; Label: Columbia; Formats: LP, MC	—	—	—
The Other Side of the Stars	Released: April 1975; Label: Columbia; Formats: LP, MC	—	—	—
The Long and Winding Road	Released: November 1975; Label: EMI; Formats: LP, MC	—	—	—
If I Never Sing Another Song	Released: March 1979; Label: EMI; Formats: LP, MC	—	—	—
Un toque de distinción	Released: 1982; Label: RCA; Formats: LP, MC; Sung in Spanish; released in Spain and Latin America	—	—	—
Matt Sings Monro	Released: May 1995; Label: EMI; Formats: CD, MC; Posthumous duet album with Matt Monro Jnr	104	—	—
"—" denotes releases that did not chart or were not released in that territory.

=== Live albums ===
Title	Album details
Matt Sings Nelson Swings	Released: 28 April 2008; Label: EMI; Formats: CD; With Nelson Riddle
Live in Australia	Released: 23 September 2008; Label: EMI; Formats: CD
Yesterday – The Legendary Manila Concerts	Released: 3 November 2008; Label: Night Owl Music; Formats: CD
Matt at the BBC	Released: 4 May 2009; Label: EMI; Formats: CD+DVD
Operation Santa Claus: Live in Hong Kong, 1962	Released: 8 February 2015; Label: Mint Audio; Formats: CD

=== Compilation albums ===
Title	Album details	Peak chart positions	Certifications
Title	Album details	UK	Certifications
Hits of Yesterday	Released: December 1965; Label: Parlophone; Formats: LP, reel-to-reel	—	
The Very Best of Matt Monro	Released: July 1974; Label: Columbia; Formats: LP, MC, 8-track	—	UK: Platinum
Heartbreakers – 20 Golden Greats from Matt Monro	Released: 29 February 1980; Label: EMI; Formats: LP, MC	5	UK: Gold
More Heartbreakers – 18 Golden Love Songs from Matt Monro	Released: October 1984; Label: EMI; Formats: LP, MC	—	
Softly As I Leave You	Released: 1987; Label: Music for Pleasure; Formats: CD	—	UK: Silver
This Is...	Released: 1 November 1993; Label: Music for Pleasure; Formats: 2×CD, 2×MC	83	UK: Silver
Complete Heartbreakers – 38 Golden Greats from Matt Monro	Released: 28 October 1996; Label: EMI/Capitol; Formats: 2×CD; Comprises the 1980 Heartbreakers and 1984 More Heartbreakers	—	UK: Silver
Songs of Love	Released: 12 October 1998; Label: EMI; Formats: 3×CD	—	UK: Silver
The Singer's Singer	Released: 5 November 2001; Label: EMI; Formats: 4×CD	—	
The Collection	Released: 19 April 2004; Label: EMI; Formats: 2×CD	—	UK: Silver
The Ultimate Matt Monro	Released: 31 January 2005; Label: EMI; Formats: CD	7	UK: Gold
The Rare Munro	Released: 4 September 2006; Label: EMI; Formats: CD	—	
From Matt with Love	Released: 5 February 2007; Label: EMI; Formats: CD	30	
The Complete Singles Collection	Released: 25 January 2010; Label: EMI; Formats: 5×CD	—	
The Greatest	Released: 1 March 2010; Label: EMI; Formats: CD	28	
Words and Music	Released: 7 February 2011; Label: EMI; Formats: 4×CD; Comprises Matt Monro Sings Hoagy Carmichael and excerpts from Munro's biography The Singer's Singer	—	
Matt Uncovered – The Rarer Monro	Released: 13 August 2012; Label: EMI; Formats: 2×CD	—	
Alternate Munro	Released: 16 September 2013; Label: Parlophone; Formats: CD	—	
The Rarities Collection	Released: 21 October 2013; Label: Parlophone; Formats: 3×CD	—	
The George Martin Years	Released: 5 August 2016; Label: Parlophone; Formats: CD	—	
That Old Feeling – The Complete Recordings 1955–1962	Released: 11 November 2016; Label: Jasmine; Formats: CD	—	
Stranger in Paradise – The Lost New York Sessions	Released: 13 March 2020; Label: UMC; Formats: 2×CD	8	
Matt Monro – The Complete EMI Recordings 1971–1984	Released: 23 June 2023; Label: Strawberry; Formats: 4×CD	—	
"—" denotes releases that did not chart or were not released in that territory.

== EPs ==
Title	EP details	Peak chart positions
Title	EP details	UK
Matt Monro	Released: September 1961; Label: Parlophone; Formats: 7"	—
Matt's Kind of Music	Released: February 1962; Label: Parlophone; Formats: 7"	—
The Monro Style	Released: September 1962; Label: Parlophone; Formats: 7"	—
From Russia with Love	Released: 1 November 1963; Label: Parlophone; Formats: 7"	—
A Song for Europe	Released: 7 February 1964; Label: Parlophone; Formats: 7"	16
Walk Away	Released: December 1964; Label: Parlophone; Formats: 7"	—
Somewhere	Released: April 1965; Label: Parlophone; Formats: 7"	19
I Have Dreamed	Released: March 1966; Label: Parlophone; Formats: 7"	—
"—" denotes releases that did not chart.

== Singles ==
Title	Year	Peak chart positions							UK Album
Title	Year	UK	AUS	IRE	NZ	SA	US	US AC	UK Album
"Ev'rybody Falls in Love with Someone" b/w "Out of Sight, Out of Mind"	1956	—	—	—	—	—	—	—	Non-album singles
"The Garden of Eden" b/w "Love Me Do"	1957	—	—	—	—	—	—	—	Non-album singles
"My House Is Your House (Mi casa su casa)" b/w "The Bean Song (Which Way to Boston)"	1957	—	—	—	—	—	—	—	Non-album singles
"A Story of Ireland" b/w "Another Time Another Place"	1958	—	—	—	—	—	—	—	Non-album singles
"Prisoner of Love" b/w "Have Guitar, Will Travel"	1958	—	—	—	—	—	—	—	Non-album singles
"Love Walked In" b/w "I'll Know Her"	1960	—	—	—	—	—	—	—	Non-album singles
"Portrait of My Love" b/w "You're the Top of My Hit Parade"	1960	3	93	2	5	—	—	—	Non-album singles
"The Ghost of Your Past" b/w "Quite Suddenly"	1961	—	—	—	—	—	—	—	Non-album singles
"My Kind of Girl" b/w "This Time"	1961	5	29	5	5	—	18	6	Non-album singles
"Can This Be Love" b/w "Why Not Now"	1961	24	—	—	—	—	— 92	—	Non-album singles
"Gonna Build a Mountain" b/w "I'll Dream of You"	1961	44	—	—	—	—	—	—	Non-album single Love Is the Same Anywhere
"The Thing About Love" (Note: "The Thing About Love" was only released as a single in Canada.) b/w "I'll Dream of You"	1961	—	—	—	—	—	—	—	Love Is the Same Anywhere
"Softly as I Leave You" b/w "Is There Anything I Can Do"	1962	10	—	9	—	—	116	—	Non-album singles
"When Love Comes Along" b/w "Tahiti"	1962	46	—	—	—	—	—	—	Non-album singles
"My Love and Devotion" b/w "By the Way"	1962	29	—	—	—	—	—	—	Non-album singles
"One Day" b/w "I've Got Love"	1963	—	—	—	—	—	—	—	Non-album singles
"The Girl I Love" b/w "Leave Me Now"	1963	—	—	—	—	—	—	—	Non-album singles
"From Russia with Love" b/w "Here and Now"	1963	20	—	—	—	—	—	—	From Russia with Love (soundtrack) I Have Dreamed
"I Love the Little Things" b/w "It's Funny How You Know"	1964	—	—	—	—	—	—	—	Non-album singles
"I Love You Too" b/w "Somewhere"	1964	—	—	—	—	—	—	—	Non-album singles
"Walk Away" b/w "Around the World"	1964	4	6	3	6	—	23	5	Non-album singles
"For Mama" b/w "Going Places"	1964	23	—	—	—	—	135	—	Non-album singles
"Without You" b/w "Start Living"	1965	37	73	—	—	—	101	—	Non-album single I Have Dreamed
"Before You Go" b/w "And Roses and Roses"	1965	—	—	—	—	—	—	—	Non-album singles
"Yesterday" b/w "Just Yesterday (Mine Your Love Was Mine)"	1965	8	98	8	—	11	—	—	Non-album singles
"Beyond the Hill" b/w "How Do You Do"	1966	—	—	—	—	—	—	—	Non-album singles
"Born Free" b/w "Other People"	1966	—	4	—	—	5	126	35	Born Free (soundtrack) Non-album track
"Honey on the Vine" b/w "My Best Girl"	1966	53	74	—	—	—	—	—	This Is the Life!
"Wednesday's Child" b/w "When You Become a Man"	1966	—	—	—	—	14	—	—	Born Free – Invitation to the Movies Non-album track
"Where in the World" b/w "The Lady Smiles"	1967	—	—	—	—	—	—	— 11	Non-album single
"What to Do?" b/w "These Years"	1967	—	—	—	—	—	—	22	These Years
"Pretty Polly" b/w "Release Me"	1967	—	—	—	—	—	—	—	A Matter of Innocence (soundtrack) These Years
"Fourth Blue Monday" (Note: "Fourth Blue Monday" was only released as a single in the US, Canada and Belgium.) b/w "Only the Night Wind Knows"	1967	—	—	—	—	—	—	—	Non-album singles
"One Day Soon" b/w "Yours Alone (Ce soir ou jamais)"	1968	—	—	—	—	—	—	—	Non-album singles
"The Music Played" b/w "All That Remains"	1968	—	25	—	—	—	—	15	Non-album singles
"The Impossible Dream" b/w "Come Back to Me"	1968	—	—	—	—	—	—	—	Invitation to Broadway
"When Joanna Loved Me" (Note: "When Joanna Loved Me" was only released as a single in several territories, including the US, Canada, Australia and the Philippines.) b/w "Real Live Girl"	1969	—	—	—	—	—	—	—	Here's to My Lady
"All of a Sudden" b/w "That's the Way It Goes"	1969	—	—	—	—	—	—	—	Non-album singles
"Try to Remember" (Note: "Try to Remember" was only released as a single in the US and Canada.) b/w "Love Song"	1969	—	—	—	—	—	—	—	Non-album singles
"Southern Star" b/w "When I Fall in Love"	1969	—	—	—	—	—	—	—	The Southern Star (soundtrack) The Late Late Show
"On Days Like These" b/w "On a Clear Day (You Can See Forever)"	1969	—	—	—	—	—	—	—	The Italian Job (soundtrack) This Is the Life!
"Just a Heartbreak Ago" b/w "Picking Up the Pieces"	1970	—	—	—	—	—	—	—	Non-album single
"We're Gonna Change the World Again" b/w "You're Closer to Me"	1970	—	—	—	—	—	—	—	We're Gonna Change the World Non-album track
"If There Ever Is a Next Time" b/w "You've Made Me So Very Happy"	1970	—	—	—	—	—	—	—	We're Gonna Change the World
"He Ain't Heavy, He's My Brother" (Note: "He Ain't Heavy, He's My Brother" was only released as a single in several territories including Australia, Hong Kong and Belgium.) b/w "We're Gonna Change the World"	1970	—	72	—	—	—	—	—	We're Gonna Change the World
"Isn't It a Pity" b/w "Mama Packed a Picnic Tea"	1971	—	—	—	—	—	—	—	Non-album singles
"This Way Mary" b/w "Wish Now Was Then"	1972	—	—	—	—	—	—	—	Non-album singles
"Sarah's Coming Home" b/w "Only Friends"	1972	—	—	—	—	—	—	—	For the Present Non-album track
"Curiouser and Curiouser" b/w "The Me I Never Knew"	1972	—	—	—	—	—	—	—	For the Present
"I Am in Life" b/w "I Am"	1973	—	—	—	—	—	—	—	Non-album single For the Present
"And You Smiled" b/w "There Ya Go"	1973	28	100	—	—	—	—	—	Non-album singles
"Darling Come Home Soon" b/w "How Could I Ever Leave You"	1974	—	—	—	—	—	—	—	Non-album singles
"You and Me Against the World" b/w "So Little Time"	1975	—	—	—	—	—	—	—	The Long and Winding Road Non-album track
"All the Wishing in the World" b/w "You're Sensational"	1975	—	—	—	—	—	—	—	Non-album singles
"The Little Things" b/w "By Her Side"	1976	—	—	—	—	—	—	—	Non-album singles
"If I Never Sing Another Song" b/w "We're Gonna Change the World"	1979	—	—	—	—	—	—	—	If I Never Sing Another Song We're Gonna Change the World
"Warsaw Concerto Theme from "The Sea Wolves": The Precious Moments" b/w "May Each Day"	1980	—	—	—	—	—	—	—	The Sea Wolves (soundtrack) If I Never Sing Another Song
"Diana" b/w "Beyond the Hill"	1981	—	—	—	—	—	—	—	Non-album singles
"You Bring Out the Best in Me" b/w "Don't Want to Run Your Life"	1984	—	—	—	—	—	—	—	Non-album singles
"We're Gonna Change the World" (all tracks with Matt Monro Jnr) b/w "He Ain't Heavy He's My Brother" / "Born Free"	1995	100	—	—	—	—	—	—	Matt Sings Monro
"—" denotes releases that did not chart or were not released in that territory.

=== Spanish-language singles ===
Title	Year	Peak chart positions
Title	Year	SPA
"Alguien cantó" ("The Music Played") b/w "De repente un día" ("One Day Soon")	1968	4
"Todo pasara" ("Everything Will Happen") b/w "Lo que quedó" ("All That Remains")	1969	3
"No puedo quitar mis ojos de ti" ("Can't Take My Eyes Off You") b/w "Nacida libre" ("Born Free")	1969	3
"Que tonto fui" b/w "En días como estos" ("On Days Like These")	1969	13
"Sueño imposible" ("The Impossible Dream") b/w "Los dos" ("Two People")	1970	—
"A mi manera" ("My Way") b/w "Ven mi amor" ("Wednesday's Child")	1970	—
"Amor háblame dulcemente" ("Love Theme from The Godfather") b/w "Los dos" ("Two People")	1972	—
"Volveré alguna vez" b/w "Con mi canción" ("I Write the Songs")	1982	—
"—" denotes releases that did not chart or were not released in that territory.
