= The Italian Job (disambiguation) =

The Italian Job is a 1969 film directed by Peter Collinson.

The Italian Job may also refer to:

- The Italian Job (charity event), an annual European car run inspired by the 1969 film
- The Italian Job (soundtrack), a soundtrack album from the 1969 film, by Quincy Jones
- The Italian Job (2003 film), a remake of the 1969 film, directed by F. Gary Gray
- The Italian Job (2001 video game), based on the 1969 film
- The Italian Job (2003 video game), based on the 2003 film
- "The Italian Job" (2point4 Children), a television episode
- Amanda and Alan's Italian Job, a British lifestyle television series hosted by Amanda Holden and Alan Carr
- Players (2012 film), an official Indian remake of the 1969 film, by Abbas and Mustan Burmawalla
