= Nivolet Pass =

Mountain pass in the Graian Alps

- Colle del Nivolet (in Italian); Col du Nivolet (in French)
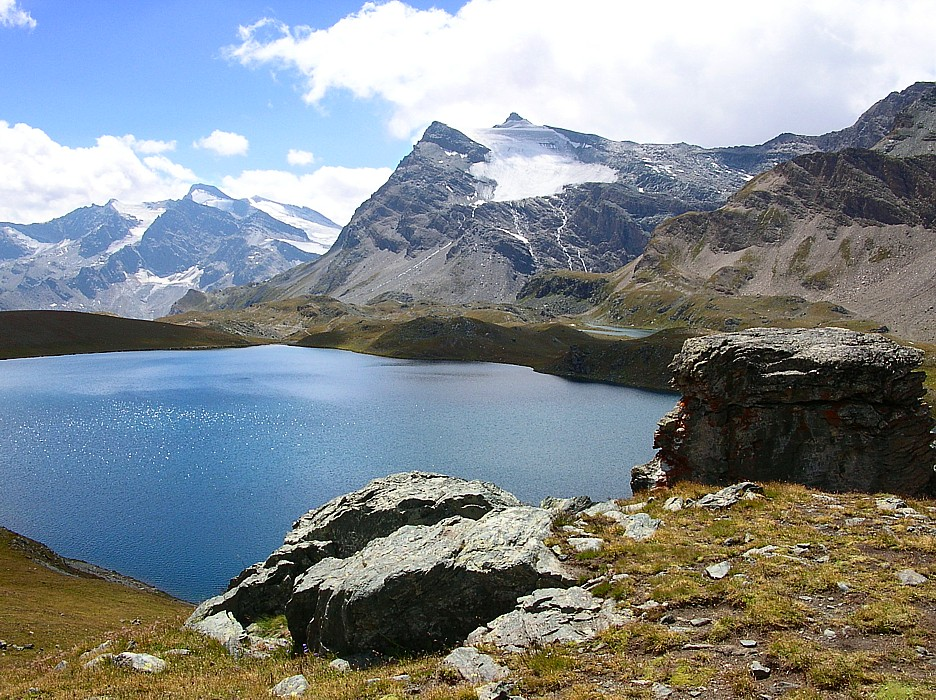
- Looking towards the Nivolet Pass from the Rosset and Leita lakes

- Location within Alps
- Elevation: 2,641 m (8,665 ft)
- Traversed by: SP50

Location
- Location: Aosta Valley and Piedmont, Italy
- Range: Graian Alps
- Coordinates: 45°28′49″N 7°08′32″E

The Nivolet Pass ([nivɔlɛ]; Italian: Colle del Nivolet or French: Col du Nivolet) is a mountain pass in the Eastern group of the Graian Alps in northern Italy. It is located at the top of the Orco Valley on the road from Turin to Ceresole Reale, in the Gran Paradiso National Park. Beyond the pass, the road terminates in the upper reaches of the eponymous Valsavarenche valley in the Gran Paradiso mountain group, before the valley descends to Valsavarenche and Villeneuve. The colle forms part of the boundary between the Aosta Valley and the Piedmont region. The highest point of the paved road is 2,641 m (8,665 ft).

Two artificial lakes, Serrù Lake and Agnel Lake, are located immediately below the pass. Mountain hiking is a popular pastime around the two lakes and at the Pass.

The approach road from Agnel Lake was the location of several scenes in the film The Italian Job, including the iconic final bus crash.

== See also ==
- List of highest paved roads in Europe
- List of mountain passes

== Gallery ==
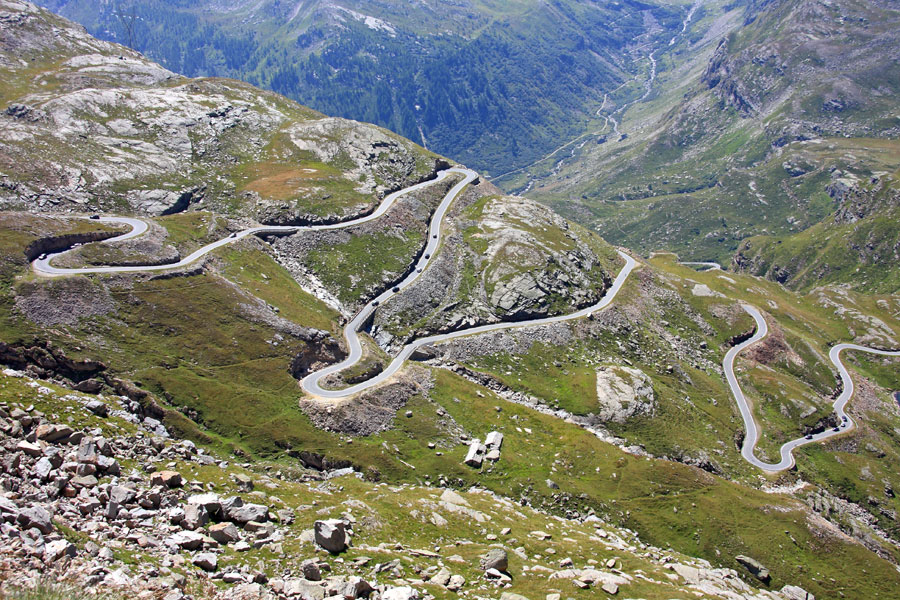
The road between the Agnel Lake and the Nivolet Pass

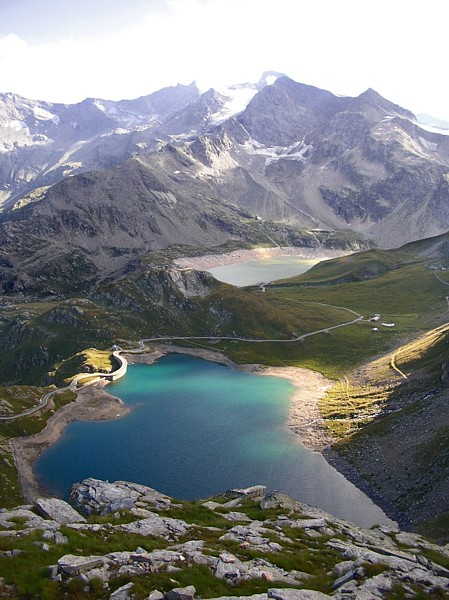
Agnel Lake and Serrù Lake from the Nivolet Pass

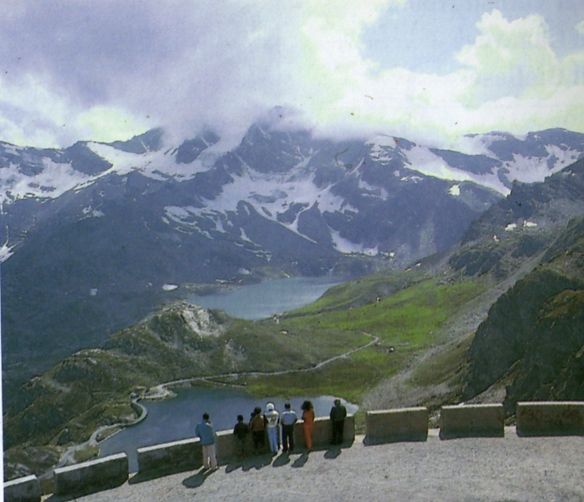
Agnel Lake and Serrù Lake seen from Nivolet Pass
