= John Gary discography =

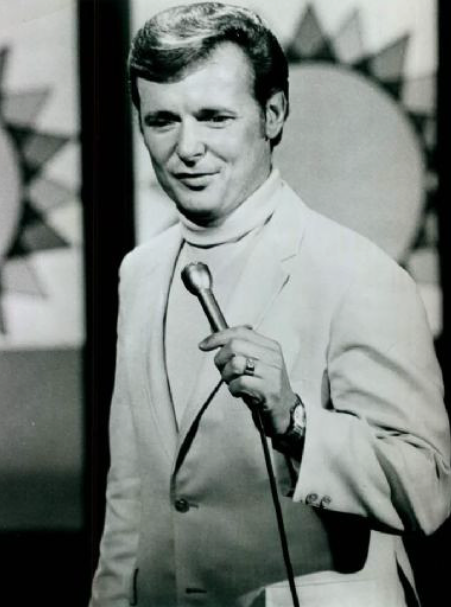
- Gary singing on The John Gary Show
- Studio albums: 23
- EPs: 2
- Live albums: 2
- Compilation albums: 3
- Singles: 23
- Collaboration albums: 1
- Promotional singles: 1

This is the discography of American pop and easy listening singer John Gary. Shown below are only his solo releases. It contains 23 studio albums, 3 compilation albums, 25 singles and several other releases. Gary's first few singles and his debut album for La Brea went unnoticed, but he gained prominence after signing RCA Victor Records in 1963.

His debut for the label was Catch a Rising Star, which quickly reached the top-20 of the pop charts, and it received a nomination for Best Vocal Performance, Male in 1964. Gary's next release for RCA was Encore, and sales there increased, and with charts compiled by Cashbox it almost cracked the top-5. His single "Soon I'll Wed My Love" was his only single to reach the Billboard Hot 100, at number 89. This was followed by a Christmas album and a collaboration with Ann-Margret in 1964 as well. Gary would achieve similar chart success in 1965 and 1966, though his sales would start to decrease by 1967.

The label would issue his first live album that year. Carnegie Hall Concert was his final big chart success, climbing to the top-60. The single "Cold" topped the Billboard Easy Listening chart, and also proved to be his final charting single. Love of a Gentle Woman, featuring more contemporary material, became his final chart release in early 1969. His recordings have been reissued multiple times on CDs and digital streaming platforms through the decades.

== Albums ==
=== Studio albums ===
List of studio albums, showing all relevant details
Year	Title	Peak chart positions		Record Label
Year	Title	Billboard 200	Cashbox 100	Record Label
1961	John Gary	—	—	La Brea
1963	Catch a Rising Star	20	9	RCA Victor
1964	Encore	16	8	RCA Victor
1964	So Tenderly	42	24	RCA Victor
1964	The John Gary Christmas Album	—	—	RCA Victor
1964	David Merrick Presents Hits from His Hits with Ann-Margret	—	—	RCA Victor
1965	A Little Bit of Heaven	17	18	RCA Victor
1965	The Nearness of You	11	18	RCA Victor
1965	Your All-Time Favorite Songs	21	33	RCA Victor
1966	Choice	51	33	RCA Victor
1966	Your All-Time Country Favorites	65	80	RCA Victor
1966	A Heart Filled with Song	73	30	RCA Victor
1966	The One and Only John Gary	—	—	RCA Camden
1967	Especially for You	117	65	RCA Victor
1967	Spanish Moonlight	90	79	RCA Victor
1968	On Broadway	—	—	RCA Victor
1968	That Warm and Tender Glow	—	—	RCA Camden
1968	John Gary Sings / John Gary Swings	—	—	RCA Victor
1968	Holding Your Mind	—	100	RCA Victor
1969	Love of a Gentle Woman	192	—	RCA Victor
1969	That's the Way It Was	—	—	RCA Victor
1975	Constantly	—	—	Kapp / Kama Sutra
1977	In a Class by Himself	—	—	Churchill
"—" denotes releases that did not chart.

=== Compilation albums ===
List of compilation albums, showing all relevant details
Title	Album details
The Best of John Gary	Released: 1967; Label: RCA Victor Records; Formats: LP
This Is John Gary	Released: 1971; Label: RCA Victor; Formats: LP, 2-record set
Sincerely Yours	Released: 1984; Label: RCA International; Formats: CD

=== Live albums ===
List of live albums, showing all relevant details
Title	Album details	Peak chart positions	
Title	Album details	US 200	CB 100
Carnegie Hall Concert	Released: 1967; Label: RCA Victor Records; Formats: LP	76	60
On Tour	Released: 1985; Label: Briarwood; Formats: LP, CD	—	—

== Singles ==
=== As lead artist ===
List of singles, with selected chart positions, showing other relevant details
Single	Year	Chart Positions		Album
Single	Year	US AC	US Pop	Album
"I Thought I Had You"	1962	—	—	John Gary
"First Lady Waltz"	1962	—	—	Non LP-tracks
"That's Life"	1964	—	—	Non LP-tracks
"Warm and Willing"	1964	—	—	The One and Only
"Soon I'll Wed My Love"	1964	19	89	That Warm and Tender Glow
"Do You Hear What I Hear"	1964	—	—	The John Gary Christmas Album
"Sunrise, Sunset"	1964	—	—	Carnegie Hall Concert
"Yellow Bird"	1965	—	—	Catch a Rising Star
"The Color of Love"	1965	—	—	Non LP-tracks
"A Quiet Thing"	1965	—	—	Non LP-tracks
"Linger Awhile"	1965	—	—	That Warm and Tender Glow
"Don't Throw the Roses Away"	1965	21	132	That Warm and Tender Glow
"Let Them Talk"	1966	—	—	Non-LP tracks
"Don't Let the Music Play"	1966	24	—	Non-LP tracks
"You've Never Kissed Her"	1966	—	—	On Broadway
"Sleeping Beauty"	1967	—	—	Non-LP tracks
"Everybody Say Peace"	1967	10	—	Non-LP tracks
"Cold"	1967	1	—	Non-LP tracks
"Give Some Time to Happy"	1968	—	—	Non-LP tracks
"Love of a Gentle Woman"	1969	—	—	Love of a Gentle Woman
"Then She's a Lover"	1969	—	—	Non-LP tracks
"Natalie"	1969	—	—	Non-LP tracks
"In the Wind"	1970	—	—	Non-LP tracks
"San Diego"	1972	—	—	Non-LP tracks
"All of My Life"	1972	—	—	Non-LP tracks
