= Portrait (Rick Astley album) =

Studio album by Rick Astley
- Released: 17 October 2005
- Recorded: September 2004 – July 2005
- Studio: The Village Recorder (Los Angeles, California)
- Genre: Adult contemporary, pop
- Length: 41:38
- Label: RCA, Sony BMG
- Producer: Peter Collins

Rick Astley chronology
Artist Collection: Rick Astley (2004)	Portrait (2005)	Collections (2006)

Portrait is the sixth studio album by English singer Rick Astley released in 2005. A collection of covers of pop standards, it is his first studio album since 2001's Keep It Turned On, and the first to be released in the UK since 1993's Body & Soul.

Professional ratings
Review scores
Source	Rating
MSN Music	0.5/5 stars

== Track listing ==
No.	Title	Writer(s)	Original artist	Length
1.	"Vincent"	Don McLean	Don McLean	3:24
2.	"And I Love You So"	McLean	Don McLean	2:55
3.	"Portrait of My Love"	Norman Newell; Cyril Ornadel	Matt Monro	2:43
4.	"Where Do I Begin?"	Francis Lai; Carl Sigman	Andy Williams	3:36
5.	"These Foolish Things"	Jack Strachey; Eric Maschwitz	Leslie "Hutch" Hutchinson	3:49
6.	"Cry Me a River"	Arthur Hamilton	Julie London	4:03
7.	"Nature Boy"	eden ahbez	Nat King Cole	3:12
8.	"Close to You"	Burt Bacharach; Hal David	The Carpenters	3:04
9.	"You Belong to Me"	Chilton Price; Pee Wee King; Redd Stewart	Jo Stafford	2:49
10.	"Make It Easy on Yourself"	Bacharach; David	Jerry Butler	2:57
11.	"Somewhere"	Leonard Bernstein; Stephen Sondheim	P. J. Proby	2:46
12.	"I Can't Help Falling in Love (with You)"	Hugo Peretti; Luigi Creatore; George David Weiss	Elvis Presley	3:14
13.	"What the World Needs Now"	Bacharach; David	Jackie DeShannon	3:00
Total length:				41:38

Japanese release bonus track
No.	Title	Writer(s)	Original artist	Length
14.	"You're Nobody till Somebody Loves You"	Russ Morgan; Larry Stock; James Cavanaugh	Dean Martin	3:31
Total length:				45:10

== Personnel ==
- Rick Astley – vocals
- Tim Lauer – keyboards, orchestrations
- John Carin – additional acoustic piano (1), guitars (1), stardust (1)
- Dan Petty – acoustic guitars
- Davey Johnstone – electric guitars, slide guitar
- Craig Young – bass
- Shannon Forrest – drums, percussion
- John Altman – soprano saxophone (4, 8)
- Suzie Katayama – orchestra contractor

=== Production ===
- Peter Collins – producer
- Clif Norrell – engineer, mixing (7)
- Andy Brohard – assistant engineer
- Gary Langan – mixing (1–6, 8–13)
- Alexander "Natty" Modiano – mix assistant
- Stylorouge – art direction, design
- Uli Weber – photography

== Charts ==
Chart (2005)	Peak position
UK Albums (OCC)	26
