= Robert Rinder =

British barrister and television personality (born 1978)

Robert Rinder MBE
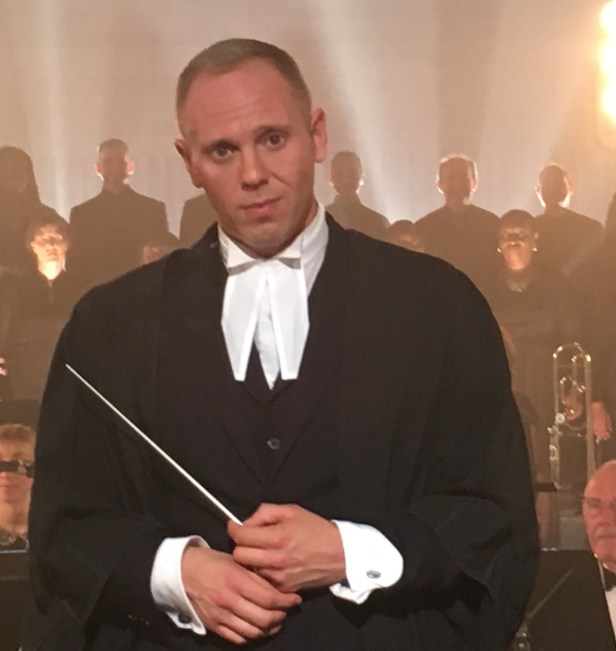
- Rinder conducting a choir in March 2017
- Born: Robert Michael Rinder; 31 May 1978 (age 48); Westminster, London, England
- Other name: Judge Rinder
- Education: University of Manchester
- Occupations: Barrister; television personality; writer
- Years active: 2001–present (barrister); 2014–present (television)
- Television: The Holy Land and Us: Our Untold Stories; Amazing Hotels: Life Beyond the Lobby
- Partner: Seth Cumming (2013–2018)

Robert Michael Rinder (/ˈrɪndər/; born 31 May 1978), sometimes known as Judge Rinder, is a British criminal barrister and television personality. In 2014, while still a practising barrister, he began hosting the reality courtroom series Judge Rinder. In 2019, he also began hosting the Channel 4 series The Rob Rinder Verdict.

In 2022, Rinder also became a regular host on ITV’s Good Morning Britain.

== Early life ==
Rinder was born in London on 31 May 1978 into a Jewish family; his mother is Angela Cohen, chair of the 45 Aid Society. His maternal grandfather, Morris Malenicky, was a Holocaust survivor and one of the "Windermere children".

He was brought up in Southgate and was educated at Osidge Primary School, Queen Elizabeth's School, Barnet and the National Youth Theatre. Rinder later gave up acting because his peer and later close friend, Benedict Cumberbatch, "was so good". Rinder studied politics and modern history at the University of Manchester, graduating with first-class honours.

== Career ==
=== Legal ===
Rinder was called to the bar in 2001, starting his pupillage at 2 Paper Buildings. He then became a tenant at 2 Hare Court. He went on to specialise in cases involving international fraud, money laundering and other forms of financial crime. He was involved in prosecutions following the murders of Leticia Shakespeare and Charlene Ellis in January 2003, who were shot in a drive-by shooting, and the defence of British servicemen on charges of manslaughter after the deaths of detainees in Iraq. Since 2010, he has been involved in the investigation and prosecution of alleged bribery, corruption, and fraud in the British Overseas Territory of the Turks and Caicos Islands in the Caribbean.

=== Television ===
While practising as a barrister, Rinder wrote television scripts in his spare time. Upon attempting to sell one, he met producer Tom McLennan. He approached ITV with a proposal for a remake of the 1970s programme Crown Court, but this was rejected in favour of a British version of Judge Judy, and McLennan offered Rinder the opportunity to front it. From 2014 to 2020, he was the eponymous judge in the reality courtroom series Judge Rinder, where he was referred to as a British Judge Judy.

Shortly after the programme started, he criticised Judith Sheindlin, the judge of Judge Judy, for making judgements based on her preconceptions while claiming that he applied the law seriously and made "real legal rulings". Despite this, he insisted that it be clarified on the programme that he is a practising criminal law barrister and not a civil court judge. As such, he wears his normal barrister's court dress but without the barrister's wig. Rinder received praise for his cross-examination abilities and acerbic comments. His courtroom includes a gavel and flag of the United Kingdom, neither of which is used in British courts but are on display in American courts and televised court programmes, and his show has been criticised as "The Jeremy Kyle Show set in a small-claims court".

In 2015, Rinder released a book called Rinder Rules. In 2016, he presented a new series, Judge Rinder's Crime Stories, with reconstructions of real crimes. He also hosted Raising the Bar on BBC Radio 5 Live, which he started with a discussion with former Lord Chief Justice, Lord Judge. In December 2017 Rinder re-launched Crown Court on ITV, newly named Judge Rinder's Crown Court, with a two-part special after a 30-year hiatus.

In 2016, Rinder competed in the fourteenth series of Strictly Come Dancing, stating that he was doing so to make his grandmother proud of him. Rinder was partnered with Ukrainian-born professional dancer Oksana Platero. Rinder was eliminated in week 11 after scoring 31 points dancing a Samba to "Oh, What a Night". He ended the competition in fifth place.

In an episode of Who Do You Think You Are? broadcast on 13 August 2018, Rinder traced his Jewish family's tragic history and made new discoveries about his grandfather, Morris Malenicky, a survivor of both Schlieben and Theresienstadt concentration camps.

In December 2018, Rinder hosted Good Year Bad Year, a one-off special on Channel 4 where he discussed the topical highs and lows of 2018 along with a number of celebrity guests. In 2019, he began hosting the Channel 4 series The Rob Rinder Verdict.

In July 2020, Rinder appeared on series 2 of Celebrity Gogglebox alongside Susanna Reid.

In November 2020, Rinder released My Family, the Holocaust and Me for BBC One, a documentary which helped Jewish families discover the full truth about what happened to their relatives during the Holocaust. The documentary received widespread acclaim, and was called "a vital history lesson".

Rinder presented on Good Morning Britain on ITV in 2022.

On 14 July 2022, Crime & Investigation UK commissioned the 10-part crime series Rob Rinder's Interrogation Secrets; presented by Rinder, the series premiered on 4 September 2022.

In November 2022, it was announced that Rinder would join chef Monica Galetti as the new co-host of Amazing Hotels: Life Beyond the Lobby.

In March 2023, Rinder co-presented The Holy Land and Us: Our Untold Stories with Sarah Agha for BBC Two, a two-part documentary exploring the personal stories of families of Jewish and Palestinian heritage. In discussing the programme, he commented "I've made clear that I'm a Zionist".

Rinder co-presented with Philippa Langley a November 2023 Channel 4 programme entitled Princes in the Tower: The New Evidence, which discussed her theories about the possible survival of the Princes in the Tower.

In May 2024, BBC Two aired the 3-part series Rob and Rylan's Grand Tour, which has Rinder and Rylan Clark visiting Venice, Florence and Rome, following in the footsteps of Lord Byron and discussing their own broken hearts. Following their BAFTA win for Best Factual Entertainment, Rinder and Clark returned in September 2025 for a second season entitled Rob and Rylan's Passage to India, with the pair exploring the culture and diversity of India in homage to Rinder's favourite author E.M. Forster.

In July 2024, he presented a three-part Channel 4 documentary Britain Behind Bars, about the history of Britain's prison system.

In July 2025, Channel 5 premiered the three-part series Rich Times, Poor Times, hosted by Rinder and Ruth Goodman. The series delves into key historical events through the contrasting lives of the rich and the poor.

In 2025, Rinder played the role of 'The Executor' in the Channel 4 reality show The Inheritance, alongside Elizabeth Hurley.

In November 2026, it was announced that Rinder would appear on the Seventh Taskmaster New Year Treat special, airing in early 2027.

=== Radio ===
Between July and August 2021, Rinder presented a six part series on Classic FM, titled Robert Rinder's Classical Passions. In October 2021, Rinder became the new permanent host of Drivetime every Friday on talkRADIO and talkRADIO TV. Rinder presented the show until September 2022.

In 2022, Rinder travelled to the Polish-Ukraine border to report on the crisis for talkRADIO.

== Writing ==
In 2014, Rinder started to write a legal-based discussion column in the newspaper The Sun, and in 2015, he released a book called Rinder Rules. He became a columnist for the London Evening Standard in 2017.

In 2023, Rinder became a number one Sunday Times bestselling author with the release of his debut novel The Trial. This was followed by The Suspect in 2024, and in June 2025, he published his third book,The Protest, which also made the Sunday Times bestseller list.

== Charitable work ==
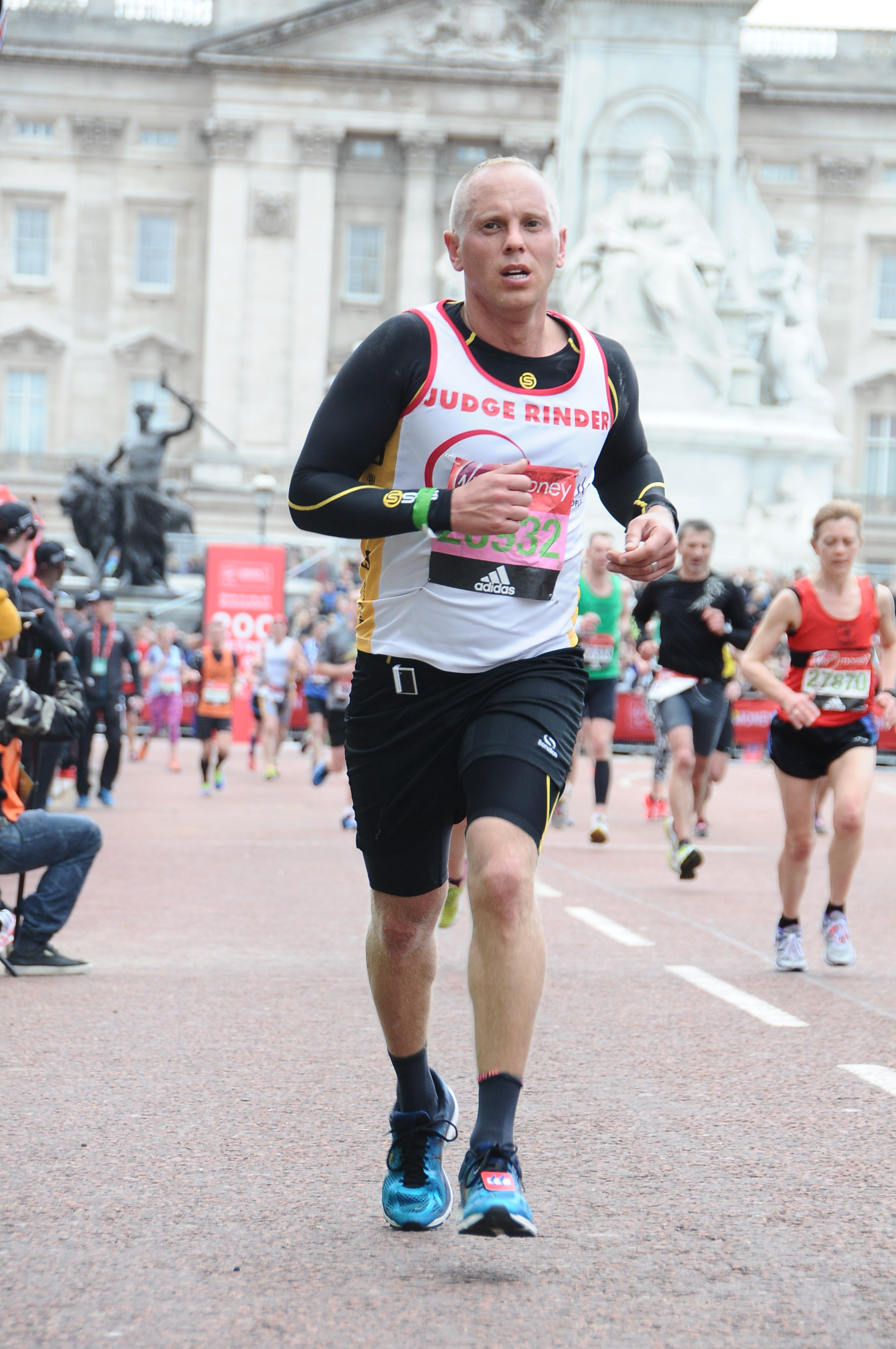
Rinder running the London Marathon in 2016

Rinder is the patron of Buttle UK, a charity for children from impoverished backgrounds; in 2016, he ran the London Marathon to raise money for them, finishing with a time of 03:16:00 (the average for men was 3:48:00). He launched The Italian Job 2018 at The NEC, Birmingham on 10 November 2017.

Rinder is a supporter of and fundraiser for Magen David Adom, an Israeli medical charity. He narrated a documentary on his 36-hour journey with MDAUK's chief executive Daniel Burger in Israel, between 12 and 13 November 2023, entitled Operation Swords of Iron, interviewing emergency personnel about 7 October 2023.

Rinder regularly speaks with pupils at Heathcote Secondary School and Science College and sixth form in Chingford East London on different aspects and careers in law.

== Honours ==
Both Rinder and his mother, Angela Cohen, were appointed Members of the Order of the British Empire (MBE) in the 2021 Birthday Honours for services to Holocaust education and awareness.

He was awarded the honorary degree of Doctor of Laws (LLD) from Southampton Solent University on 3 February 2022. He was awarded the honorary degree of Doctor of Literature (DLitt) from University College London on 20 May 2024.

He was appointed as the Honorary Deputy Colonel Commandant of the Royal Corps of Army Music on 1 January 2024.

== Awards and nominations ==
- 2025 BAFTA Television Award for Best Factual Entertainment – won for Rob and Rylan's Grand Tour

== Personal life ==
Rinder entered into a civil partnership with barrister Seth Cumming at a ceremony on the island of Ibiza in 2013, conducted by Rinder's friend, actor Benedict Cumberbatch. Cumberbatch was legally entitled to conduct the ceremony because of his online Universal Life Church ministerial ordination, and Rinder was later one of three best men at Cumberbatch's wedding to Sophie Hunter in 2015. Rinder and Cumming separated after four years of civil partnership and eleven years together.

In 2023 Rinder was mooted as potential contender to be the Conservative candidate for the 2024 London mayoral election. He ruled himself out of the running in the spring of that year, later saying that he was not a member of any political party.
