= Agnel Lake =

Lake in the Province of Turin, Italy

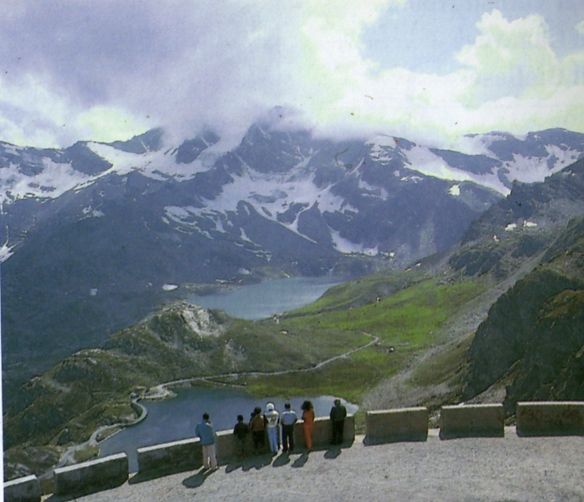
- With Serrù Lake in the foreground as seen from Nivolet Pass

- Location within Italy
- Location: Ceresole Reale, Province of Turin, Piedmont
- Coordinates: 45.4705°N 7.1388°E
- Type: reservoir
- Primary inflows: Orco
- Primary outflows: Orco
- Basin countries: Italy
- Surface elevation: 2,300 m (7,500 ft)

Agnel Lake is a lake at Ceresole Reale in the Province of Turin, Piedmont, Italy, near the Nivolet Pass. The reservoir on the Orco river is located at an elevation of 2,300 m (7,500 ft), close to Serrù Lake. A man-made channel which starts from Agnel connects it to Serrù Lake and Ceresole Lake.
