= Judge Rinder's Crime Stories =

- Genre: Reality
- Presented by: Robert Rinder
- Country of origin: United Kingdom
- Original language: English
- No. of series: 6
- No. of episodes: 60

Production
- Running time: 60 minutes (inc. adverts)
- Production company: ITV Studios

Original release
- Network: ITV
- Release: 20 June 2016 – 8 October 2021

Related
- Judge Rinder

Judge Rinder's Crime Stories is a British reality television show that has aired daily on ITV from 20 June 2016 to 8 October 2021. It is hosted by Robert Rinder.

== Background ==
Most episodes feature two stories, and features reconstructions and interviews with families, witnesses and officers involved in the cases.

== Transmissions ==
Series	Episodes	Originally released	
Series	Episodes	First released	Last released
1	10	20 June 2016	1 July 2016
2	10	5 June 2017	16 June 2017
3	10	14 May 2018	25 May 2018
4	10	7 January 2019	18 January 2019
5	10	16 March 2020	27 March 2020
6	10	27 September 2021	8 October 2021
