= Judge Rinder =

British arbitration-based reality court show

- Genre: Arbitration-based reality court show
- Presented by: Robert Rinder
- Starring: Michelle Hassan
- Voices of: Charles Foster
- Country of origin: United Kingdom
- Original language: English
- No. of series: 7
- No. of episodes: 686

Production
- Production location: Dock10 studios
- Running time: 60 minutes (inc. adverts)
- Production company: ITV Studios

Original release
- Network: ITV
- Release: 11 August 2014 – 14 October 2020

Related
- Judge Rinder's Crime Stories

Judge Rinder is a British arbitration-based reality court show that aired on ITV from 11 August 2014 to 14 October 2020, with repeats continuing until 24 September 2021. The show depicts Robert Rinder as an arbitrator overseeing civil cases. Rinder began his career in criminal law in 2003. He is a barrister and wears his barrister robes while on the show, but does not wear the wig as is customary in the judiciary.

Rinder is a practising criminal barrister at 2 Hare Court Chambers in London and this is made clear on the show. As with other related court shows that inspired it, such as Judge Judy, Judge Mathis and The People's Court, any awards handed down by Rinder are paid by the production company rather than the loser.

== Show structure ==
The hearings are conducted in a studio styled as a television-related courtroom with entertainment styling, including a Union Jack flag and another flag with the show's logo and a gavel, neither of which are used in UK courts. The robes worn by Rinder are regular barristers' robes without the wig and, in England and Wales, most small claim trials are conducted in district judges' chambers. The show follows the same format as other television court shows, such as Judge Judy and Judge Mathis.

The claimant and defendant enter the courtroom separately, while narrator Charles Foster says their first names (unlike Judge Judy, where full names are used) along with details of the case and they take their places at their respective benches: the claimant on the judge's left, and the defendant on the judge's right. Rinder then asks the claimant and defendant to confirm their names, and the case proceeds.

The bailiff on the show is Michelle Hassan, who passes items of evidence (photographs, receipts, copies of text messages etc.) between the litigants and Judge Rinder during proceedings, which can be displayed on a large video screen in the courtroom (with certain identifying information electronically blurred) when required. Hassan also brings a box of tissues or a glass of water to any litigant who should become distressed during their case, as well as escorting any additional witnesses into the courtroom and who give their evidence, standing in a dock on the same side of the room where she stands and out of the courtroom again afterwards.
