= The Italian Job (soundtrack) =

Soundtrack album by Quincy Jones
- Released: 1969
- Recorded: 1969
- Genre: Film score
- Length: 27:32
- Label: Paramount PS 5007
- Producer: Quincy Jones

Quincy Jones chronology
MacKenna's Gold (1969)	The Italian Job (1969)	The Lost Man (1969)

Singles from The Italian Job
- 1. "On Days Like These" Released: 1969

The Italian Job is the soundtrack to the 1969 film which was composed and arranged by Quincy Jones and released on the Paramount label.

The lyrics to "On Days Like These" and "Getta Bloomin' Move On! (The Self Preservation Society)" were written by Don Black. "Getta Bloomin' Move On! (The Self Preservation Society)" was the closing theme of the film and was performed by members of the cast; the lyrics feature Cockney rhyming slang. Many incidental themes are based on English patriotic songs, such as "Rule, Britannia!", "The British Grenadiers" and "God Save the Queen".

== Reception ==
The Vinyl Factory opined, "It may seem like a hodgepodge of quirky film cues, baroque harpsichord bits and lounge (Matt Monro's silky turn on 'On Days Like These'), but this album is really a brilliant mash-up of styles ... There is samba, there is country, there is harpsichord, there are a bunch of blokes shouting in cockney; it's the sounds of the Swinging '60s in a 29-minute nutshell".

== Track listing ==
All music composed by Quincy Jones except otherwise indicated

1. "On Days Like These" (Don Black, Quincy Jones) – 3:40
2. "Something's Cookin'" – 2:30
3. "Hello Mrs. Beckerman!" – 1:02
4. "Britannia and Mr. Bridger – If You Please" – 2:00
5. "Trouble for Charlie" – 1:47
6. "On Days Like These" – 3:09
7. "It's Caper Time (The Self Preservation Society)" – 3:13
8. "Meanwhile, Back In the Mafia" – 1:23
9. "Smell That Gold!" – 1:32
10. "Greensleeves and All That Jazz" (Traditional; arr Jones) – 2:06
11. "On Days Like These" – 1:14
12. "Getta Bloomin' Move On! (The Self Preservation Society)" (Black, Jones) – 3:56

== Personnel ==
- Unidentified orchestra arranged and conducted by Quincy Jones
- Gil Bernal − vocals (track 10)
- Matt Monro – vocals on "On Days Like These"
- Michael Caine et al – vocals on "Getta Bloomin' Move On! (The Self Preservation Society)"
- Peter King – saxophone
- Christopher Whorf – art direction
- Duffy Power – harmonica
