= Matt Monro Jnr =

British singer

Matt Monro Junior
- Born: Matthew Frederick Monro; 21 February 1964 (age 62)
- Occupation: Singer
- Years active: 1977–present
- Labels: EMI, One Media Publishing

Matthew Frederick Monro (born 21 February 1964) is a British singer. The son of Matt Monro, he often performs his father's work.

In 1977, when Monro junior was 13, he was invited by his father to join him on stage to perform a duet.

From 1986 he worked at the Coral Bingo hall in Wealdstone.

When he signed with EMI in 1995, modern technology enabled him to sing with his father again. The album, Matt Sings Monro, is a collection of Matt Monro songs, rearranged as duets featuring Monro junior and senior. It features songs such as If I Never Sing Another Song and On Days Like These.

In 2005, he toured England with a new show, The Legend Lives On which was a year in the making and took him to over 40 concert venues across England. He toured the same show in 2006. In the last few years, he has been working with his late father's musical director, Colin Keyes.
