= Catch a Rising Star (album) =

Studio album by John Gary
- Released: October 1963
- Genre: Traditional pop, vocal
- Length: 33:21
- Label: RCA Victor
- Producer: Hugo & Luigi

John Gary chronology
Catch a Rising Star (1963)	Encore (1964)

Professional ratings
Review scores
Source	Rating
AllMusic	4/5 stars
Billboard	Positive (Spotlight)
Cashbox	Positive (Pop Pick)

Catch a Rising Star is the debut album from singer John Gary, released in 1963 on the RCA Victor label. The album spent over a year on the Billboard and Cashbox album charts.

== Background ==
Although having previous success in the acting industry, this was Gary's first attempt at national stardom. RCA Victor Records put substantial promotional force behind the LP, and it succeeded, launching his recording career. The album was a favorite among critics as well, and at the 6th Annual Grammy Awards it got Gary nominated for Best Vocal Performance, Male. Catch a Rising Star featured several standards such as "Unchained Melody" and "Ebb Tide", country hits like "Your Cheatin' Heart" and "Half as Much", and recent popular titles "My Kind of Girl" and "More". Gary was a former songwriter himself, joining ASCAP in 1960. He is credited with writing the track "Possum Song".

== Reception ==
The album received a positive critical reception upon its release. Billboard praised Gary's covers of "Once Upon a Time," "More," and "Somewhere Along the Way". They wrote, "An apt title here. Gary has an immense talent and excellent musical taste," noting that "Marty Gold's orle provides a lush background to a flock of standards." Cashbox believed that the album "John Gary makes an impressive disk debut on Victor with this album of romantic ballads, up-tempo tunes, and folksongs." They called him a "very versatile singer," noting that "Gary has a three-octave range excitingly showcased here on tunes requiring power, polish and sophistication".

== Chart performance ==
The album debuted on Billboard magazine's Top LP's chart in the issue dated November 8, 1963, peaking at No. 20 during a sixty-eight-week run on the chart. The album debuted on Cashbox magazine's Top 100 Albums chart in the issue dated October 26, 1963, peaking at No. 9 during a forty-eight-week run on the chart. The album didn't receive any singles releases.

== Track listing ==
=== Side one ===
No.	Title	Writer(s)	Length
1.	"This Is All I Ask"	Gordon Jenkins	2:39
2.	"My Kind of Girl"	Leslie Bricusse	2:37
3.	"Once Upon a Time"	Charles Strouse; Lee Adams	2:58
4.	"Till the Birds Sing in the Morning"	Will Holt	2:42
5.	"Your Cheatin' Heart"	Hank Williams	2:44
6.	"Yellow Bird"	Alan Bergman, Marilyn Keith; Norman Luboff	2:46

=== Side two ===
No.	Title	Writer(s)	Length
1.	"Unchained Melody"	Alex North; Hy Zaret	3:28
2.	"Half as Much"	Curley Williams	2:25
3.	"More (Theme from Mondo Cane)"	Riz Ortolani; Nino Oliviero; Norman Newell	3:07
4.	"Possum Song"	John Gary	2:08
5.	"Somewhere Along the Way"	Kurt Adams; Sammy Gallop	3:12
6.	"Ebb Tide"	Carl Sigman; Robert Maxwell	2:35
Total length:			33:21

== Accolades ==
Organization	Year	Category	Result	Ref.
Grammy Awards	1964	Best Vocal Performance, Male	Nominated	

== Charts ==
Chart peaks for Catch a Rising Star
Chart (1963–1964)	Peak position
US Billboard Top LPs	20
US Cashbox Top 100 Albums	9
