= The Italian Job =

1969 British film by Peter Collinson

- Original theatrical release poster
- Directed by: Peter Collinson
- Written by: Troy Kennedy Martin
- Produced by: Michael Deeley
- Starring: Michael Caine; Noël Coward; Benny Hill; Raf Vallone; Tony Beckley; Rossano Brazzi; Maggie Blye
- Cinematography: Douglas Slocombe
- Edited by: John Trumper
- Music by: Quincy Jones
- Production company: Oakhurst Productions
- Distributed by: Paramount Pictures
- Release date: 5 June 1969
- Running time: 99 minutes
- Country: United Kingdom
- Language: English
- Budget: $3 million
- Box office: $9 million

The Italian Job is a 1969 British comedy caper film written by Troy Kennedy Martin, produced by Michael Deeley, directed by Peter Collinson, and starring Michael Caine. The film's plot centres on Cockney criminal Charlie Croker, recently released from prison, who forms a gang for the job of stealing a cache of gold bullion being transported through the city of Turin, Italy, in an armoured security truck.

In addition to Caine, the cast also included Benny Hill, Raf Vallone, Tony Beckley and Noël Coward; the film was Coward's last before his retirement from acting. The soundtrack was composed by Quincy Jones, featuring the songs "On Days Like These", sung by Matt Monro over the opening credits, and "Getta Bloomin' Move On" (usually referred to as "The Self-Preservation Society", after its chorus) during the climactic car chase, which featured Caine among its singers.

The film proved a success upon its release, earning acclaim amongst critics for the performances by Caine and Coward, the film's reflection of British culture from the period, and the climactic car chase. It became a cult symbol of British filmography and was ranked favourably in the top 100 British films by the British Film Institute. Several elements became symbolic cult features, including a rare never-resolved cliffhanger ending, and Caine's famous line "you were only supposed to blow the bloody doors off".

The popularity of The Italian Job led to several parodies and allusions in other films and productions, including the 2005 episode of The Simpsons titled "The Italian Bob", and a re-enactment of the Mini Cooper car-chase in the MacGyver episode "Thief of Budapest". The film itself was later given a video game adaptation in 2001, before receiving a remake in 2003. A charity event titled The Italian Job, founded in 1990 and held annually, was inspired by the film; as of 2020, it had raised nearly £3,000,000. Marking the 50th anniversary of the film in June 2019, stunt drivers in red, white and blue Coopers recreated parts of the film's car-chase around Turin at the grounds of Mini's Oxford factory.

== Plot ==
While driving through the Alps, thief Roger Beckerman is murdered by the local Mafia and his body disposed of in the river below. In the United Kingdom, his friend and fellow thief, Charlie Croker, is released from prison. After reuniting with his girlfriend, Lorna, to celebrate his freedom, Croker goes to meet Beckerman to discuss a heist, but is shocked to find only his widow. She insists that Croker continue with Beckerman's final masterpiece: an ambitious heist of $4 million in gold bullion, (Note: The $4 million in gold bullion in 1969 is equivalent to $35.1 million in 2025.) from a convoy transport in the city of Turin, Italy.

Croker breaks back into prison to request financial backing from British nationalist crime lord Mr. Bridger. Initially unconvinced, Bridger soon offers support after confirming the scheme's potential. With Bridger's right-hand man, Camp Freddie, Croker recruits a crew of specialists, including Lorna, professional drivers, and lecherous computer expert Professor Simon Peach. With preparations complete, Bridger stages a funeral ceremony to meet the team in person. He discloses that the Mafia are expecting them, as they killed Beckerman over his planned heist and see the prospect of foreigners stealing Italian gold as an insult to their pride.

Travelling through the Alps, Croker splits the team up to avoid raising suspicion. However, Croker's group are confronted by Mafia boss Altabani and his men, who destroy their backup escape cars and warn against continuing the plan. Croker and his men narrowly avoid being killed by threatening Bridger's reprisal against Italians living in the United Kingdom. Undeterred, the team continue to Turin. That night, the team infiltrate the Turin traffic control centre and Peach replaces a magnetic-tape data storage reel with a duplicate designed to sabotage the traffic control system.

On the day of the heist, as the gold arrives at Turin airport, Croker sends Lorna to Geneva to keep her safe, promising to meet her there later. Meanwhile, Peach is arrested for molesting a woman on a tram.

The convoy begins its journey through Turin, followed by Altabani. One of Croker's men sabotages the city's CCTV surveillance while the traffic control system malfunctions, disabling traffic lights and causing city-wide traffic jams that eventually force the convoy to stop outside the Museo Egizio. The crew intercept the convoy, subdue its police escort, and tow the armoured van carrying the gold into a building. While police ram the door, the crew breach the van and divide the gold between the boots of three Mini Coopers. The remaining crew escape disguised as British football fans, while Croker leads the Mini Cooper drivers out of the city, evading the police and the Mafia using an ingenious route designed by Beckerman that avoids the stalled traffic by taking them over stairs, pedestrian streets, rooftops, and through sewers.

Mr. Bridger receives word of the successful heist and celebrates with his fellow inmates and prison staff, as the crew escapes Turin and conceals the Minis in the back of a modified coach. Driving through the Alps, they unload the gold and dispose of the Minis before collecting the remaining crew. During a reckless celebration, the coach driver loses control of the vehicle, resulting in the rear of the coach teetering precariously over a cliff. The crew stands at the front of the coach in an attempt to counterbalance the weight of the gold at the rear. Croker slowly crawls towards the gold which slides ever further from him. Finally, he turns to the crew and declares: "Hang on a minute lads. I've got a great idea."

== Cast ==
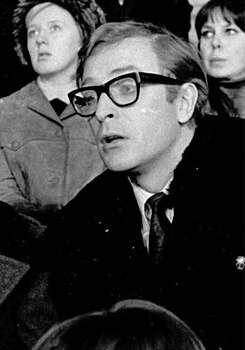
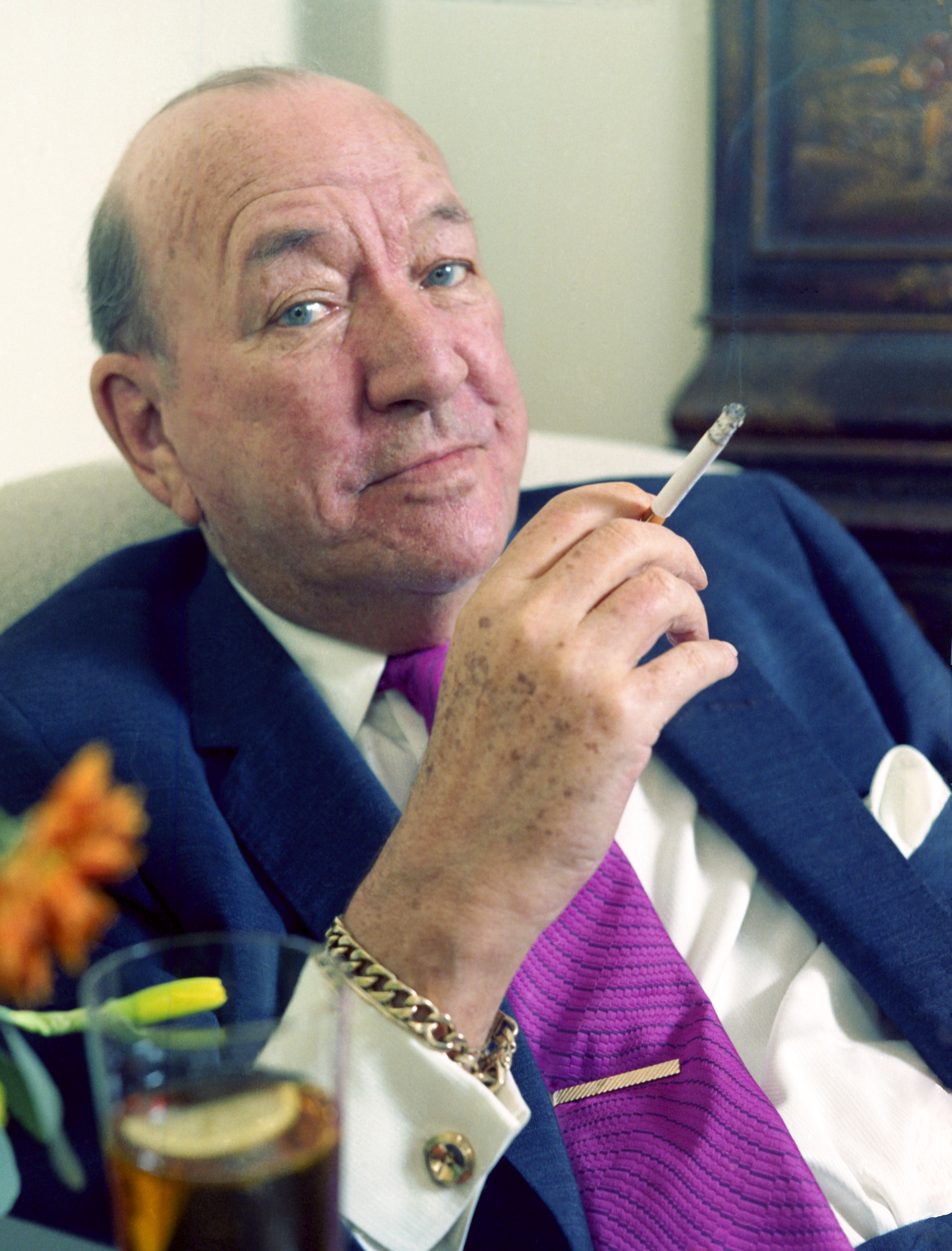
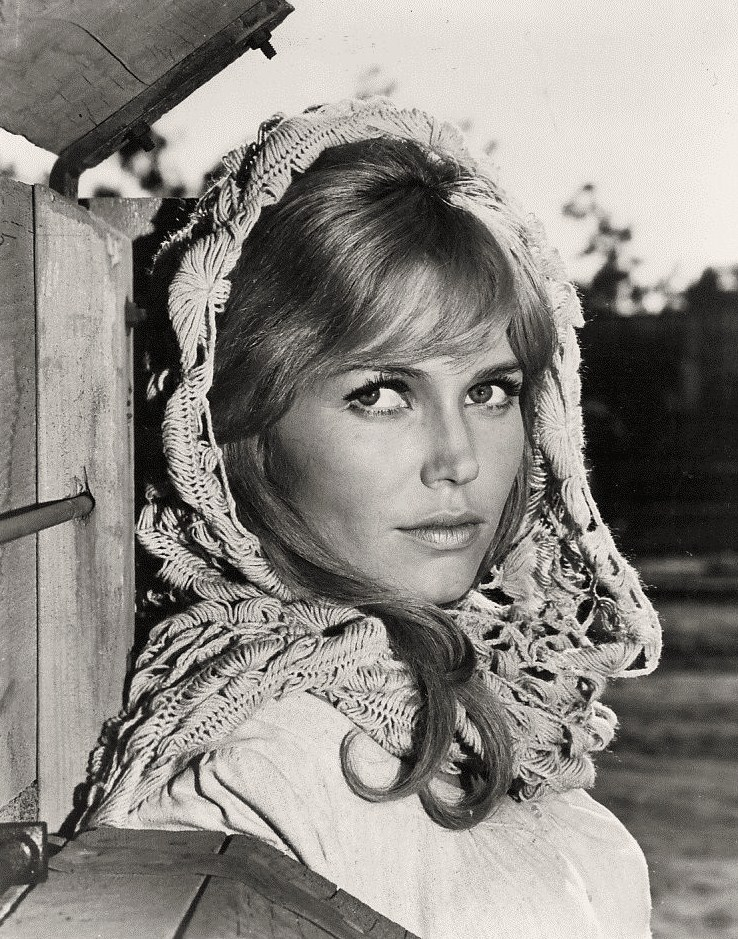
Michael Caine (pictured in 1967), Noël Coward (1972), and Maggie Blye (1967)
- Michael Caine as Charlie Croker, a charismatic and quick-witted professional thief
- Noël Coward as Mr. Bridger, a sophisticated and commanding British crime lord
- Benny Hill as Professor Simon Peach, an eccentric computer expert, needed to help sabotage Turin's traffic control system
- Raf Vallone as Altabani, a shrewd and menacing mafia boss
- Tony Beckley as Camp Freddie, Bridger's flamboyant right-hand man, sent to supervise Charlie's team and help steal the gold
- Rossano Brazzi as Roger Beckerman, the criminal mastermind behind the heist, Charlie's friend
- Maggie Blye as Lorna, Croker's daring and playful girlfriend, who serves as a reserve getaway driver

The Italian Job also features Irene Handl as Miss Peach, Professor Peach's sister; John Le Mesurier as the Prison Governor, who works for Bridger; Fred Emney as Birkinshaw, a gang member who is sent to jam the Turin CCTV; Michael Standing as Arthur, one of Charlie's thieves; John Forgeham as Frank, one of Charlie's thieves; George Innes as Bill Bailey, Charlie's deputy during the heist; Harry Baird as Big William, the imposing coach driver for the heist; Robert Powell as Yellow, one of Charlie's thieves; Derek Ware as Rozzer, one of Charlie's thieves; Frank Jarvis as Roger, one of Charlie's reserve getaway drivers; and Stanley Caine as Coco, one of Charlie's thieves.

Other cast includes John Clive as a garage manager who Charlie sees after being released from prison; Graham Payn as Keats, Bridger's sycophantic right-hand man in prison; Barry Cox as Chris, one of the Mini drivers for the heist; David Salamone as Dominic, one of the Mini drivers for the heist; Richard Essame as Tony, one of the Mini drivers for the heist; Mario Valgoi as Manzo, Renato Romano as Cosca, Franco Norvelli as Altabani's driver, Robert Rietti as the Police chief, Timothy Bateson as the Dentist, David Kelly as the Vicar at the fake funeral; Arnold Diamond as Senior computer room official, Simon Dee as the Shirtmaker who Charlie sees after being released from prison; Alistair Hunter as Warder, Lana Gatto as Mrs. Cosca, Louis Mansi as Computer room official, Henry McGee as the Tailor who Charlie sees after being released from prison; Lelia Goldoni as Mrs Beckerman, Roger Beckerman's widow; and Valerie Leon as Hotel Receptionist.

== Production ==
=== Writing ===
According to producer Michael Deeley the film started "as a modest concept for a TV drama concerning a robbery set in and around a traffic jam in London's hectic Oxford Street thoroughfare", that was originally conceived by Ian Kennedy Martin. Ian's brother Troy would eventually buy the idea from him "with the vision of creating a feature film set in Italy." The script was optioned by Oakhurst Productions, the company of Deeley and Stanley Baker.

=== Ending ===
According to a "Making Of" documentary, producer Deeley was unsatisfied with the four written endings and conceived the current ending as a literal cliffhanger appropriate to an action film which left an opportunity for a sequel. The documentary describes how helicopters would save the bus seen on the cliff at the end of the first film. In interviews in 2003 and 2008, Michael Caine revealed that the ending would have had his character Charlie Croker "crawl up, switch on the engine and stay there for four hours until all the petrol runs out ... The van bounces back up so we can all get out, but then the gold goes over." In Deeley's own memoirs, he stated that a sequel would have had an opening involving helicopters lifting the bus up to separate the men and the gold that then sees it taken by the Mafia, who proceed to push the bus off into the ravine.

In 2008, the Royal Society of Chemistry held a competition for a solution that had a basis in science, was to take not more than 30 minutes and did not use a helicopter. The idea was to promote greater understanding of science, and to highlight the 100th anniversary of the periodic table, on which gold is element number 79. The winning entry, by John Godwin of Surrey, was to break and remove two large side windows just aft of the pivot point and let the glass fall outside to lose its weight; break two windows over the two front axles, keeping the broken glass on board to keep its weight for balance; let a man out on a rope through the front broken windows (not to rest his weight on the ground) who deflates all the bus's front tyres, to reduce the bus's rocking movement about its pivot point; drain the fuel tank, which is aft of the pivot point, which changes the balance enough to let a man get out and gather heavy rocks to load the front of the bus. Unload the bus. Wait until a suitable vehicle passes on the road, hijack it and carry the gold away in it.

=== Locations ===
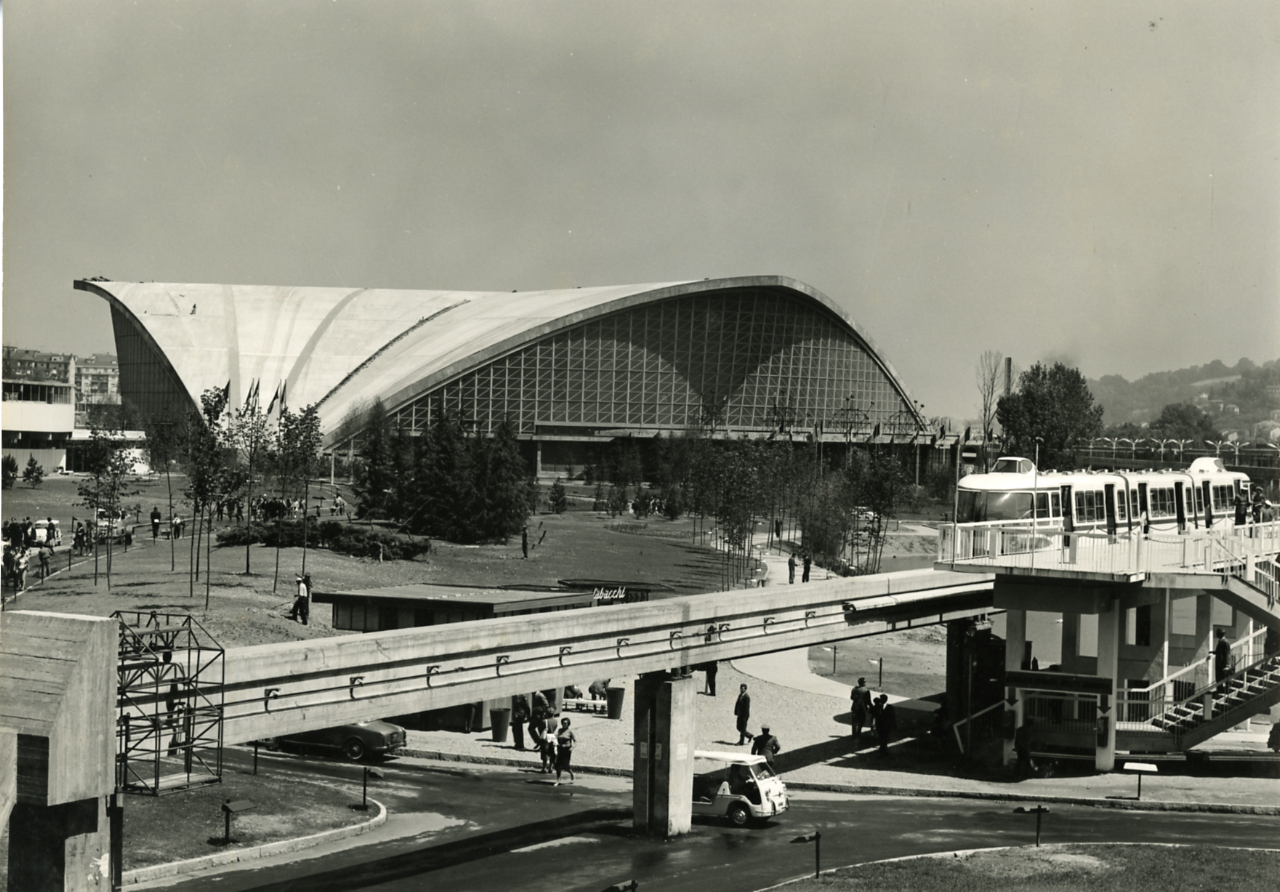
The roof of the Palavela in Turin (pictured in 1961) where the three Minis are pursued by a police car before they go back down it and escape

The opening scenes with the Lamborghini Miura were shot at Great St Bernard Pass, and have been recreated by the owner of the car. The interior of the prison that held Bridger (Noël Coward) was Kilmainham Gaol in Dublin, Ireland. The exterior, seen when Croker leaves, is HM Prison Wormwood Scrubs in West London. Upon his release, Croker stays at the Royal Lancaster Hotel in Bayswater, London, where he celebrates with what is implied to be an orgy; his room became a favourite haunt of rock stars after the release of the film. Denbigh Close, Notting Hill, London W11, was used as the location for Croker's home.

The training sessions shown for the Mini drivers were at the Crystal Palace race track in Upper Norwood, South London. The attempt to blow off the doors of the bullion van, which caused its total destruction and produced Croker's line "You're only supposed to blow the bloody doors off!", took place at Crystal Palace Sports Centre. The Crystal Palace transmitter can be seen in the background. The meeting at the misty funeral was filmed in Cruagh Cemetery, in the foothills of the Dublin Mountains. The office block that doubled as the Turin traffic control centre was Apex House in Hanworth, Middlesex, the then head office of the television rental chain Thorn (DER).

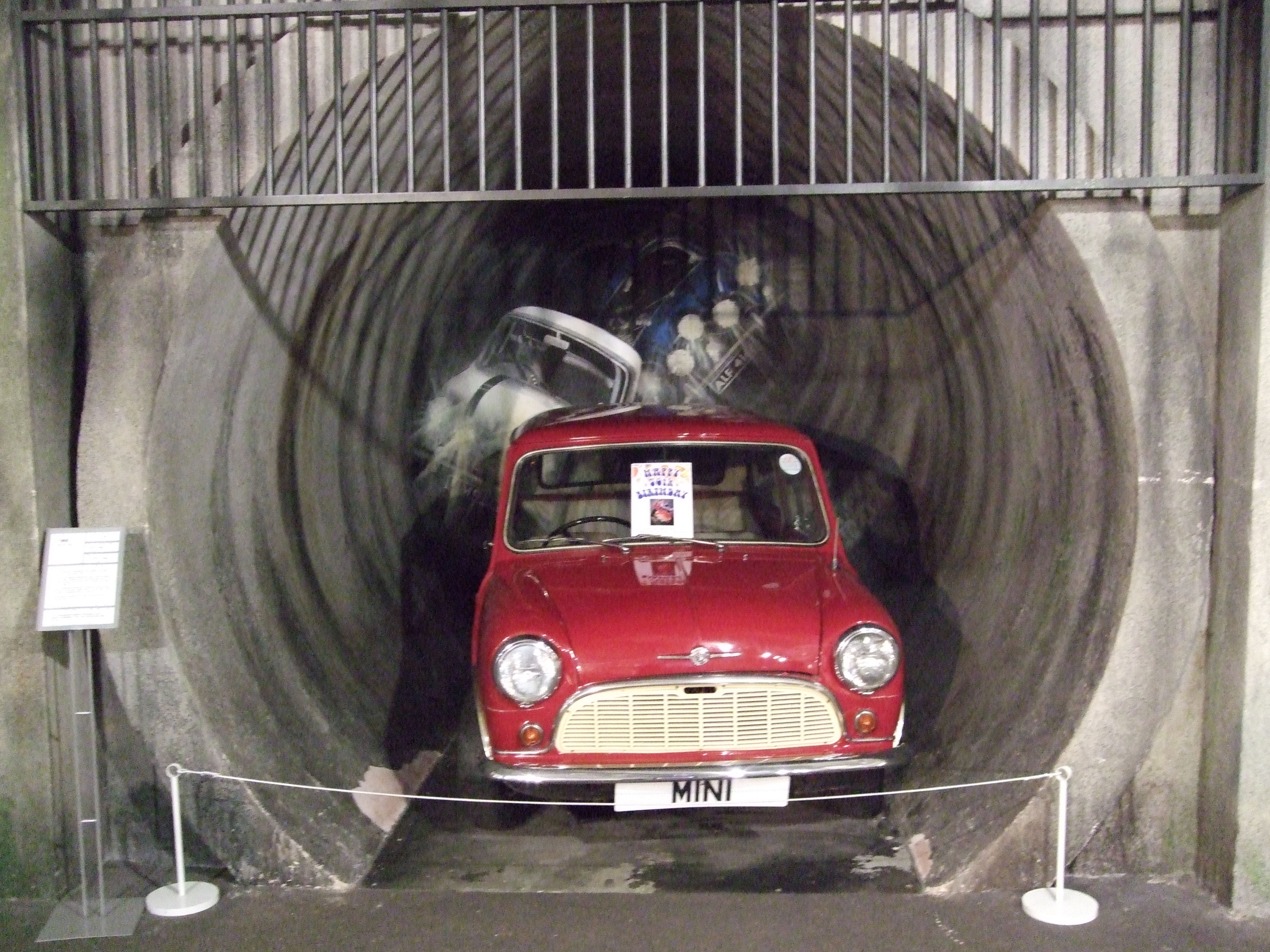
A display of a Mini emerging from a sewer tunnel in Coventry Transport Museum

The chase sequences were filmed in Turin, except for the chase through the sewer tunnel, which was shot in the Sowe Valley Sewer Duplication system in the Stoke Aldermoor district of Coventry in the English Midlands, filmed from the back of a Mini Moke. The person on the far side who closes the gate at the end of the sewer tunnel is the director, Peter Collinson. Collinson also appears in the scene on the highway when the ramps get jettisoned, clinging to the right-hand rear door of the coach as the Minis enter at speed.

A portion of the car chase was filmed as a dance between the Minis and police cars with a full orchestra playing "The Blue Danube" inside Pier Luigi Nervi's Palazzo Esposizioni, usually used for the Turin Motor Show (and now a hospital library). The sequence was deleted from the final cut but is readily available to view.

The final escape from Turin was filmed on the road from Ceresole Reale via Lago Agnel to Nivolet Pass (the highway does not lead to France or Switzerland because it is a dead end).

=== Vehicles ===
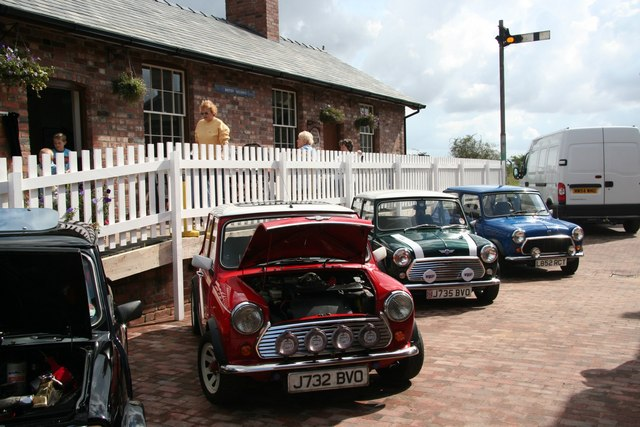
Minis on display at Bardney Heritage Centre

Roger Beckerman (Rossano Brazzi)'s orange Lamborghini Miura in the opening scene is actually two cars. The first was a Miura P400 that was sold as new afterwards. In 2015, it was located and authenticated by classic car expert Iain Tyrrell. The second car, tumbled down the chasm by the Mafia bulldozer, was another Miura that had previously been in a serious accident and was not roadworthy. Lamborghini confirmed in May 2019 that the Italian Job Miura (the roadworthy one) had chassis number 3586.

The Minis featured in the climactic chase were 1275cc Austin Mini Cooper S models. Production took place just as the manufacturer, the British Motor Corporation, was preparing for the introduction of the Mk2 Mini, which was launched just before the film's public release. The Minis used were 1967 Mk1 models, fitted with future-dated 1969 G-suffix number plates to match the year of the film's intended release, despite that any 1969-registered Mini would be a Mk2, not a Mk1. BMC provided six new Minis (two of each colour) to the production at cost price. A further 25 were bought on the second-hand market via BMC's agent in Switzerland. Ten of these second-hand cars were Cooper S models and the remainder were standard 848cc models which were modified to various degrees to match the genuine 'star cars' as required for filming. All 16 Mini Coopers were destroyed or rendered unroadworthy in the course of filming, along with nine of the replica cars, leaving six 848cc replicas surviving intact. These were abandoned in the film crew's storage unit in Turin when filming concluded and their subsequent history is unknown.

Gold cost $38.69 per troy ounce in 1968, so four million dollars in gold bars would have weighed about 3,200 kg (7,100 lb), requiring each of the three Minis to carry about 1,070 kg (2,360 lb) in addition to the driver and passenger. Since a 1968 Mini only weighs 630 kg (1,390 lb), each of these vehicles would have had to carry 1 1/2 times its own weight in gold.

The original Aston Martin DB4 belongs today to a private English collection. According to several sources, the "Aston" pushed off the cliff was a Vignale Lancia Flaminia mocked up as an Aston. The two Jaguar E-Types that suffer from the Mafia's revenge were restored to original condition.

A Land Rover Series IIa Estate, registration BKO 686C, is used to get to the convoy before attacking and is modified with window bars and a towbar. A Ford Thames 400E is used for the football fans' decorated van; this has been referred to as the Dormobile, the name of a common camper-van conversion coachbuilder. The cross-Channel ferry featured in one scene is the MS Free Enterprise I. The ship spent many years as a day cruise ship in Greek waters before being scrapped in 2013. The "Chinese" plane delivering the gold to Turin is a rare Douglas C-74 Globemaster, of which only 14 were built and only four passed into private ownership. It had been abandoned in Milan by its owners and was moved to Turin for filming. It was destroyed by fire in 1970.

The black Fiat Dino coupé of Mafia boss Altabani (Raf Vallone) was bought by Peter Collinson but became so rusty that only its doors remain. The bus used to transport the three Mini Coopers is a Bedford VAL with Harrington Legionnaire bodywork, registration ALR 453B, new in April 1964 and specially converted for the film.

== Music ==
The music for the soundtrack was written by Quincy Jones. The opening theme, "On Days Like These", had lyrics by Don Black and was sung by Matt Monro. The closing theme, "Get a Bloomin' Move On" (a.k.a. "The Self Preservation Society"), was performed by the cast and had lyrics featuring Cockney Rhyming Slang. Many incidental themes are based on British patriotic songs, such as "Rule, Britannia!", "The British Grenadiers" and "God Save the Queen".

== Release ==
The film opened at the Plaza Cinema in London on 5 June 1969.

== Reception ==
Poster for the American release. The film's lack of success in this market was blamed partly on its perceived unattractive and misleading promotion

On review aggregator Rotten Tomatoes, the film holds an approval rating of 82% and an average rating of 7.5/10, based on 33 reviews. The website's critical consensus reads, "The Italian Job is a wildly fun romp that epitomizes the height of Britannia style." On Metacritic it has a score of 70% based on reviews from 10 critics, indicating "generally favorable" reviews. Most positive reviews focus on the climactic car chase and the acting of both Michael Caine and Noël Coward, complementing Peter Collinson's directing. It is considered highly evocative of 1960s London and the era in Britain as a whole. In a modern review Nik Higgins of Future Movies claims that the film makes Austin Powers's wardrobe appear "drab and grey". He compliments Michael Caine's ability to effectively portray the character of Croker.

In 1999, it was ranked No. 36 on the BFI Top 100 British films by the British Film Institute. In November 2004, Total Film named The Italian Job the 27th greatest British film of all time. In 2011, it was voted the best British film in a poll of film fans conducted by Sky Movies HD. The line "You're only supposed to blow the bloody doors off!" by Caine was voted favourite film one-liner in a 2003 poll of 1,000 film fans. One of the most discussed end scenes in film, what happened to the coachload of gold teetering over the edge of a cliff, has been debated in the decades since the film was released.

Vincent Canby, writing at the time of the film's release, felt that the caper film had been made before and much better as well. He complimented the film's technological sophistication, only criticising what he saw as an "emotionally retarded" plot. Canby also expressed concern that Coward's appearance in the film, although intended to be kind, "exploits him in vaguely unpleasant ways" by surrounding his character with images of the royal family, which had not knighted him at the time. A contemporary review in Time magazine felt that the film spent too much time focusing on the film's caper as opposed to building the characters; it also criticised the car chases as "dull and deafening".

The movie was the 14th most popular at the UK box office in 1969. Although it received a nomination for the Golden Globe Award for Best English-Language Foreign Film at the 27th Golden Globes, the film was not a success in the US. The film remains popular, however. James Travers of Films de France believes that the film's enduring appeal rests in the "improbable union" of Michael Caine, Noël Coward and Benny Hill, whom he considers "three of the best known [British] performers [...] in the late 1960s". He states that the film has a cult status and stands as a "classic of its genre".

== Legacy ==
Since 2000, there have been two remakes of the film. The first was released in 2003 and also called The Italian Job, set in Los Angeles and starring Mark Wahlberg as Charlie Croker. It features Donald Sutherland as John Bridger, played as more of a father figure to Croker. It employs the updated Mini Cooper for a chase towards the end. An official Bollywood remake of the 2003 film, called Players, was released in 2012.

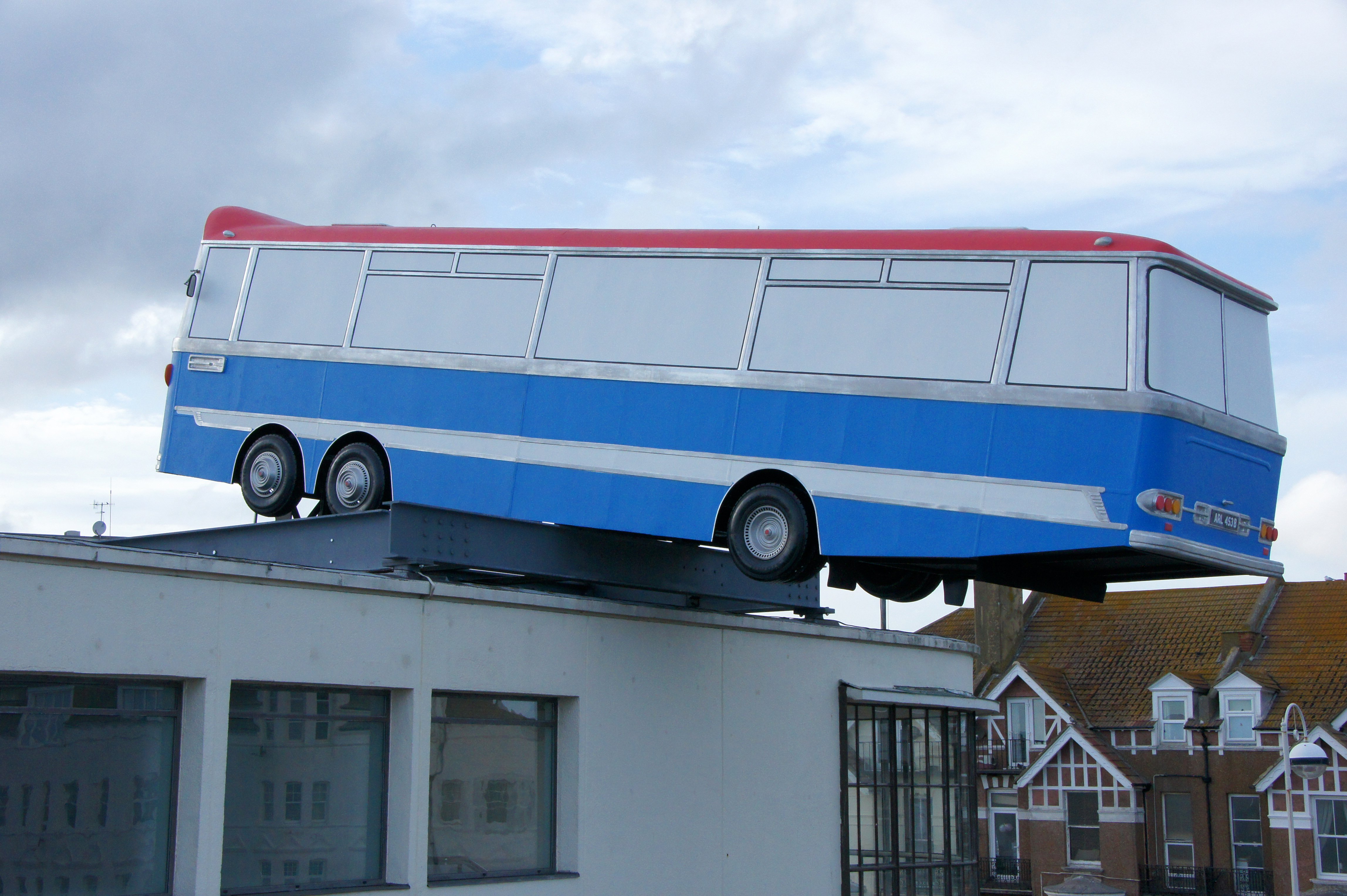
The artwork Hang On a Minute Lads, I've Got a Great Idea by Richard Wilson on the De La Warr Pavilion in Bexhill-on-Sea, East Sussex, England.

The film was adapted into a video game released for the PlayStation in 2001 and Microsoft Windows in 2002 and published by Rockstar Games. The film was also the subject of a play, Bill Shakespeare's "The Italian Job", written by Malachi Bogdanov, who used lines from William Shakespeare plays to tell the story. It was performed in 2003 at the Edinburgh Fringe Festival.

As part of a celebration of British culture at 2012 Summer Olympics, which were held in London, a replica of the bus was made and was exhibited balanced on the edge of the roof of The De La Warr Pavilion in Bexhill-on-Sea. The dialogue and van blowing up scene were shown at the closing ceremony.

In September 2016, NBC and Paramount Television began work on a TV series inspired by the original and the remake, though this never surpassed the development stage. In 2001, author Matthew Field released a book The Making of The Italian Job, and to celebrate 50 years since the film's release he has published a new and updated version, The Self Preservation Society.

In February 2021, it was announced that a sequel TV series would be released on Paramount+. It is set to revolve around Croker's grandchildren, who inherit his old safety deposit box, and a quest to find the Italian bullion is reignited. Matt Wheeler will write and executive produce the series, while Donald De Line will produce, after previously doing so for the 2003 remake.

=== Historic computer security significance ===
The film depicts an early example of an attack against a computer system, or "hacking", as a major part of a plot. Key elements of the attack include the insertion of malicious software onto magnetic-tape data storage. A physical security breach allows the tape to be inserted into the computer which controls the traffic system (SCADA) for Turin; at the same time several cameras are deactivated during the course of the film by devices which cause interference. The result is a focused denial-of-service attack which allows the characters to escape with the stolen gold.
