= Portrait of My Love =

1960 song by Matt Monro

Single by Matt Monro

from the album My Kind of Girl
- B-side: "You're the Top of My Hit Parade"
- Released: 1960
- Genre: Traditional pop
- Label: Parlophone
- Songwriters: Norman Newell (as David West) & Cyril Ornadel

Matt Monro singles chronology
"I'll Know Her" (1960)	"Portrait of My Love" (1960)	"My Kind of Girl" (1961)

"Portrait of My Love" is a song written by Norman Newell and Cyril Ornadel, which was released by Matt Monro in 1960, and was an international hit for Steve Lawrence in 1961.

== Matt Monro version ==
In 1960, Matt Monro released the song as a single. The song was Monro's first hit single, and spent 16 weeks on the UK's Record Retailer chart, reaching No. 3, also reaching No. 3 on the UK's New Musical Express chart. In 1961, the song was released on Monro's album My Kind of Girl.

=== Charts ===
Chart (1961)	Peak position
New Zealand (lever hit parade)	5
UK Record Retailer	3
UK New Musical Express	3

== Steve Lawrence version ==
"Portrait of My Love"

Single by Steve Lawrence

from the album Portrait Of My Love
- B-side: "Oh How You Lied"
- Released: 1961
- Genre: Traditional pop
- Length: 2:51
- Label: United Artists
- Songwriters: Norman Newell (as David West) & Cyril Ornadel
- Producer: Don Costa

Steve Lawrence singles chronology
"Hansel and Gretel" (1960)	"Portrait of My Love" (1961)	"My Clair de Lune" (1961)

In 1961, Steve Lawrence released a version of the song as a single and on the album Portrait of My Love. Lawrence's version became an international hit and spent 16 weeks on the Billboard Hot 100 chart, peaking at No. 9, while reaching No. 1 in the Philippines, No. 7 in Australia, and No. 9 on Canada's CHUM Hit Parade.

Lawrence's version was ranked No. 30 on Billboard's end of year "Hot 100 for 1961 – Top Sides of the Year" and No. 81 on Cash Box's "Top 100 Chart Hits of 1961".

In 1962, Steve Lawrence was nominated for a Grammy Award for Best Male Pop Vocal Performance for his rendition of "Portrait of My Love".

== Awards ==
In 1961, the song won songwriters Norman Newell and Cyril Ornadel the Songwriters' Guild of Great Britain's Ivor Novello Award for "Outstanding Song of 1960".

In 1999, the song was honored at the BMI Awards in London for having two million radio plays.

== Other versions ==
- In 1965, the song became the theme of a Filipino film by the same title, released by Sampaguita Pictures and starring Eddie Gutierrez and Susan Roces.
- In 1967, the Tokens released a cover version of the song as a single. Their version spent eight weeks on the Billboard Hot 100, reaching No. 36, while reaching No. 25 on the Cash Box Top 100, No. 34 on Record World's "100 Top Pops", and No. 23 on Canada's RPM 100.
- In 2005, Rick Astley released a cover of the song for his sixth studio album, Portrait.
