= My Kind of Girl (Matt Monro song) =

Single by Matt Monro

from the album My Kind of Girl
- B-side: "This Time"
- Released: 1961
- Recorded: 1961
- Genre: Traditional pop
- Length: 2:48
- Label: Parlophone
- Songwriter: Leslie Bricusse

Matt Monro singles chronology
"Portrait of My Love" (1960)	"My Kind of Girl" (1961)	"Why Not Now" (1961)

"My Kind of Girl" is a 1961 song originally released by Matt Monro. Monro's version reached number 5 on the UK's Record Retailer chart, while a version by Frank Sinatra and Count Basie reached number 35 the following year.

== Original version ==
"My Kind of Girl" was first released by Matt Monro, and was written by Leslie Bricusse. In February 1961, the British music magazine NME reported that Monro had won ITV's A Song for Britain with "My Kind of Girl"; however, according to his daughter Michele's autobiography Matt Monro: The Singer's Singer, Monro came second in this, although the song would later win an Ivor Novello award for "The Most Performed Work of the Year". Shortly after the result was announced, Monro, George Martin and Johnnie Spence sped into the studio to record the song but had to record the song's B-side, "This Time", beforehand since Spence had left it until late to hand Vic Fraser the score for the record and the copyist had not finished copying the parts for the orchestra.

The song spent 14 weeks on the Billboard Hot 100, reaching No. 18, making Monro the first British artist to reach the US top 20 since Laurie London did so with "He's Got the Whole World (In His Hands)" in 1958. The song also spent 12 weeks on the UK's Record Retailer chart, reaching No. 5 and becoming Monro's second entry on that chart, while reaching No. 6 on Billboard's Easy Listening chart. The song was ranked No. 84 on Billboard's end of year "Hot 100 for 1961 - Top Sides of the Year".

Steve Lawrence, who took Monro's first entry on to the American charts, nearly recorded this record as the follow-up but decided not to use a second one of Monro's records. Both records were awarded a gold disc. "My Kind of Girl" also lent its name to an album of the same name, also released in 1961.

== Cover versions ==
Frank Sinatra covered the song for his 1962 album Sinatra–Basie: An Historic Musical First. This version was released as a single, and spent six weeks on the UK's Record Retailer chart, reaching No. 35. To commemorate what would have been Sinatra's hundredth birthday, The Official Charts Company compiled a list of the top forty highest selling records by Sinatra; "My Kind of Girl" came in at number 38.

Sammy Davis Jr. released a version of the song on his 1964 album Sammy Davis Jr. Salutes the Stars of the London Palladium. Nat King Cole, Perry Como, Tom Jones, John Gary and Guy Mitchell also recorded the song.

Michael Bublé sang a cover as background music to the advert for his fragrance, "By Invitation". Bublé's version appeared on his 2016 album Nobody but Me.
