= The Italian Job (charity event) =

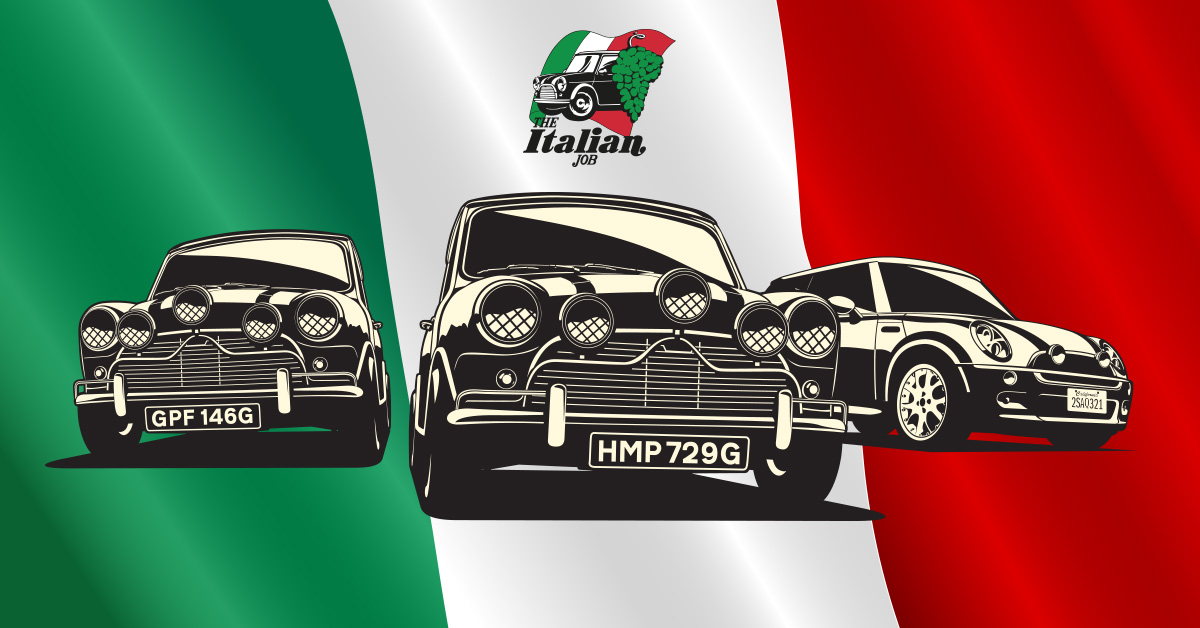
The Italian Job welcomes all Minis/MINIs.

The Italian Job is an annual fundraising event created by the mother-and-son pair Giulia and Freddie St George, and inspired by the original 1969 film The Italian Job, starring Michael Caine and Noël Coward. The run takes place during late October and early November, and involves Minis and other cars driving from the UK to northern Italy and back.

A wide variety of Minis have participated in this modern-day self-preservation society, ranging from models built as early as 1959, the first year of production of the Mini, to brand new BMW MINIs, via derivatives such as the Innocenti, Mini Moke, Mini Marcos, Domino and many more. Other vehicles that were featured in the original film, or their modern derivatives, are also eligible to participate.

The event was started in 1990. Freddie St George's idea was to drive to Trento, Italy, to bring back the Novello, the first Italian wine of the season, within 48 hours.

John Cooper was an early supporter of The Italian Job and introduced Freddie to Denis Chick, then Marketing Director of Rover Group, who was equally enthusiastic. Both Cooper and Chick were frequent attendees at early Italian Job events, and at the Gala Dinners.

The Italian Job developed to encompass exclusive visits to Italian Grand Prix circuits, has toured numerous Italian cities and other historic sites, and often includes the key locations in Turin that were featured in the original film. The event, whose slogan is "Raising money for children in a fun way", since 2018 has raised over £2,700,000 for a variety of children's charities in the UK and other countries and is still organised by its founders, Giulia and Freddie St George.

== Charities supported ==
The initial charities supported were Childline and BBC Children in Need. By 1992, the main beneficiary charity had switched to the NSPCC, who were supported for a total of 8 years. In 2000, The Italian Job organisers moved their support to what was then known as NCH Action for Children. From 2008 to 2011 the event supported Kids Out, a Bedfordshire based national grant giving children's charity, before moving its support again in 2012 to Variety, the Children's Charity and remained with Variety until 2017. In 2018 the Italian Job moved their support to Buttle UK raising over £92,000 for their Chances For Children Grant.

== Regularity drive winners ==
Year	Winning team	Car	Runners up	Car	3rd place	Car
1992	Michael Wildman & Vanessa Gray					
1993	Phil Sullivan & Andy Willets		John Thew & Graham Marwood	1989 Racing Green	Michael Wildman & Vanessa Gray	
1994						
1995						
1996						
1997						
1998						
1999	David Spurdle Steve Griffin	Team 58. 1964 Austin cooper 's' (Howard Special)				
2000						
2001						
2002						
2003						
2004						
2005						
2006						
2007						
2008						
2009	Ken Turner & Jan Reed		Roger & Yvonne Hunt		Carl Belinger & Rachel Cope	
2010						
2011	Jonathan & Emily Blaxill		Jiri & Tereza Plevka		Bill & Linda Handley	
2012						
2013	Duncan Cook & Steve Taylor		Ian & Mary Sims		Roger & Yvonne Hunt	RSP
2014	Alex & Suzy Kinsman		Martin & Sue Lawton		Neil & Family Gray	
2015	Annie White & Will Tyler	2000 Cooper Sport	Brian & Bryn Smith		Bill & Linda Handley	
2016	Vic & Darren Mandrell		Emily Bacon & Jack Mansfield		Jason Harris & Emma Ladbroke	
2017	Harry Weaver & Liam Fearn		Michael Butcher & Martin Wallis		Jon & Bev Raisbeck	
2018	Jon Spriggs & Gary Steggall	1998 Rover Mini Cooper Sports LE	Brian Humphreys & Ian Greaves		Edmond Peel & Sara MacDonald	
2019	Richard & Charlie Henthorn		Tanya & Jason Field		Ruth & Dave Webb	

== Event history ==
=== 1990 ===
The first run was billed as "24 hours from Trento to Brighton!" Fifty six teams responded to an advert that asked, "Would you like to drive to northern Italy in aid of BBC Children in Need and Childline appeals?" and included a team from Auto Express and the winner of the Oldest Mini – a totally restored 1960 Mini van – which suffered a few problems when the carburettor froze on the Alpine roads. The Minis were joined by a Lamborghini Miura P400 restored by the owners as a replica of the one featured in the Michael Caine film. The teams met in Trento, visited locations such as Castel Toblino, collected the Novello and dashed back to Blighty via an overnight stop in Lausanne, Switzerland and the Sealink ferry from Dieppe to Newhaven. The teams congregated at Brighton Marina to celebrate their return and a total of £58.000 was donated to Children in Need and Childline. The event was captured on a 50-minute video "The Great Italian Caper" produced by Frontrunner Video.

== Celebrity supporters ==
=== Patrons ===
Sir Michael Caine

John Cooper

Sir Harry Secombe

Robert Powell

=== Entrants ===
Robert “Judge” Rinder launched The Italian Job 2018 at The Classic Motor Show at The NEC, Birmingham on 10 November 2018. He then took part in the 2018 event, alongside his school friend Rachel Stevens.

David Salamone, who played Dominic in the film, took part in 2019 with co-driver Matthew Field, author of The Self Preservation Society - 50 Years of The Italian Job. David and Matthew drove the 10 Millionth Mini to leave the production line.

== Notable vehicles ==
Since 1990 the event has welcomed nearly all of the other classics featured in the 1969 Michael Caine movie, with the exception of a Daimler Majestic Major (the Pakistani Ambassador's Car), the Coach and the Gold Bullion Van. The red E-Type Jaguar 848 CRY, that featured in the original film, took part in 1992.
