= John Gary =

American singer and performer

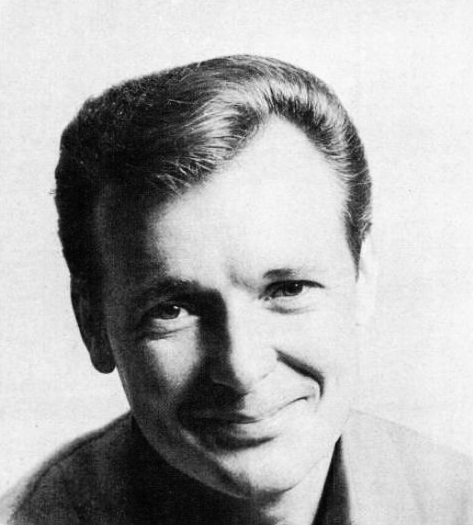
- John Gary in 1966

Background information
- Born: John Gary Strader; November 29, 1932; Watertown, New York, U.S.
- Died: January 4, 1998 (aged 65) Dallas, Texas, U.S.
- Genres: Traditional pop, easy listening
- Occupations: Singer, television personality
- Labels: Fraternity, RCA Victor, USA Kama Sutra

John Gary (born John Gary Strader; November 29, 1932 – January 4, 1998) was an American singer, recording artist, television host, and performer on the musical stage.

== Early life ==
From Watertown, New York, Gary started singing at the age of 5. He joined his older sister, Shirley Strader. At the age of 9, he won a 3-year scholarship to the prestigious Cathedral School of St John in Manhattan. He auditioned for the choir master, Norman Coke-Jeffcott. At the age of 10, Gary had won two pins of distinction from the American Theatre Wing Merchant Seaman's Club for the Stage Door Canteen. Aged 12, he toured the southern states with Frank Pursley, a blind pianist for the Mason Conservatory.

== Career ==
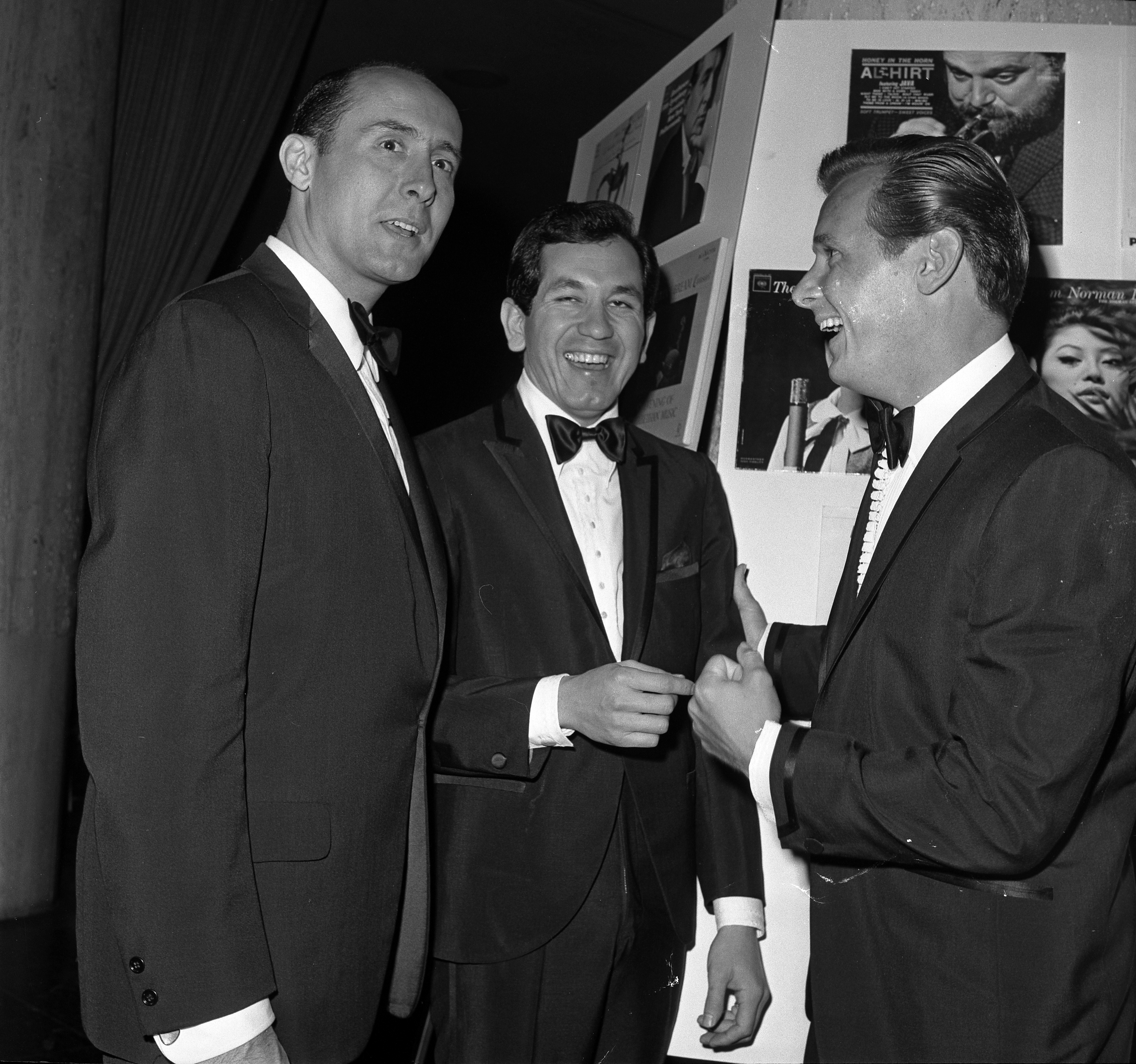
Henry Mancini, Trini Lopez, and John Gary at the 1964 Academy Awards, where Gary's debut album was nominated

Gary sang in movies, on Broadway, had his own prime time network television variety series and appeared at Carnegie Hall, with numerous orchestras. He appeared thirty times as a guest on The Tonight Show with Jack Paar, Steve Allen and Johnny Carson. He traveled across the US and Canada with approximately 40 concerts per year. For six years, he gave community concerts in over 400 cities and towns. He recorded 24 albums for RCA Victor.

Prior to national stardom, Gary appeared on local New Orleans television station WDSU-TV, as a regular feature on the noontime television show Midday. He also appeared at the Blue Room of the Roosevelt (later Fairmont) Hotel. He performed The John Gary Show, three fifteen-minute shows a week, presaging his national (CBS) show a decade later, a summer replacement for the Danny Kaye Show.

Gary was considered by many to be one of the most talented of popular singers due to his breath control and the tonal quality of his voice. He had an exceptionally wide range of 3 1/2 octaves. His singing ranged from robust baritone to a high sweet tenor often in the same song, and he was noted for his versatility. Many popular songs of the time were suited to his intimate style.

Gary first recorded on Fraternity Records between 1958 and 1960. In 1960, he joined ASCAP and composed several popular songs. After signing with RCA Victor, Gary was nominated for a 1964 Grammy Award for Best New Artist, and his 1963 LP Catch a Rising Star was nominated for Best Vocal Performance, Male. He was a favorite singer of fellow RCA Victor artist Elvis Presley. He had five songs that made the adult contemporary (or easy listening) chart in Billboard magazine. The song "Cold", released in 1967, was his most successful, topping the chart for two weeks at the end of that year. However, the song failed to crack the Billboard Hot 100 pop chart. In 1968 he voiced John Alden in the Rankin/Bass Animated TV special The Mouse on the Mayflower.

RCA has reissued some of his recordings and a 92-track, four-CD box set on the Collectables label.

He served honorably in the United States Marine Corps for three years.

John Gary died in 1998 at age 65 of cancer in Dallas, Texas.

== Discography ==
The list below shows the singer's studio albums and live albums only. His full discography, singles, and other releases are described in a separate article. Gary is noted for charting a total of thirteen albums as well.

- John Gary (1961)
- Catch a Rising Star (1963)
- Encore (1964)
- So Tenderly (1964)
- The John Gary Christmas Album (1964)
- David Merrick Presents Hits from His Hits (with Ann-Margret) (1964)
- A Little Bit of Heaven (1965)
- The Nearness of You (1965)
- Your All-Time Favorite Songs (1965)
- Choice (1966)
- Your All-Time Country Favorites (1966)
- A Heart Filled with Song (1966)
- The One and Only John Gary (1966)
- Especially for You (1967)
- Carnegie Hall Concert (1967)
- Spanish Moonlight (1967)
- On Broadway (1968)
- That Warm and Tender Glow (1968)
- John Gary Sings / John Gary Swings (1968)
- Holding Your Mind (1968)
- Love of a Gentle Woman (1969)
- That's the Way It Was (1969)
- Constantly (1975)
- In a Class by Himself (1977)
- On Tour (1984)

== See also ==
- List of artists who reached number one on the U.S. Adult Contemporary chart
