= The Italian Job (2001 video game) =

- Developer: Pixelogic
- Publishers: PlayStation: PAL: Sales Curve Interactive; NA: Rockstar Games; Windows: PAL: SCi Games; NA: Global Star Software
- Director: Bryan Reynolds
- Producer: Peter Hickman
- Designer: Kris Gormley
- Programmer: Chris Butler
- Artist: Richard Richter
- Composer: Allister Brimble
- Engine: RenderWare (PC)
- Platforms: PlayStation, Windows
- Release: PlayStation: EU: 5 October 2001; NA: 3 May 2002; AU: 19 September 2003; Windows: EU: 12 April 2002; AU: 19 April 2002; NA: 14 August 2002
- Genre: Racing
- Modes: Single-player, multiplayer

The Italian Job is a racing video game based on the 1969 film of the same name, developed by Pixelogic and first published for PlayStation to European markets by SCi and Sold Out in 2001, and to North American markets by Rockstar Games in 2002. A port of the game for Microsoft Windows was released in Europe by the then-rebranded SCi Games, and in North America by Global Star Software in 2002.

The game features a story mode based on the film, and a multiplayer "party" mode where players compete through several different circuits in London and Turin, as well as a single-player practice mode where the player can develop skills needed for completing the story mode. The game features representations of London and Turin that the player can drive around freely within a sandbox mode, in a range of cars including the Mini.

== Production ==
The game was developed in conjunction with Pixelogic's Continuous Ordered Scenery Streaming (COSS) technology. This allowed designers to plan and design the "vast environments" required for effectively recreating complex scenes from the film, notably "The Escape Route". The city layouts were modelled using 3DS Max. Phil Cornwell impersonated the voice of Michael Caine as the main character, Charlie Croker.

== Reception ==
Reception

Aggregate score
Aggregator	Score
Metacritic	(PC) 59/100 (PS) 73/100

The Italian Job received "mixed or average" reviews, according to review aggregator Metacritic.
