= On Days Like These =

Single by Matt Monro

from the album The Italian Job soundtrack
- Released: 1969
- Recorded: 1969
- Genre: Traditional pop
- Length: 3:41
- Label: Capitol Records
- Songwriters: Quincy Jones; Don Black
- Producer: George Martin

"On Days Like These" is a pop ballad by English singer Matt Monro. It was composed by Quincy Jones, written by Don Black, and produced by George Martin. It was first released on Quincy Jones' soundtrack album The Italian Job by Paramount Records, as it was written for the 1969 film of the same name, where it is played in the opening credits, uninterrupted by background soundscape.

To introduce and conclude the song, Monro speaks the words "Questi giorni quando vieni, il bel sole" which translates to "These days when you come, the beautiful sun" setting a poetic, nostalgic, melodic tone and reflective atmosphere.

== Certifications ==
Region	Certification	Certified units/sales
United Kingdom (BPI)	Silver	200,000^{‡}
^{‡} Sales+streaming figures based on certification alone.
