= Serrù Lake =

Lake in Piedmont, Italy

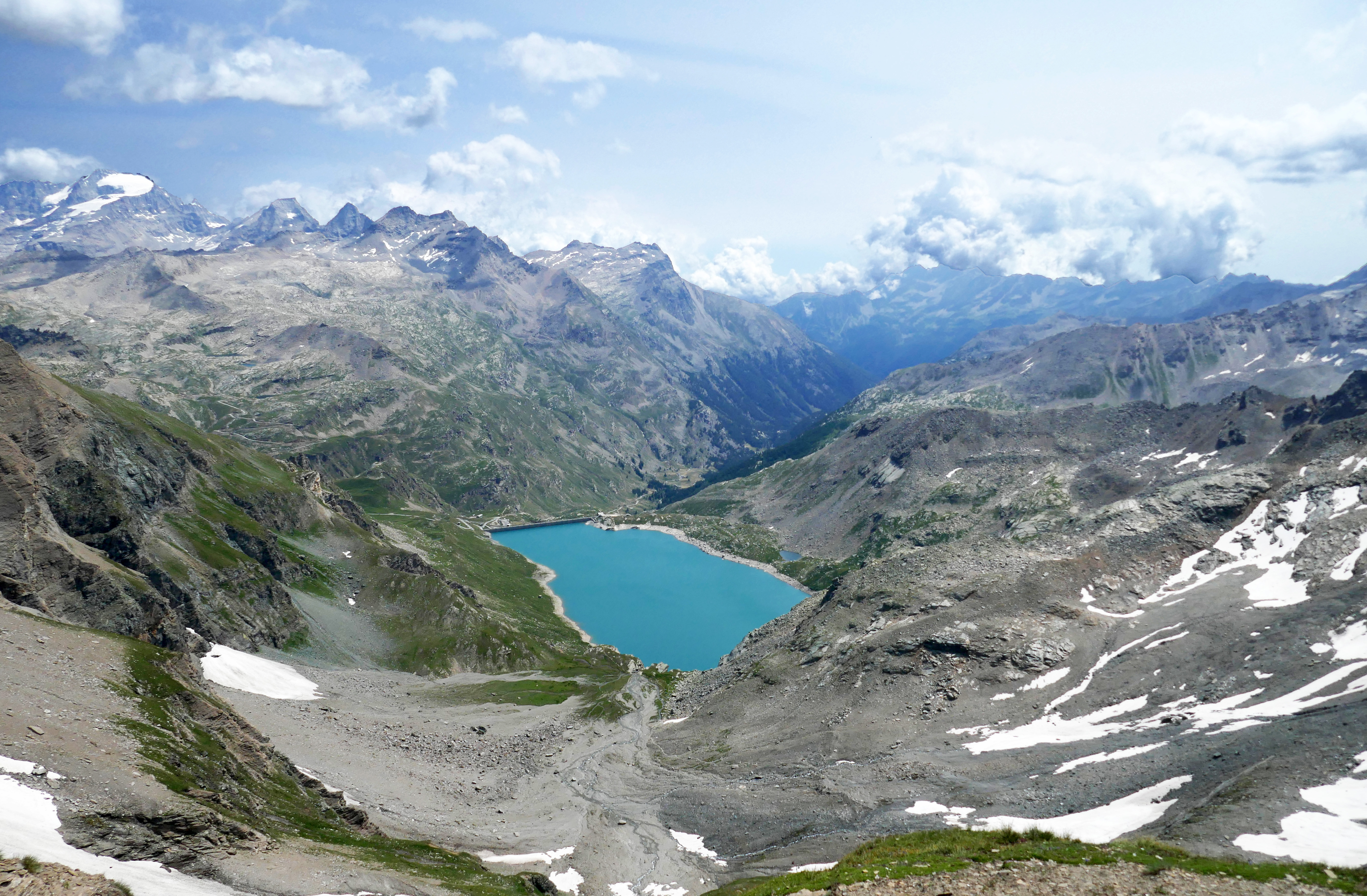

- Location within Piedmont
- Location: Province of Turin, Piedmont
- Coordinates: 45°27′33″N 7°07′33″E
- Primary inflows: Orco
- Primary outflows: Orco
- Basin countries: Italy
- Surface elevation: 2,275 m (7,464 ft)

Serrù Lake is an artificial lake in the Province of Turin, Piedmont, Italy. Specifically, the lake is situated in the Orco Valley, within the municipality of Ceresole Reale, and lies along the road that leads up to the Colle del Nivolet.

The lake's elevation is 2,275 meters above sea level. Its primary function is to serve as one of the artificial basins (along with others like Agnel and Ceresole) that feed various hydroelectric power plants in the valley.

The entire area surrounding the lake is situated within the protected territory of the Gran Paradiso National Park. Additionally, it is a significant starting point for excursions and alpine ascents to high peaks, including the Cima del Carro and the Grande Aiguille Rousse.
