= Matt Monro =

British singer (1930–1985)

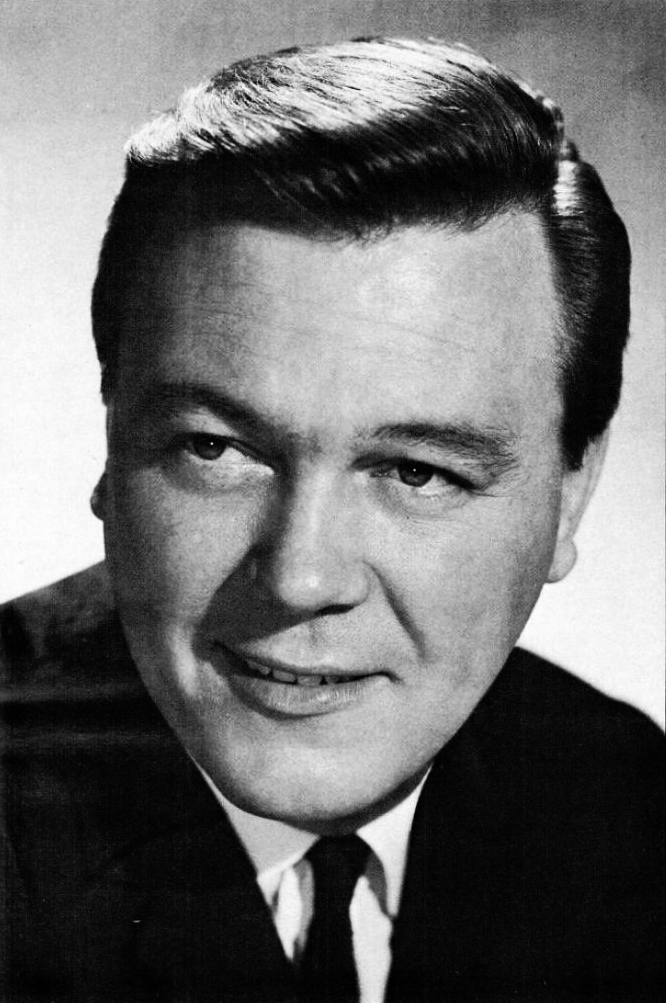
- Monro in 1965

Background information
- Born: Terence Edward Parsons; 1 December 1930; Finsbury, London, England
- Died: 7 February 1985 (aged 54) Kensington, London, England
- Genres: Easy listening; pop
- Occupation: Singer
- Years active: 1956–1985
- Labels: Decca; Ember; Parlophone; Capitol; Columbia
- Website: Official website

Matt Monro (born Terence Edward Parsons; 1 December 1930 – 7 February 1985) was an English singer. Known as "The Man with the Golden Voice" and the "British Sinatra," he performed internationally during his 30-year career and sold a reported 23 million records. AllMusic has described Monro as "one of the most underrated pop vocalists of the '60s", who "possessed the easiest, most perfect baritone in the business". Frank Sinatra said of Monro after his death: "If I had to choose three of the finest male vocalists in the singing business, Matt would be one of them. His pitch was right on the nose; his word enunciations letter perfect; his understanding of a song thorough."

Monro's recordings include the UK top 10 hits "Portrait of My Love", "My Kind of Girl", "Softly As I Leave You", "Walk Away", and a cover of the Beatles' "Yesterday". He also recorded several film themes such as the title track for the James Bond film From Russia with Love, "Born Free" for the film Born Free, and "On Days Like These" for The Italian Job.

== Life and early career ==
Monro was born Terence Edward Parsons on 1 December 1930 in Finsbury, northeast of the City of London, to Frederick and Alice Parsons. He had three brothers — Arthur, Reg and Harry — and a sister, Alice. He attended Duncombe School in Islington and Elliott School, Putney.

Monro had a difficult childhood. His father died when he was three, and after his mother became ill, he was fostered out for two years. Leaving school at 14, he tried a succession of jobs without remaining in any of them for very long, before National Service beckoned in 1948. Monro became a tank driving instructor in the British armed forces and was posted to Hong Kong. He had sung in public from an early age, for example at the Tufnell Park Palais, and in Hong Kong he took to entering local talent contests, winning several. In fact, he became a regular guest (and frequent winner) of Radio Rediffusion's Talent Time show in Hong Kong. He was invited by then-host Ray Cordeiro to perform in his own one-off show entitled Terry Parsons Sings, on the condition that he would bow out of future Talent Time episodes to make way for others. Agreeing to the deal, he performed his first on-air concert for Rediffusion on 27 June 1953.

Following his discharge from the Army after five years, he returned to London, to try to make a career out of singing. Initially he had little success and was obliged to take on a number of different jobs to supplement his meagre income from the occasional singing engagement. He also hung around the music publishers offices in Denmark Street and occasionally made demos of new songs for their ever-optimistic song-pluggers. Eventually, he became a bus driver for London Transport, driving Route 27 from Holloway (Garage code J) Bus Garage (now demolished: the present Holloway Garage [HT] is the former Holloway Trolleybus Depot).

In 1956, he made a demo record, "Polka Dots and Moonbeams" which was heard by pianist Winifred Atwell, who was an important influence on his early career. She recommended him to her own recording company, Decca Records, who signed him. She became his mentor, providing him with his stage name, Matt Monro. Matt came from Matt White, a journalist friend; and Monro was Atwell's father's Christian name. His first record which was released in November 1956, was "Ev'rybody Falls in Love with Someone", a song which had just won the BBC Festival of Popular Songs. Monro gained some radio exposure on Radio Luxembourg and, starting on 2 January 1957, became a featured vocalist with the BBC TV Show Band Parade show presented by Cyril Stapleton which ran until 28 June 1957. He also got a television spot on The Winifred Atwell Show in 1956.

In 1957, Monro released Blue and Sentimental, an album of standards. Despite the album's favourable reception, Monro languished among the young male singers trying to break through at the end of the 1950s, many of them emulating Frankie Vaughan by recording cover versions of American hits. Monro even recorded a version of Vaughan's "Garden of Eden" during this period. A short recording contract with Fontana Records followed.

By the end of the 1950s, Monro's mid-decade profile had declined, and he returned to relative obscurity. He and his wife, Mickie, lived from her wages as a song plugger and his royalties from a TV advertising jingle for Camay soap. In 1959, he recorded a country pastiche song, "Bound for Texas", for The Chaplin Revue, a feature-length compilation of Charlie Chaplin shorts. It would be the first of many Monro soundtrack themes.

== International career ==
Prior to producing the Peter Sellers album Songs for Swingin' Sellers in 1959, EMI producer George Martin asked Monro to record "You Keep Me Swingin'", a satirical song to help the comedian imitate the song with a Frank Sinatra-type styling. When Sellers heard the recording he decided to use it as the opening track on the record, rather than record his own version, which he realised he couldn't improve on himself. However, Sellers billed Monro as "Fred Flange", and though it was a demoralising experience at the time, the incident developed into a lifelong friendship with Martin, who subsequently asked Monro to begin recording with him for EMI's Parlophone record label. Their second single and Monro's highest UK chart success, "Portrait of My Love", written by Cyril Ornadel and Norman Newell (using the pseudonym "David West") and arranged/conducted by Johnnie Spence, reached number three on the UK Singles Chart.

By the following year, Monro had been named Top International Act by Billboard. In February 1961, the British music magazine NME reported that Monro had won ITV's A Song for Britain with "My Kind of Girl". His follow-up hits included that song, plus "Softly as I Leave You" (1962) and the title song from the James Bond film From Russia with Love (1963). For the latter, his vocals were not used in the opening titles, as became the standard for the series; they were heard on a radio during the film and over the final credits.

At the 1964 Eurovision Song Contest, singing "I Love the Little Things", Monro finished second behind Italy's 16-year-old Gigliola Cinquetti, his rendition being described an "excellent performance of the only English language song of the night". The Austrian entry "Warum nur warum?", performed by songwriter Udo Jürgens, caught Monro's ear, despite its sixth-place finish, and he recorded an English version titled "Walk Away", earning him another hit single in late 1964. The song had lyrics by Monro's manager and friend, Don Black, whom he had met during his Denmark Street days when Black was working for Toff Music. He also had a hit with the Beatles' "Yesterday" in 1965, the first cover version of the most recorded song, even pre-dating the Beatles' own release. That year, he was voted top singer in England in a poll.

The following year, Monro sang the Oscar-winning title song for the film Born Free, which became his signature tune. It was also his second collaboration with John Barry, following "From Russia with Love". Monro went on to record two further songs from Barry film scores: "Wednesday's Child" (from the film The Quiller Memorandum) and "This Way Mary" (from Mary, Queen of Scots). Both "Born Free" and "On Days Like These" (from the film The Italian Job) had lyrics by Don Black.

In the late 1960s, he recorded another Udo Jürgens song with the name "Was Ich Dir Sagen Will". It was adapted to English as "The Music Played". Monro recorded a Spanish version of the song with the adapted title of "Alguien Cantó". The Spanish version was a top sales hit (Superventas) in Spain in 1969. Additionally, Monro recorded an English version of Jürgens' 1966 Eurovision winner "Merci, Chérie", but it failed to chart when released as a UK single.

Monro reached the United States charts when "My Kind of Girl" (1961) and "Walk Away" (1964) hit the top 40. In 1966, following the death of Nat King Cole, EMI moved Monro from Parlophone to Capitol. The new recording contract necessitated a move to the United States. This would be the beginning of a trend towards LPs, and he now worked with American arrangers such as Sid Feller and Billy May on recording albums which included "This Is the Life", "The Late Late Show", "Invitation to the Movies" and "Invitation to Broadway". However, unlike "Born Free", his other Capitol singles in California were not particularly successful.

After moving to California and recording several albums with American arrangers, Monro returned to the UK and stayed with George Martin. He later began to change labels within EMI to Columbia, where his final U.S. album Close to You was released in 1970. This LP contained "We're Gonna Change the World", a semi-satirical song originally used in a TV commercial for Kellogg's Cornflakes. It was not a hit in either the US or the UK but was nevertheless widely played, and became enduringly popular on BBC Radio 2. A re-recording in 1995, in which Monro's son duetted electronically with his late father, did however just scrape into the UK chart at No. 100.

On 31 December 1976, Monro performed Black's "Walk Away" on BBC1's A Jubilee of Music, celebrating British pop music for Queen Elizabeth II's impending Silver Jubilee.

Monro continued touring and recording until just before his death, releasing a single and promoting it throughout the UK and Australia in 1984.

== Personal life ==
Monro was married twice: to Iris Jordan, married 15 January 1955–1959 (divorced). They had one son, Mitchell Terence Parsons (1955 – 2003); then to Renata "Mickie" Schuller (19 July 1933, Berlin – 25 February 2010, Middx, UK), married 1959–1985 (his death). Schuller was a Kindertransport child refugee who came to London in 1938. They had a daughter, Michele (1959), and a son, Matt Monro Jnr (born Matthew Frederick Monro) (1964). She had an earlier marriage: (Giles – Schuller, Ealing, 1954).

== Death ==
Monro was a heavy smoker and battled alcoholism from the 1960s until 1980. He was diagnosed with liver cancer and was due to have a liver transplant around Christmas 1984 but it was deemed that the cancer had spread too far. He died on 7 February 1985 at Cromwell Hospital, Kensington, London, aged 54, leaving a widow, Mickie, and three children: Mitchell, Michele, and Matthew.

Monro was cremated at Golders Green Crematorium. The ashes were removed by the family. A memorial service was also held in Harrow.

== Legacy ==
The 20th anniversary of Monro's death spotlighted the continuing interest in his music, with a top 10 tribute compilation CD (UK), a No. 1 concert DVD (UK), and a BBC TV documentary all appearing in 2005. A 2007 compilation CD entitled From Matt with Love reached the top 40 of the UK Albums Chart during its first week of release. His songs were featured on Friday Night Is Music Night on 8 October 2010.

In late 2005, Matt Monro Jr. toured the United Kingdom with a tribute concert commemorating the anniversary. Also, EMI re-released Matt Sings Monro, a 1995 duet album that combined his voice with the senior Monro's. Another posthumous Matt Monro duet, with Cliff Richard, appeared on Richard's duets CD, Two's Company, in 2007.

Monro's version of "Softly as I Leave You" was used in a Coronation Street episode in 2010, focusing around the death of Jack Duckworth.

Monro never recorded a "live" concert album, preferring the technical purity of the recording studio and wanting his public performances to retain an element of uniqueness. However, in the past few years, commercially released concert albums have emerged following remastering of radio and television shows, private recordings he commissioned. These include a 1967 cabaret performance from his first tour of Australia; a 1967 BBC concert with Nelson Riddle; a 1966 arena concert before 24,000 people in Manila; and one of his final concerts, recorded on the last night of his fifteenth and final Australian tour in 1984.

His daughter Michele has written a biography in 2010, The Singer's Singer: The Life and Music of Matt Monro, and has been instrumental, along with sound engineer Richard Moore, in releasing rare and unreleased material by Matt Monro.

Through the years, Monro's recordings have been featured in radio and television commercials. In July 2020, the Unilever brand Axe began airing an American TV campaign for its deodorant line that spoofed the restrictions on dating during the COVID-19 pandemic, with Monro's "Born Free" as the soundtrack theme.

In March 2020, Monro reached No. 8 on the UK Albums Chart with an album of performances with a quintet recorded in New York. These recordings, later overdubbed by Dave Cavenaugh in Hollywood, were released for the first time as Monro wanted them to be.

In December 2020, on what would have been Monro's 90th birthday, his family created an official YouTube page with a four-part audio documentary, The Boy from Shoreditch.

== Bibliography ==
- Monro, Michelle (2010). The Life And Music of Matt Monro: Singer's Singer. Titan Books. ISBN 978-1848-566-187.

Awards and achievements
Preceded by Ronnie Carroll with "Say Wonderful Things"	United Kingdom in the Eurovision Song Contest; 1964	Succeeded by Kathy Kirby with "I Belong"
