= The Definitive Collection (A Life in Music) =

Compilation album by Cilla Black
- Released: 3 August 2009
- Recorded: 1963–2003
- Genre: Pop
- Label: EMI
- Producer: George Martin; David Mackay; Ted Carfrae

Cilla Black chronology
Cilla in the 70s (2003)	The Definitive Collection (A Life in Music) (2009)	Completely Cilla: 1963-1973 (2012)

The Definitive Collection (A Life in Music) is a compilation album by Cilla Black, released in 2009 to celebrate her 45-year career in show business.

== Overview ==
Released as a three disc set – two CDs and one DVD, the album includes all of Black's biggest hit singles as well as new remixes, previously unreleased tracks and Black's first ever music DVD of rare live performances acquired from the BBC archives. The first 20 tracks on disc one also appeared on The Very Best of Cilla Black in 1983 and 2013.

== Track listing ==
=== Disc one ===
1. "Love of the Loved"
2. "Anyone Who Had a Heart"
3. "You're My World"
4. "It's for You"
5. "You've Lost That Lovin' Feelin'"
6. "I've Been Wrong Before"
7. "Love's Just a Broken Heart"
8. "Alfie"
9. "Don't Answer Me"
10. "A Fool Am I"
11. "What Good Am I?"
12. "I Only Live to Love You"
13. "Step Inside Love"
14. "Where Is Tomorrow?"
15. "Liverpool Lullaby"
16. "Surround Yourself with Sorrow"
17. "Conversations"
18. "If I Thought You'd Ever Change Your Mind"
19. "Something Tells Me (Something's Gonna Happen Tonight)"
20. "Baby We Can't Go Wrong"
21. "Never Run Out (Of You)"
22. "He Was a Writer"
23. "Little Bit of Understanding"
24. "(I Wanted to Call It) Off"
25. "Something Tells Me (Something's Gonna Happen Tonight)" (Almighty Radio Edit)

=== Disc two ===
1. "Goin' Out of My Head"
2. "Sing a Rainbow"
3. "For No One"
4. "Work Is a Four-Letter Word" (Film Version)
5. "Only Forever Will Do"
6. "Aquarius"
7. "Words"
8. "On a Street Called Hope"
9. "For Once in My Life"
10. "The April Fools"
11. "Oh Pleasure Man"
12. "Your Song"
13. "Junk"
14. "(They Long to Be) Close to You"
15. "Our Brand New World"
16. "The World I Wish for You" [Without Fade]
17. "I Hate Sunday"
18. "I Don't Know How to Love Him" [Take 2]
19. "Oh My Love"
20. "The Air That I Breathe"
21. "Lay It All Down"
22. "Brooklyn"
23. "Black Paper Roses" (2009 Chicken Feed Remix)
24. "Kiss You All Over" (2009 Acoustic Mix)
25. "Beautiful Goodbye" (2009 Klubkidz Remix)

=== Disc three (DVD) ===
1. "You're My World" (The Royal Variety Performance)
2. "Don't Answer Me" (The Ken Dodd Show)
3. "Step Inside Love" (Cilla Show)
4. "Love's Just a Broken Heart" (Cilla Show)
5. "Where Is Tomorrow" (Top of the Pops)
6. "Liverpool Lullaby" (Cilla Show)
7. "The Look of Love"/"Walk On By" (Cilla Show)
8. "Surround Yourself with Sorrow" (Top of the Pops)
9. "Yesterday" (Cilla Show/Live In Berlin)
10. "Goin' Out of My Head" (Cilla Show/Live In Berlin)
11. "You've Lost That Lovin' Feelin'" (Cilla Show)
12. "I Am Woman" (Cilla Show)
13. "You're So Vain" (Cilla Show)
14. "Help Me Make It Through the Night" (Cilla Show)
15. "Day by Day" (Cilla Show)
16. "Alfie" (Cilla Show)
17. "Baby We Can't Go Wrong" (Cilla Show)
18. "When Will I See You Again" (Cilla Show)
19. "50 Ways to Leave Your Lover" (Cilla Show)
20. "If I Thought You'd Ever Change Your Mind" (Cilla Show)
21. "Imagine" (Cilla Show)
22. "Something Tells Me" (Cilla Show)
23. "Conversations" (Cilla Show)
24. "Sing a Rainbow" (Cilla Show)
25. "You're My World" (Cilla Show/Live at the Royal Albert Hall)
26. "Beautiful Goodbye" (Promo)

== Credits ==
Personnel

- Lead Vocals by Cilla Black
