= The Wonderful World of Andy Williams =

Studio album by Andy Williams
- Released: 1964
- Recorded: January 13, 1963; November 1, 7, 27, 1963; December 3, 1963
- Genres: Traditional pop; vocal pop; early pop/rock
- Length: 33:31
- Label: Columbia
- Producer: Robert Mersey

Andy Williams chronology
The Andy Williams Christmas Album (1963)	The Wonderful World of Andy Williams (1964)	The Academy Award–Winning "Call Me Irresponsible" and Other Hit Songs from the Movies (1964)

Singles from The Wonderful World of Andy Williams
- 1. "A Fool Never Learns" Released: December 24, 1963

The Wonderful World of Andy Williams is the thirteenth studio album by American pop singer Andy Williams and was released by Columbia Records to coincide with the December 31, 1963, broadcast of The Andy Williams Show. Various tracks were recorded with members of his family, including The Williams Brothers, who joined him for a remake of his first top 10 hit, "Canadian Sunset", from 1956.

The album made its first appearance on Billboard magazine's Top LPs chart in the issue dated January 25, 1964 and remained there for 24 weeks, peaking at number nine. it also debuted on the Cashbox albums chart in the issue dated January 25, 1964, and remained on the chart for 37 weeks, peaking at number eight. It received Gold certification from the Recording Industry Association of America on August 17, 1964.

The single from the album, "A Fool Never Learns," made its debut on the Billboard Hot 100 chart on January 11, 1964, eventually reaching number 13 during its 10-week stay. It performed even better on the Easy Listening chart, peaking at number four. number 13 on the Cashbox singles chart during its 12-weeks stay. and number 40 in The U.K during its four-weeks stay.

The album was released on compact disc as one of two albums on one CD by Collectables Records on January 22, 2002, along Williams's 1962 Columbia album, Danny Boy and Other Songs I Love to Sing. It was included in a box set entitled Classic Album Collection, Vol. 2, which contains 15 of his studio albums and two compilations, released on November 29, 2002.

== Reception ==
Professional ratings
Review scores
Source	Rating
Allmusic	3/5 stars
Record Mirror	3/5 stars
The Encyclopedia of Popular Music	3/5 stars
Disc	3/5 stars

William Ruhlmann of AllMusic said that the album "consisted of familiar ballads, dating back to the 1940s for Johnny Mercer's "Dream" (another choral performance not unlike the Pied Pipers' hit version) and coming up to the present for Williams versions of hits like Tony Bennett's "This Is All I Ask" and Jack Jones' "Wives and Lovers." "Softly, As I Leave You" was a good piece of material"

Cashbox noted "the songster gives top-notch readings of such lyrical goodies as "Canadian Sunset," "Wives And Lovers" and "Pennies From Heaven", calling the album "First-rate listening enjoyment"

Variety reported that the album showed "Andy Williams still leads the way through soloing neatly on "This Is All I Ask" and "A Fool Never Learns".

American Record Guide referred to it as a "most pleasurable album"

Record Mirror calls the Williams' family collaboration "smooth adult music with style, and loads of entertainment value."

Nigel Hunter of Disc notes "Andy is featured on solocut on items like 'This is All I Ask', and 'September Song', wIth his wife on 'Let It Be Me'."

The critics of Record Mirror, Disc, AllMusic, and The Encyclopedia of Popular Music each gave the album a three-star ratings, the latter's rating meaning that they believed that album was "Good by the artist's usual standrands, ane therefore recommended."

== Track listing ==
=== Side one ===
1. "Canadian Sunset" performed with The Williams Brothers (Norman Gimbel, Eddie Heywood) – 2:32
2. "Sing a Rainbow" performed with The Williams Family Children (Arthur Hamilton) – 2:40
3. "Dream" performed with The Williams Brothers (Johnny Mercer) – 2:40
4. "This Is All I Ask" (Gordon Jenkins) – 3:19
5. "Wives and Lovers" (Burt Bacharach, Hal David) – 2:20
6. "First Born" performed with The Entire Williams Family (John Lehman, Jerry Reed) – 2:41

=== Side two ===
1. "A Fool Never Learns" (Sonny Curtis) – 2:01
2. "Noelle" (Paul Kenny, Edward Pola, George Wyle) – 2:48
3. "Pennies from Heaven" performed with The Williams Brothers (Johnny Burke, Arthur Johnston) – 3:32
4. "September Song" (Maxwell Anderson, Kurt Weill) – 3:00
5. "Let It Be Me" performed with Claudine Longet (Gilbert Bécaud, Mann Curtis, Pierre Delanoë) – 2:51
6. "Softly, As I Leave You" (Giorgio Calabrese, Tony De Vita, Hal Shaper) – 3:13

== Charts ==
Chart (1964)	Peak position
US Top LPs (Billboard)	9
US Cashbox	8

=== Singles ===
Year	Title	U.S. Hot 100	U.S. Cashbox	U.S. AC	UK Singles
1964	"A Fool Never Learns"	13	13	4	40

== Recording dates ==
From the liner notes for the 2002 Collectables CD:

- January 13, 1963 – "Softly, As I Leave You"
- November 1, 1963 – "A Fool Never Learns"
- November 7, 1963 – "This Is All I Ask", "First Born", "Noelle", "September Song"
- November 27, 1963 – "Canadian Sunset"
- December 3, 1963 – "Sing a Rainbow", "Dream", "Wives and Lovers", "Pennies from Heaven", "Let It Be Me"

== Personnel ==
From the liner notes for the original album:

- Andy Williams – vocals
- The Williams Brothers – vocals
- Claudine Longet – vocals
- Robert Mersey – arranger, conductor, producer
- Frank Bez – photography
- Parker of Vienna, Inc. – sweaters

== Bibliography ==
- Whitburn, Joel (1985), Joel Whitburn's Top Pop Albums, 1955-1985, Record Research Inc., ISBN 0-89820-054-7
- Whitburn, Joel (1993), Joel Whitburn's Top Adult Contemporary, 1961-1993, Record Research Inc., ISBN 0-89820-099-7
- Whitburn, Joel (2009), Joel Whitburn's Top Pop Singles, 1955-2008, Record Research Inc., ISBN 0-89820-180-2
- Hoffmann, Frank W (1988), The Cash box album charts, 1955-1974, Scarecrow Press, ISBN 0-810-82005-6
- Larkin, Colin (2007), The Encyclopedia of Popular Music, Omnibus Press, ISBN 9-7818-4609-8567
- Downey, Pat (1994), Cash box pop singles charts, 1950-1993, Libraries Unlimited, ISBN 1-56308-316-7
