= Completely Cilla: 1963–1973 =

Compilation album by Cilla Black
- Released: 23 April 2012; 14 years ago
- Recorded: 1963–1972
- Genres: Pop, Adult contemporary
- Label: EMI
- Producer: George Martin

Cilla Black chronology
The Definitive Collection (2009)	Completely Cilla: 1963–1973 (2012)	The Very Best of Cilla Black (CD&DVD) (2013)

Completely Cilla: 1963–1973 is a compilation album released of music by British pop singer Cilla Black. The compilation album is a prelude to Black's 50th anniversary in show business (due in 2013) – it is the largest released compilation album of her music containing 139 digitally remastered recordings.

== Overview ==
Released as a six disc boxed set (five CDs + one bonus NTSC/Region 0 DVD) in the United Kingdom by EMI Records. The CDs include all of Black's recordings which were produced by George Martin – featured are all of her A-side and B-side singles released between 1963 and 1973 (18 of these were UK chart hits) plus the songs from 7 studio albums.

A bonus DVD is also supplied containing many full-length music performances from Black's BBC variety shows of the late '60s and early '70s (22 performances are previously unavailable). The Region 0 DVD is Black's first music DVD to notably be produced in the American NTSC colour format. Rare performances are included with Cliff Richard ("Passing Strangers") and Marvin, Welch & Farrar ("Norwegian Wood (This Bird Has Flown)").

== Digital release ==
All of the songs contained on the compilation's five CDs were also released worldwide as a digital download.

== Track listing ==
=== Disc One (CD) ===
1. "A Shot of Rhythm And Blues"
2. "Shy of Love"
3. "Love of the Loved"
4. "Anyone Who Had A Heart"
5. "Just For You"
6. "You're My World (Il Mio Mondo)"
7. "This Empty Place"
8. "Suffer Now I Must" [Mono]
9. "It's For You"
10. "He Won’t Ask Me"
11. "Is It Love?"
12. "(Love Is Like A) Heatwave"
13. "Love Letters"
14. "You'd Be So Nice to Come Home To"
15. "Ol' Man River"
16. "Every Little Bit Hurts"
17. "Come To Me"
18. "Baby It's You"
19. "I’m Not Alone Any More" [Stereo Version] ~
20. "One Little Voice (Uno Di Voi)"
21. "You've Lost That Lovin' Feelin'"
22. "Goin' Out of My Head"
23. "Dancing in the Street"
24. "Whatcha Gonna Do 'Bout It"
25. "Some Things You Never Get Used To"
26. "I’ve Been Wrong Before"
27. "I Don’t Want To Know"
28. "My Love Come Home"
29. "Poor Boy" [Mono]
30. "When I Fall in Love"
31. "(There's) No Place To Hide"

=== Disc Two (CD) ===
1. "The Cherry Song"
2. "Shotgun"
3. "Anytime You Need Me"
4. "Please Don’t Teach Me To Love You"
5. "Yesterday"
6. "In A Woman's Eyes"
7. "Baby I’m Yours"
8. "The Real Thing" [Stereo Version]
9. "One Two Three"
10. "Make It Easy on Yourself"
11. "Love's Just A Broken Heart (L’amour Est Ce Qu’il Est)"
12. "A Lover's Concerto"
13. "Everything I Touch Turns To Tears"
14. "Alfie"
15. "Night Time Is Here"
16. "Sing A Rainbow"
17. "Don’t Answer Me (Ti Vedo Uscire)"
18. "The Right One Is Left"
19. "A Fool Am I (Dimmelo Parlami)"
20. "For No One"
21. "Abyssinian Secret"
22. "Trees And Loneliness"
23. "Time"
24. "There I Go (Se Per Te C’e Soltanto Quell’uomo)"
25. "Only You Can Free My Mind"
26. "What Good Am I?"
27. "Over My Head"
28. "Misty Roses"
29. "All My Love (Solo Tu)"
30. "Follow Me"

=== Disc Three (CD) ===
1. "What The World Needs Now Is Love"
2. "Take Me in Your Arms And Love Me"
3. "This Is The First Time"
4. "I Only Live To Love You (Cosa Si Fa Stasera)"
5. "Suddenly You Love Me (Uno tranquillo)"
6. "From Now On"
7. "I Couldn’t Take My Eyes Off You"
8. "A Man and a Woman (Un Homme Et Une Femme)"
9. "Yo Yo"
10. "Follow The Path of the Stars"
11. "Work Is A Four Letter Word" (Film Version)
12. "Something's Gotten Hold of My Heart"
13. "Step Inside Love"
14. "Where Is Tomorrow? (Non C’è Domani)"
15. "Work Is A Four Letter Word"
16. "Your Heart Is Free (Just Like The Wind) (Le Vent Et La Jeunesse)"
17. "It’ll Never Happen Again"
18. "Liverpool Lullaby"
19. "Without Him"
20. "Forget Him"
21. "Think of Me (Siamo Qui)"
22. "I Am A Woman"
23. "Surround Yourself with Sorrow"
24. "Only Forever Will Do (Prigioniero Del Mondo)"
25. "London Bridge"
26. "Aquarius"
27. "Red Rubber Ball"
28. "You'll Never Get To Heaven (If You Break My Heart)"

=== Disc Four (CD) ===
1. "Words"
2. "Conversations"
3. "On A Street Called Hope"
4. "For Once in My Life"
5. "Little Pleasure Acre"
6. "I Can’t Go on Living Without You"
7. "It Feels So Good"
8. "If I Thought You'd Ever Change Your Mind"
9. "Black Paper Roses"
10. "Rule Brittania"
11. "Sweet Inspiration"
12. "Put A Little Love in Your Heart"
13. "The April Fools"
14. "Both Sides Now"
15. "Mysterious People (Det Gatfulla Folket)"
16. "Dear Madame"
17. "Oh Pleasure Man"
18. "Across The Universe"
19. "Your Song"
20. "It's Different Now"
21. "Sad Sad Song"
22. "Child of Mine"
23. "Faded Images"
24. "That's Why I Love You"
25. "Junk"
26. "The First of May"

=== Disc Five (CD) ===
1. "(They Long To Be) Close To You"
2. "Make It With You"
3. "Rainbow"
4. "Our Brand New World"
5. "Bridge Over Troubled Water"
6. "Just Friends"
7. "Down in the City"
8. "Help Me Jesus"
9. "Sleep Song"
10. "Something Tells Me (Something's Gonna Happen Tonight)"
11. "The World I Wish For You"
12. "La La La Lu"
13. "Thank Heavens I’ve Got You"
14. "I Hate Sunday"
15. "I’ve Still Got My Heart Joe"
16. "I Don't Know How To Love Him"
17. "Gypsys, Tramps & Thieves"
18. "Oh My Love"
19. "Without You"
20. "The Long And Winding Road"
21. "Winterwood"
22. "Day By Day"
23. "You You You"
24. "Silly Wasn't I?"

=== Disc Six (Bonus NTSC/Region 0 DVD) ===
1. "Suddenly You Love Me (Uno Tranquillo)" [1968]
2. "One Two Three" [1968]
3. "Step Inside Love" [1968]
4. "Misty Roses" [1968]
5. "Love's Just A Broken Heart (L’amour Est Ce Qu’il Est)" [1968]
6. "Where Is Tomorrow? (Non C’è Domani)" [1968]
7. "You'll Never Get to Heaven (If You Break My Heart)" [1969]
8. "Surround Yourself With Sorrow" [1969]
9. "Mysterious People (Det Gatfulla Folket)" [1970]
10. "(They Long To Be) Close To You" [1971]
11. "Sing A Rainbow" [1971]
12. "What The World Needs Now Is Love" [1971]
13. "The World I Wish For You" [1972]
14. "You You You" [1972]
15. "Winterwood" [1973]
16. "The Long And Winding Road" [1973]
17. "I’ve Still Got My Heart Joe" [1973]
18. "Oh My Love" [1973]
19. "Day By Day" [1973]
20. "I Don't Know How to Love Him" [1973]
21. "Baby We Can’t Go Wrong" [1974]
22. "I’ll Have To Say I Love You, In A Song" [1974]
23. "Flashback" [1974]
24. "He Was A Writer" [1974]
25. "(I Wanted To Call It) Off" [1977]
26. Desert Island Discs Interview with Roy Plomley – Audio Only Interview; Mono [1964] (DVD's Bonus Feature)
27. "Passing Strangers" with Cliff Richard [1968] (DVD's Bonus Feature)
28. "Norwegian Wood (This Bird Has Flown)" with Marvin, Welch & Farrar [1971] (DVD's Bonus Feature)
29. "Something Tells Me (Something's Gonna Happen Tonight)" – Opening Sequence for the BBC TV Show 'Cilla' [1973] (DVD's Bonus Feature)

== Credits ==
Personnel

- Lead Vocals by Cilla Black
- Guest Vocals by Cliff Richard & Marvin, Welch & Farrar
- Backing Vocals by The Breakaways
- Executive Producer of the Compilation Album: Robert Willis Jnr. (Cilla Black's Manager & Son)
