= The Best of Cilla Black =

Greatest hits album by Cilla Black
- Released: November 1968
- Recorded: 1963–1968
- Studio: EMI Studios, London
- Genre: Pop
- Label: Parlophone/EMI
- Producer: George Martin

Cilla Black chronology
The Best of Cilla Black (1968)	The Very Best of Cilla Black (1983)

Professional ratings
Review scores
Source	Rating
AllMusic	4.5/5 stars

The Best of Cilla Black is a greatest hits album by Cilla Black. It was first released in 1968 and originally included 14 of her biggest hit singles, a selection of B-sides and album tracks, released between 1963 and 1968. Many of these tracks had not been previously available on an album. It was usual in this period for artists to record songs exclusively for single release only. The album reached number 21 on the UK Albums Chart.

== Re–release ==
The stereo sound recordings from The Best of Cilla Black were re-issued on CD in 2002. This release also included 11 bonus tracks, again all singles, that had been released between 1969 and 1977. The first 17 tracks were produced by George Martin, after 1972 David Mackay was the chosen producer for Cilla Black's remaining albums at EMI, with exception of the 1978 album Modern Priscilla which was produced by Mike Hurst.

On 7 September 2009, EMI Records released a special mono collector's edition of the album exclusively to digital download. This re-issue features all of the album's original recordings re-mastered by Abbey Road Studios from original 1/4" mono master tapes. A digital booklet containing original album artwork, detailed track information and rare photographs was available from iTunes with purchases of the entire album re-issue.

== Track listing ==
1. "Love of the Loved" (John Lennon, Paul McCartney) 1963 single release peaked at No. 35 in the UK Charts
2. "Anyone Who Had a Heart" (Burt Bacharach, Hal David) 1964 single release peaked at No. 1 in the UK Charts
3. "You're My World" (Il Mio Mondo) (Umberto Bindi, Gino Paoli, Carl Sigman) 1964 single release peaked at No. 1 in the UK Charts
4. "You've Lost That Lovin' Feelin'" (Phil Spector, Barry Mann, Cynthia Weil) 1965 single release peaked at No. 2 in the UK Charts
5. "Love's Just A Broken Heart" (L'Amour Est Ce Qu'il Est) (Mort Shuman, Kenny Lynch, Michele Vendome) 1966 single release peaked at No. 5 in the UK Charts
6. "Alfie" (Burt Bacharach, Hal David) 1966 single release peaked at No. 9 in the UK Charts
7. "I Only Live to Love You" (Cosa Si Fa Stasera) (Gene Colonnello, Norman Newell) 1967 single release peaked at No. 26 in the UK Charts
8. "What Good Am I?" (Mort Shuman, Kenny Lynch) 1967 single release peaked at No. 24 in the UK Charts
9. "Step Inside Love" (John Lennon, Paul McCartney) 1968 single release peaked at No. 8 in the UK Charts
10. "Where is Tomorrow?" (Non c'è Domani) (Umberto Bindi, Mason) 1968 single release peaked at No. 39 in the UK Charts
11. "Sing a Rainbow" (Arthur Hamilton) 1966 issued on the album Cilla Sings a Rainbow
12. "It's for You" (John Lennon, Paul McCartney) 1964 issued on the EP It's for You peaked at No. 12 in the UK Charts
13. "Yesterday" (Lennon–McCartney) 1966 B-side of "Love's Just A Broken Heart" (L'Amour Est Ce Qu'il Est)
14. "Goin' Out of My Head" (Teddy Randazzo, Bobby Weinstein) 1965 issued on the album Cilla

=== 2002 CD bonus tracks ===
1. "Surround Yourself with Sorrow" (Bill Martin, Phil Coulter) 1969 single release peaked at No. 3 in the UK Charts
2. "Conversations" (Roger Greenaway, Roger Cook, Jerry Lordan) 1969 single release peaked at No. 7 in the UK Charts
3. "Something Tells Me (Something's Gonna Happen Tonight)" (Roger Greenaway, Roger Cook) 1971 single release peaked at No. 3 in the UK Charts
4. "Baby We Can't Go Wrong" (J. Dunning) 1974 single release peaked at No. 36 in the UK Charts
5. "Someone" (Tony Cole, Steve Wolf) 1974 B-side of "Baby We Can't Go Wrong"
6. "I'll Have to Say I Love You in A Song" (Jim Croce) 1974 single release
7. "He Was A Writer" (Gloria Sklerov, Molly-Ann Leiken) 1974 single release
8. "Alfie Darling" (Alan Price) 1975 single release
9. "It's Now" (Walt Meskell, Tim Martin) 1976 B-side of "Little Things Mean a Lot"
10. "I Believe (When I Fall in Love It Will Be Forever)" (Stevie Wonder, Yvonne Wright) 1976 B-side of "Easy in Your Company"
11. "I Wanted to Call it Off" (Stevenson, Henn) 1977 single release

== Chart positions ==
Chart (1968)	Peak position
UK Albums Chart	21
