= The Cavaliers Drum and Bugle Corps =

Junior drum and bugle corps based in Rosemont, Illinois

- The Cavaliers official logo
- Location: Rosemont, Illinois
- Division: World Class
- Founded: 1948
- Director: Daniel Belcher
- Championship titles: American Legion: 1966; 1967; 1969; VFW: 1957; 1959; 1961; 1962; 1963; 1967; 1972; 1974; 1976; 1980 (tie); DCI: 1992; 1995; 2000 (tie); 2001; 2002; 2004; 2006
- Website: cavaliers.org

The Cavaliers' 70th Anniversary logo, 2018

The Cavaliers Drum and Bugle Corps (also known as "The Green Machine") is a World Class competitive junior drum and bugle corps based in Rosemont, Illinois. The Cavaliers were one of the thirteen founding member corps of Drum Corps International and is a seven-time DCI World Champion. The Cavaliers are the only active all-male corps remaining in the activity.

== History ==
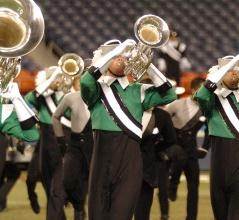
The Cavaliers, 2004.

=== The early days ===
The Cavaliers Drum and Bugle Corps was started in 1948 by Don Warren, Scoutmaster of Boy Scout Troop 111 in Chicago's Logan Square neighborhood after being impressed by the Racine Scouts. In 1949, the corps found an additional sponsor in the American Legion Thaddeus Kosciuszko Post 712 of Chicago's Little Warsaw neighborhood. This sponsorship allowed the corps to purchase new uniforms.

The corps entered the world of field competition for the first time in 1950, adopting the name of Chicago Cavaliers and green as their main color. Following a promotional campaign by Cavalier Cigarettes, the corps adopted the Cavalier name and the logo of the cigarette brand as the corps' logo (the "Standing Man").

After being an also-ran for their first two seasons of field competition, the Cavaliers won their first contest in 1952 Class B competition at the Spectacle of Music in South Milwaukee. The same year, they competed in their first American Legion Junior National Championship in New York City, finishing in seventh place. In 1956, the Cavaliers had risen to the number one ranking in the Midwest, and in 1957, the Cavaliers won the VFW National title in Miami, as well as both the Illinois State American Legion and VFW titles. The Cavaliers won the VFW championship again in 1959.

=== 1960s ===
By 1960, the financial needs of the corps was struggling to be supported by the American Legion Kosciusko Post and the Chicago's Own VFW Post, but the temporary banning of bingo and other similar fundraisers by the State of Illinois was an almost crippling blow. As part of the solution to the ongoing problems of money and recruiting, in 1961, the Chicago's Own VFW was replaced by the Park Ridge VFW Post 3579, marking the beginning of the Cavaliers' move from being a city corps to suburban. The Cavaliers won VFW national three years in a row, 1961–63. In 1963, the corps traveled to Canada for the Toronto Optimist's "International" competition.

In 1964, The Cavaliers added mellophones and contrabasses to their horn line. 1967 saw Cavalier Hall go up in flames, taking the corps' trophies with it. They won the VFW Nationals, then repeated as American Legion Champions. The corps rebounded in 1969, winning the American Legion title. The highlight of 1970 was the Cavaliers' rise from eleventh place at VFW National prelims to third place in finals.

=== The Combine ===
In 1971, at the urging of Don Warren and Troopers founder Jim Jones, the Blue Stars, Cavaliers, Madison Scouts, Santa Clara Vanguard, the Argonne Rebels and the Troopers formed the Combine. This action was taken in reaction to the rigid, inflexible rules of the American Legion and VFW (the primary rule makers and sponsors of both corps and shows) and the low or nonexistent performance fees paid for appearing in the various competitions. The Combine members stated that the corps should be making their own rules, operating their own competitions and championships, and keeping the bulk of the monies those shows earned. For the 1971 season, the corps stuck together, offering show promoters the five corps as a package. Despite pressure on show sponsors, judges, and other drum corps, the Combine corps were not only booked into a number of shows together, but they found a host for a show of their own, which was a spectacular success despite fears of failure. But in 1971 was not as much of a success for the Cavaliers: the corps fell to eighth at CYO Nationals and, with most of the top corps opting for VFW Nationals, they finished in second, two points behind the Argonne Rebels at the Legion Nationals.

=== The beginning of DCI ===
In 1972, The Cavaliers, along with the nine other corps from the Combine and the Alliance, as well as the Anaheim Kingsmen, Argonne Rebels, and De La Salle Oaklands, were founding members of Drum Corps International, which remains as the sanctioning body for junior corps in North America. At the first DCI World Championships in Whitewater, Wisconsin, The Cavaliers finished in ninth place. The 1972 Cavaliers also won another VFW National Championship in Minneapolis, their seventh. In 1973, the Cavaliers finished in fifteenth place at DCI in Whitewater during a season of financial difficulties and struggles with recruitment.

Over the next four years, 1974–77, The Cavaliers seemed to have rebounded somewhat from the down year of '73. Two years in eighth place were followed by two years in seventh place at DCI. They also won two more VFW National Championships in 1974 and '76. There was an unacknowledged drug problem that came to a head in 1977 when several members almost died while returning from a show, and due to disagreement within the corps, it managed only a sixteenth place finish at DCI. Also in 1977, Adolph DeGrauwe was named as corps director.

=== 1980-1992 ===
The Cavaliers' winter guard, under the leadership of Steve Brubaker, won the Winter Guard International championship in 1981–83. In 1982, Brubaker, who had also been working with the Cavalier Cadets corps since '78, was named head drill designer for The Cavaliers. That change brought about a change in the corps' attitude and this, along with the music selections becoming more and more classically oriented, helped The Cavaliers rise to the top half of DCI Finalists. 1982 saw The Cavaliers forge a solid association with the Village of Rosemont and its mayor, Donald E. Stephens, a relationship that would relieve the corps of many financial worries. The corps improved for the next several years, finishing second place at DCI Finals in 1990 behind the Cadets of Bergen County.

1990 saw The Cavaliers start the transition to three valve horns, and it was the year of The Cavaliers' very first DCI Regional championship, when they upset the previously undefeated Blue Devils and Phantom Regiment to win DCI Midwest at Whitewater.

Before the start of the 1991 season, Adolph DeGrauwe stepped down as Corps director, and was replaced by Jeff Fiedler. In 1991, they won both DCI East and DCI South, again finishing second place. At Dallas, the percussion ensemble won the Individual and Ensemble contest with a perfect 100.00 score. In 1992, The Cavaliers won their first DCI championship with their show titled "Revolution and Triumph".

=== 1993 - Present ===
The 1993 season was difficult before it ever began; drill designer Steve Brubaker died during the off-season. Once the season got underway, everything was overshadowed by the previous year's success. Star once more left The Cavaliers in second at DCM, they trailed both Star and the Cadets at DCI North and the Preview of Champions, but they won DCI East over the Blue Devils. The DCI World Championships were held in hot and humid Jackson, Mississippi. It got even more humid, when the rains came during Finals; several Cavaliers slipped and fell, and the corps fell to fifth place. In 1994, The Cavaliers' program showcased the corps' guard. It won the DCM crown, but it was only good enough for second-place finishes in Regionals and fourth at DCI Finals in Boston. Gustav Holst's "The Planets" had been a crowd-pleaser and had earned The Cavaliers their first finish in the upper half of DCI's Top Twelve as the largest part of the show in 1985. In 1995, The Cavaliers brought back "The Planets" as their entire show. The Cavaliers traded wins with the Madison Scouts through the DCM season, with the Scouts taking the DCM title. They continued to trail only Madison at DCI Southwest in Houston and until the Preview of Champions in Ypsilanti, when they found themselves ahead of Madison but behind BD and the Cadets. DCI Mid-America at Champaign, Illinois also went to the Blue Devils. At the DCI World Championships in Buffalo, The Cavaliers took command in Quarterfinals, expanded their lead in Semi-finals and Finals, and won their second DCI Championship in four years.

Before the 1996 season, The Cavaliers traveled to Japan. The corps won DCM and both DCI Mid-America and DCI East, but dropped to fourth place at DCI in Orlando, Florida. The 1997 season saw wins in only three minor shows, and The Cavaliers' return of "The Firebird" slipped to seventh place at DCI Finals. In 1998, The Cavaliers reclaimed the DCM title, but they failed to win any of three DCI Regionals, and they finished in fourth place at the World Championships, held for the third consecutive year in Orlando. The 1999 season was much like the one before, except that the Green Machine moved up to third place at DCI Championships in Madison. As the Twentieth Century came to a close, The Cavaliers performed a show of Michael Daugherty's "Niagara Falls" and an original composition by Richard Saucedo. They lost an early show to The Cadets, lost their home show and DCI Midwestern in Indianapolis to the Blue Devils, but they won three other DCI Regionals: Drums Along the Rockies in Denver, DCI Mid-America in Murfreesboro, Tennessee, and DCI East in Allentown. At the DCI Championships in College Park, Maryland, The Cavaliers were three-tenths of a point behind The Cadets in both Quarterfinals and Semi-finals, but added nearly a point to their Finals score and tied The Cadets for their third DCI World Championship of the decade.

The Twenty-first Century opened for The Cavaliers much as the Twentieth had ended. The 2001 program of Saucedo's "Four Corners" won DCM, was second to Blue Devils at DCI Southwestern in San Antonio, then won DCI Mid-America in Murfreesboro, DCI Midwestern in Indianapolis, and DCI Eastern in Philadelphia. Although they lost several shows to both BD and The Cadets, The Cavaliers took command at the DCI championships in Buffalo, winning Quarterfinals, Semi-finals, and Finals for their first consecutive championships since winning the American Legion Nationals in 1966 and '67. 2002 was much like 1961 had been; with an original program of "Frameworks" by Richard Saucedo, Bret Kuhn, and Erik Johnson, The Cavaliers won, and they won again and again and again. They won DCM and then won three DCI Regionals, the Southwestern in San Antonio, the Midwestern in Indianapolis, and Drums Along the Rockies in Denver. When The Cavaliers swept through the three rounds at the DCI World Championships in Madison with unheard of score margins of 1.75 to 1.95 points, the corps had not only won a three-peat, but they had earned the second undefeated season in the corps' history. Additionally, The Cavaliers set a world record for highest ever score in DCI history twice: 99.05 in Semifinals and 99.15 in Finals. This latter score remained unbeaten for several years until tied by The Cadets in 2005 and then beaten by The Blue Devils in 2014.

From August 2, 2001, through July 25, 2003, The Cavaliers won a DCI record sixty-four (64) contests in a row. The 2003 show, "Spin Cycle" by Richard Saucedo won the last DCM Championship before the top corps abandoned the circuit, and the DCI Southwestern Regional before The Blue Devils caught up and won both the Midwestern Regional and DCI East. The two corps went into DCI Championships in Orlando seemingly neck-and-neck, but the Devils dominated the Championships, and rather than The Cavaliers getting their sixth crown, the Devils gained their eleventh. In 2004, the corps hosted a percussion reunion; Cavalier drummers from 1948 through 2004, including every snare drummer since 1961, gathered to play together. Then The Cavaliers' "007" show of tunes from James Bond movies powered through the season, losing once to the Devils and twice to The Cadets en route to the sixth DCI title that had eluded the corps the previous year. After the DCI Championships in Denver, The Cavaliers, The Cadets, Madison Scouts, Phantom Regiment, Blue Devils, and Santa Clara Vanguard, the winners of all but two DCI Championships made a four show tour through California. In early 2008, Jeff Fiedler stepped down after seventeen years as The Cavaliers' director. He was replaced by former director Adolph DeGrauwe. After their 2006 title, a gradual decline became the norm, even though The Cavaliers remained in the top four at DCI Finals unitl 2011. However 2012 saw a meteoric drop to 8th, seventh in 2013, and sixth in 2014. They then returned to DCI's top four in 2017.

In addition to the drum and bugle corps, The Cavaliers Arts, Performance & Education, Inc. also sponsors Chromium Winds, an indoor winds group that competes in WGI.

== Show summary (1972–2026) ==
Key
Pale blue background indicates DCI World Class Finalist (Note: From 1972 to 1991, the Cavaliers competed in Open Class; from 1992 to 2007 in Division I, and since 2008 in World Class. These are the same tier, just renamed.)
Dark gold background indicates DCI World Class Champion

Year	Repertoire	World Championships	
Year	Repertoire	Score	Placement
1972	March of the Toreadors (from Carmen) by Georges Bizet / One Hand One Heart (from West Side Story) by Leonard Bernstein / The Ballad of Casey Jones by Eddie Newton, Wallace Saunders & T. Lawrence Seibert / "Eleanor Rigby" by Lennon–McCartney / Salute to the Green (Unknown) / Over the Rainbow (from The Wizard of Oz) by Harold Arlen & E.Y. Harburg / Americans We by Henry Fillmore / I'm Always Chasing Rainbows by Frédéric Chopin, adapted by Harry Carroll & Joseph McCarthy / Look for the Rainbow by Burton Lane & E.Y. Harburg	79.450	9th place Open Class; Finalist
1973	Tradition & Sabbath Prayer (from Fiddler on the Roof) by Jerry Bock & Sheldon Harnick / Pinball Wizard (from Tommy) by Pete Townshend / All for the Best & We Beseech Thee (from Godspell) by Stephen Schwartz	74.650; 76.300 (Note: Because of a tabulation error in the General Effect caption, the Cavaliers' score was listed as 74.650, putting the corps in 15th place. Their score should have been 76.300 and their placement 13th. The Cavaliers told DCI to leave the standings as is, because the corps would not have made Finals even with the change.)	15th place Open Class (official); 13th place (actual)
1974	March of the Toreadors (from Carmen) by Georges Bizet / Victory at Sea by Richard Rodgers / Tommy Can You Hear Me (from Tommy) by Pete Townshend / All for the Best (from Godspell) by Stephen Schwartz / Once Upon A Time (from All American) by Charles Strouse & Lee Adams / Somewhere (from West Side Story) by Leonard Bernstein / Over the Rainbow (from The Wizard of Oz) by Harold Arlen & E.Y. Harburg	79.550	8th place Open Class; Finalist
1975	Russian Christmas Music by Alfred Reed / Time Odyssey 7534 by Dan Spaulding / Love in Them There Hills by Roland Chambers / Entrance to Reality (from The Picasso Summer) by Michel Legrand / Once Upon A Time (from All American) by Charles Strouse & Lee Adams / Somewhere (from West Side Story) by Leonard Bernstein / Over the Rainbow (from The Wizard of Oz) by Harold Arlen & E.Y. Harburg	82.950	8th place Open Class; Finalist
1976	Russian Sailor's Dance (from The Red Poppy) by Reinhold Glière / Green Soul by Dan Spaulding / Chump Change by Bill Cosby & Quincy Jones / Give It One by Alan Downey & Maynard Ferguson / Summertime & Bess, You Is My Woman Now (from Porgy and Bess) by George Gershwin and Ira Gershwin / Firebird Suite by Igor Stravinsky	84.300	7th place Open Class; Finalist
1977	Selections from Man of La Mancha by Mitch Leigh & Joe Darion / Selections from Porgy and Bess by George Gershwin & Ira Gershwin	83.000	7th place Open Class; Finalist
1978	Do Ya Wanna Get Funky With Me? by Peter Brown & Robert Rans / Russian Sailor's Dance (from The Red Poppy) by Reinhold Glière / Pineapple Rag by Scott Joplin / Symphony No. 5 by Dmitri Shostakovich	78.300	16th place Open Class
1979	Esmeralda Suite by Jimmy Goings & Nicolas Skorsky (Santa Esmeralda) / Fantasy by Maurice White, Verdine White & Eddie del Barrio (Earth, Wind & Fire) / Cuban Fire Suite by Johnny Richards / Over the Rainbow (from The Wizard of Oz) by Harold Arlen & E.Y. Harburg / Children of Sanchez by Chuck Mangione	78.500	11th place Open Class; Finalist
1980	Esmeralda Suite by Jimmy Goings & Nicolas Skorsky (Santa Esmeralda) / Suncatchers by Butch Nordahl / Sing, Sing, Sing (With a Swing) by Louis Prima / Sambandrea Swing by Don Menza / "Softly As I Leave You" by Giorgio Calabrese & Antonio De Vita, adapted by Hal Shaper	77.400	9th place Open Class; Finalist
1981	Picasso Suite (from The Picasso Summer) by Michel Legrand / Sing, Sing, Sing (With a Swing) by Louis Prima / Sambandrea Swing by Don Menza / Softly As I Leave You by Giorgio Calabrese & Antonio De Vita, adapted by Hal Shaper	82.800	10th place Open Class; Finalist
1982	The Pines of Rome by Ottorino Respighi / Heliopolis by Jay Beckenstein / City (Unknown) / I've Had Enough by Philip Bailey, Greg Phillinganes & Brenda Russell / Ai No Corrida by Kenny Young / Softly As I Leave You by Giorgio Calabrese & Antonio De Vita, adapted by Hal Shaper	81.950	11th place Open Class; Finalist
1983	Jade by Michael Boo / Celebration Suite by Chick Corea / Rendezvous by Al Dimeola / The Pines of Rome by Ottorino Respighi	80.550	9th place Open Class; Finalist
1984	Don Juan by Richard Strauss / Summer Sketches by Hugh M. Stuart / Ozark by John Prescott / The Pines of Rome by Ottorino Respighi	89.700	8th place Open Class; Finalist
1985	Also Sprach Zarathustra by Richard Strauss / Mars, Mercury, Uranus & Jupiter (from The Planets) by Gustav Holst	94.100	5th place Open Class; Finalist
1986	Canzona by Peter Mennin / Variations on a Korean Folk Song by John Barnes Chance / Gamelon (Drum Feature) / Mars (from The Planets) by Gustav Holst	95.700	3rd place Open Class; Finalist
1987	Festival Variations by Claude T. Smith / Variations on a Korean Folk Song by John Barnes Chance / Liturgical Dances by David Holsinger	94.700	3rd place Open Class; Finalist
1988	The Firebird Suite by Igor Stravinsky	95.100	5th place Open Class; Finalist
1989	Gloria; Gloria – Andante and Allegro Vivace by John Rutter / Images Diabolique by Tom Grant / Gloria – Vivace E Ritmico by John Rutter	97.200	3rd place Open Class; Finalist
1990	Cavalier Anthems; Homage to Machaut (from Medieval Suite) by Ron Nelson / Variations on a Hymn by Louis Bourgeois by Claude T. Smith / All Things Bright and Beautiful; O, Clap Your Hands & Gloria (Mvt. 3) by John Rutter	96.900	2nd place Open Class; Finalist
1991	Cavalier Anthems: An Advent Collection; Variants on an Advent Hymn by Fisher Tull / Te Deum by Ron Nelson / Die Natale by Samuel Barber / Men of Goodwill by Benjamin Britten / The Bridegroom by John Rutter / O Be Joyful in the Lord by John Rutter	96.300	2nd place Open Class; Finalist
1992	Revolution and Triumph; Gavorkna Fanfare by Jack Stamp / Cornish Dances, Mvt. 4; English Dances, Mvt. 4 & Peterloo Overture by Sir Malcolm Arnold	97.500	1st place Division I Champion
1993	Heroes, A Symphonic Trilogy (Journey... Conflict... Triumph); The Symphonic Cantata by David Holsinger / Heroes, Lost and Fallen by David Gillingham / Morning Alleluias (for the Winter Solstice) by Ron Nelson	94.000	5th place Division I Finalist
1994	Rituals; Sensemaya by Silvestre Revueltas / Humming Chorus (from Ivan the Terrible) by Sergei Prokofiev / War Dance (from Belkis, Regina di Saba) & Church Windows, Mvt. 2 by Ottorino Respighi / March (from Symphonic Metamorphosis) by Paul Hindemith	95.700	4th place Division I Finalist
1995	The Planets; Mars, Venus, Mercury & Jupiter; All from The Planets by Gustav Holst	98.300	1st place Division I Champion
1996	Pan American Sketches; Pavana (from Tres versiones sinfónicas) by Julián Orbón / Mexican Landscape (from Latin American Sketches) by Aaron Copland / Xylophone (from Tres versiones sinfónicas) by Julián Orbón / Piano Sonata No. 1, Mvt. 4 by Alberto Ginastera / Symphony No. 3, Mvt. 4 by Aaron Copland	93.800	4th place Division I Finalist
1997	The Firebird; Introduction to Rite of Spring and Berceuse, Carrilon, Retinue, Infernal Dance & Finale; All from The Firebird Suite by Igor Stravinsky	92.800	7th place Division I Finalist
1998	Traditions for a New Era; The Path Between the Mountains by Jay Kennedy / Molto Vivo & Lento (from Dance Movements) by Philip Sparke / Machine by William Bolcom	96.200	4th place Division I Finalist
1999	Classical Innovations; Fantasia for Band in G Major by Timothy Mahr / Fantasies on a Theme by Haydn by Norman Dello Joio	97.000	3rd place Division I Finalist
2000	Niagara Falls; Niagara Falls by Michael Daugherty / Original music by Richard Saucedo	97.650	1st place Division I Champion (Note: In 2000, the Cavaliers and the Cadets tied for 1st place.)
2001	Four Corners; Four Corners by Richard Saucedo, Bret Kuhn & Erik Johnson	98.350	1st place Division I Champion
2002	Frameworks; Melody, Harmony & Rhythm; All by Richard Saucedo, Bret Kuhn & Erik Johnson	99.150	1st place Division I Champion
2003	Spin Cycle; Propulsion, Resonance, Terminal Velocity & Centrifugal Force; All by Richard Saucedo	97.250	2nd place Division I Finalist
2004	007; James Bond Theme by Monty Norman / Goldeneye by Bono & The Edge / For Your Eyes Only by Bill Conti / Live and Let Die by Paul McCartney & Linda McCartney / Hovercraft Chase & Welcome to Cuba (from Die Another Day) & Paris and Bond (from Tomorrow Never Dies) by David Arnold	98.700	1st place Division I Champion
2005	My Kind of Town; Chicago by Sammy Cahn / The Magnificent Mile (Unknown) / Jig by Jean-Luc Ponty / The Great Fire of 1871 by Richard Saucedo, Bret Kuhn & Erik Johnson / Chicago Blues by Richard Saucedo, Bret Kuhn & Erik Johnson / Sweet Home Chicago by Robert Johnson	97.625	2nd place Division I Finalist
2006	Machine; Genesis, Wired, Premonition & The Machine Age by Richard Saucedo & James Casella / Church: Renewing Vows by Wynton Marsalis	97.200	1st place Division I Champion
2007	And So It Goes; The Stranger, Angry Young Man, And So It Goes, Invention in C Minor, Pressure, I've Loved These Days & Scenes From An Italian Restaurant; All by Billy Joel	96.350	3rd place Division I Finalist
2008	Samurai; Bushido: The Way of the Warrior; Ronin: Masterless Samurai; Ken-Jutsu: The Art of the Sword & Fumeiyo Yori Shi Wo: Death Before Dishonor; All by Richard Saucedo, Erik Johnson & James Casella	97.325	3rd place World Class; Finalist
2009	The Great Divide; Extreme Make-over by Johan de Meij / Pampeana No. 3 – Impetuosamente by Alberto Ginastera / Engulfed Cathedral by Claude Debussy / On the Great Divide by John Adams	96.150	4th place World Class; Finalist
2010	Mad World; Mad World by Roland Orzabal / Harrison's Dream by Peter Graham / Dismantling Utopia by Pat Metheny, Lyle Mays, Steve Rodby & Paul Wertico / Smile by Charlie Chaplin, John Turner & Geoffrey Parsons	97.750	2nd place World Class; Finalist
2011	XtraordinarY; Footprints by Wayne Shorter / Jungle Tango by Jamie Masefield, Danton Boller & Ari Hoenig (The Jazz Mandolin Project) / Nature Boy by George Alexander Aberle (eden ahbez) / Fugue in G Minor by Johann Sebastian Bach	96.850	3rd place World Class; Finalist
2012	15 Minutes of Fame; Don Juan by Richard Strauss / Dead Elvis by Michael Daugherty / Paparazzi by Stefani Germanotta (Lady Gaga) & Rob Fusari / Don Giovanni by Wolfgang Amadeus Mozart / Vesti la Giubba by Ruggero Leoncavallo / Out Here on My Own by Michael Gore / In the Hall of the Mountain King (from Peer Gynt Suite No. 1) by Edvard Grieg	88.850	8th place World Class; Finalist
2013	Secret Society; Rose of Arimathea (from The Da Vinci Code) by Hans Zimmer / Air (from Angels & Demons) by Hans Zimmer / Drum Music (Mvt. 3: Incinerate) by John Mackey / Secret Society by Drew Shanefield / Enterprising Young Men (from Star Trek) by Michael Giacchino	90.500	7th place World Class; Finalist
2014	Immortal; Chamber Symphony Opus 110 by Dmitri Shostakovich / Danse Macabre by Camille Saint-Saëns / When I am Laid in Earth by Henry Purcell / A Walk on the Water by Stephen Melillo	93.675	6th place World Class; Finalist
2015	Game On; Symphony No. 8 by Anton Bruckner / Fêtes (from Nocturnes) by Claude Debussy / Run Boy Run by Yoann Lemoine (Woodkid) / In the Musicals by Bjork / Macrotus (from Batman Begins) by Hans Zimmer & James Newton Howard / Fantasie Brillante (from On the Shoulders of Giants) by Peter Graham	88.325	9th place World Class; Finalist
2016	Propaganda; Music for the Funeral of Queen Mary by Henry Purcell / Symphony for West Point Band by Morton Gould / Elegy for Dunkirk by Dario Marianelli / Lollapalooza by John Adams	94.025	5th place World Class; Finalist
2017	Men Are From Mars; Kangaru by Jóhann Jóhannsson / Also Sprach Zarathustra by Richard Strauss / Fanfare for the Common Man by Aaron Copland / Wine Dark Sea by John Mackey / Little Green Men by Steve Vai / Theme from Close Encounters of the Third Kind by John Williams / On the Nature of Daylight by Max Richter / O Superman by Laurie Anderson / Sun's Gone Dim by Jóhann Jóhannsson / Mars (from The Planets) by Gustav Holst / My Way by Claude François & Jacques Revaux, adapted by Paul Anka	95.200	4th place World Class; Finalist
2018	On Madness and Creativity; Black Angels by George Crumb / The Triumph of Time by Peter Graham / Bolero by Maurice Ravel / Rose of Arimathea (from The Da Vinci Code) by Hans Zimmer / Orawa By Wojciech Kilar / Vanishing Act by Lou Reed / Alicia Discovers Nash's Dark World (from A Beautiful Mind) by James Horner / Unraveled by Michael Martin, Mike McIntosh, & Alan Miller / Over the Rainbow (from The Wizard of Oz) by Harold Arlen & E.Y. Harburg / Oh What a World by Rufus Wainwright	93.2125	6th place World Class; Finalist
2019	The Wrong Side of the Tracks; Gorgon by Christopher Rouse / Bum's Rush by Donald Grantham / Rock Island, 1931 by Thomas Newman / Party in Steerage by Mike McIntosh & Clif Walker / Cathedral by Thomas Newman	95.400	5th place World Class; Finalist
2020	Season canceled due to the COVID-19 pandemic		
2021	LIVE! From The Rose; Lida Rose (from The Music Man) by Meredith Willson / La Vie En Rose by Edith Piaf / Themata by Drew Goddard (Karnivool) / Arose (from American Beauty) by Thomas Newman / Kiss From A Rose by Seal / Sing, Sing, Sing (With a Swing) by Louis Prima	No scored competitions	
2022	Signs of the Times; Fugue in G Minor by Johann Sebastian Bach / Fly Like an Eagle by Steve Miller Band / Way Too Long by Bent Knee / Original music by Michael Martin / The Floor is Lava by Bent Knee / Concerto No. 10 for Brass Band by Ludovic Neurohr / Queer Gods & Being Human by Bent Knee / Sign of the Times by Harry Styles	90.600	9th place World Class; Finalist
2023	...Where You’ll Find Me; Gloria – Allegro Vivace by John Rutter / Groove 75 by Richard Saucedo, Michael McIntosh, Clif Walker & Matt Black / Over the Rainbow (from The Wizard of Oz) by Harold Arlen & E.Y. Harburg / Softly As I Leave You by Matt Monroe	92.125	8th place World Class; Finalist
2024	Beneath the Armor; I Want You to Want Me by Rick Nielsen / Music for Prague 1968 by Karel Husa / You've Changed by Bill Carey and Carl Fischer / Man in the Mirror by Glen Ballard and Siedah Garrett / Bring Me to Life by Amy Lee, Ben Moody, and David Hodges / Original music by Richard Saucedo, Michael McIntosh, Clif Walker & Matt Black	87.500	11th place World Class; Finalist
2025	ShapeShift; Original music by Kevin Shah, Jay Bocook, Josh Brickey & Lee Allman / Baby Shower by Benjamin Wallfisch / A Fateful Meeting by James Newton Howard / Leviathan by John Psathas / Hatching by Kris Bowers / Empire of Angels by Thomas Bergersen	90.800	9th place World Class; Finalist
2026	The Lost Boys; Nature Boy by eden ahbez / Scorching the Facade by Yuta Bandoh / Kidnapped & Galleon Dog Fight (from Pan) by John Powell / A Boy's Dream by Jay Bocook / Hollow by Syncatto / Original music by Jay Bocook, Kevin Shah, Josh Brickey & Lee Allman	92.175	8th place World Class; Finalist

== Caption awards ==
At the annual World Championship Finals, Drum Corps International (DCI) presents awards to the corps with the high average scores from prelims, semi-finals, and finals in five captions. The Cavaliers have won these caption awards:

Don Angelica Best General Effect Award/Formerly Known: High General Effect

- 1990 (tie), 1995, 2001, 2002, 2004, 2006

John Brazale Best Visual Performance Award/Formerly Known: High Visual

- 1991, 1992, 2000, 2002, 2004, 2006

George Zingali Best Color Guard Performance Award

- 2000, 2002, 2004, 2007

Jim Ott Best Brass Performance Award

- 2002, 2006

Fred Sanford Best Percussion Performance Award/Formerly Known: High Percussion

- 1991 (tie), 1992, 1995, 1999, 2000, 2011, 2023

== Bibliography ==
- Foutz, Colt (2007). Building the Green Machine: Don Warren and Sixty Years with the World Champion Cavaliers Drum and Bugle Corps. Casemate Publishers. ISBN 978-1-61121-030-9. OCLC 759858235.
