= The Very Best of Cilla Black =

The Very Best of Cilla Black may refer to:

- The Very Best of Cilla Black (2013 album)
- The Very Best of Cilla Black (1983 album)
