= Softly, as I Leave You =

Softly, as I Leave You may refer to:

- Softly, as I Leave You (song), a song composed by Giorgio Calabrese
- Softly, as I Leave You (album), an album by Frank Sinatra
