= The 1st of Sonny Curtis =

- The 1st of Sonny Curtis album cover

Studio album by Sonny Curtis
- Released: February 1968
- Genre: Rock and roll
- Length: 26:23
- Label: Viva V-36012
- Producer: Snuff Garrett

Sonny Curtis chronology
Beatle Hits Flamenco Guitar Style (1964)	The 1st of Sonny Curtis (1968)	The Sonny Curtis Style (1969)

Singles from The 1st of Sonny Curtis
- 1. "My Way Of Life b/w Last Call" Released: Aug 1966; 2. "Destiny's Child b/w The Collector" Released: Feb 1967; 3. "I Wanna Go Bummin' Around b/w I'm A Gypsy Man" Released: Aug 1967

The 1st of Sonny Curtis is a country pop album by the Crickets guitarist and songwriter Sonny Curtis recorded for Viva Records. It is Curtis's first album for Viva and second solo record, after an LP of Flamenco versions of Beatles songs he released in 1964. In addition to new original material, the album contains new versions of Sonny Curtis songs "A Fool Never Learns", "Walk Right Back", and "I Fought The Law (And The Law Won)". The album was originally released as a stereo LP record in late February 1968, the album has never been re-released on CD. There was also a mono release.

== Track listing ==
All tracks written by Sonny Curtis, except where noted.

Side one
No.	Title	Writer(s)	Length
1.	"I Wanna Go Bummin' Around"		2:02
2.	"My Way of Life"		2:24
3.	"Hung Up In Your Eyes"	Curtis, Glen D. Hardin	2:18
4.	"Day Drinker"		2:15
5.	"Where Will The Words Come From"	Curtis, Hardin	2:15
6.	"Destiny's Child"		2:03

Side two
No.	Title	Writer(s)	Length
7.	"I'm a Gypsy Man"		2:29
8.	"Holiday for Clowns"	Curtis, Hardin	2:29
9.	"A Fool Never Learns"	Curtis, Hardin	1:46
10.	"Walk Right Back"		2:15
11.	"Beggar's Blues"		1:56
12.	"I Fought The Law (And The Law Won)"		1:59

== Personnel ==
- Sonny Curtis - guitar, vocals
- Glen D. Hardin - piano
- Snuff Garrett - arranger
- Leon Russell - arranger
- Recorded Amigo Studios

== Cover versions ==
A number of artists have recorded versions of songs on the album, including:

- "I Wanna Go Bummin' Around" by Michael Shelley
- "Day Drinker" by Johnny Duncan
