= Surround Yourself with Cilla =

Studio album by Cilla Black
- Released: 23 May 1969
- Recorded: 1968/1969
- Studios: Abbey Road Studios, London
- Genres: Pop, Merseybeat, Soul
- Label: Parlophone/EMI
- Producer: George Martin

Cilla Black chronology
The Best of Cilla Black (1968)	Surround Yourself with Cilla (1969)	Sweet Inspiration (1970)

Singles from Surround Yourself with Cilla
- 1. "Surround Yourself with Sorrow" Released: February 1969

Surround Yourself with Cilla is Cilla Black's fourth solo studio album, released on 23 May 1969 by Parlophone Records. It was Cilla's first album to fail to make the UK charts.

The album title was inspired by the lead single "Surround Yourself with Sorrow" which had previously reached No. 3 on the UK Singles Chart. An Italian language version of this song "Quando Si Spezza Un Grande Amore", with Italian lyrics by Mogol, was also recorded for the Latin market, while a Swedish language version "Försök och sov på saken" was recorded by Anni-Frid Lyngstad prior to her international success with the group ABBA.

== Re-Release ==
On 7 September 2009, EMI Records released a special edition of the album exclusively to digital download. This re-issue features all of the album's original recordings re-mastered by Abbey Road Studios from original 1/4" stereo master tapes. A digital booklet containing original album artwork, detailed track information and rare photographs will be available from iTunes with purchases of the entire album re-issue.

== Track listing ==
Side one

1. "Aquarius" (Galt MacDermot, Gerome Ragni, Jim Rado)
2. "Without Him" (Harry Nilsson)
3. "Only Forever Will Do (Prigioniero del Mondo)" (Carlo Donida, Don Black, Giulio Rapetti)
4. "You'll Never Get to Heaven (If You Break My Heart)" (Burt Bacharach, Hal David)
5. "Forget Him" (Kenny Lynch, Mort Shuman)
6. "It'll Never Happen Again" (Tim Hardin)

Side two

1. "Think of Me (Siamo Qui)" (C. Fishman, Fred Bongusto)
2. "I Am a Woman" (Roger Cook, Roger Greenaway)
3. "Words" (Barry Gibb, Maurice Gibb, Robin Gibb)
4. "Red Rubber Ball" (Bruce Woodley, Paul Simon)
5. "Liverpool Lullaby" (Stan Kelly), arranged and conducted by Johnny Hawkins
6. "Surround Yourself with Sorrow" (Bill Martin, Phil Coulter)

== Credits ==
Personnel

- Lead Vocals by Cilla Black
- Produced by George Martin
- Album Cover Photograph by Francis Loney
