= Casey Claw =

Type of snare drum visual technique

The Casey Claw is a rudimental snare drum technique that is used as an impressive visual effect for a very short phrase of music. It was created by Mark Casey in 1990 while attending the University of Kentucky. The technique gives the impression that one stick is spinning very quickly while at the same time a rapid succession of notes is being played on the drum.

The actual rudiment is essentially a double stroke roll (with the sticking being "RRLLRRLLRRLL"), the difference being that the first note of every right hand double is played with the "butt" end of the drum stick and the very next note of the double is played with the tip of the drum stick. The technique is generally regarded as being rather difficult.

It was first performed in 1993 by Mark Casey in his solo at DCI. It was performed in the fall of 1993 by the University of Kentucky drum line at the PASIC indoor drum line competition as well as the Bands of America indoor drum line competition. The Cavaliers Drum and Bugle Corps performed it in 1994, 1995, and 2023. The corps won the Fred Sanford Award for Best Percussion Performance in 1995 and 2023.

== Technique summary ==
To play the Casey Claw, the right hand must use a different technique than the normal match grip technique. The stick is held with the right hand in the middle of the stick (as opposed to the normal playing position where the right hand grips the stick closer to the butt end). The right stick is also held in a fist, where all the fingers wrap around the stick and the thumb wraps around in the other direction, which differs from the match grip technique. The right hand is held straight out over the drum head, higher and further out than its usual playing position.

The right hand turns quickly in a repetitive, counter-clockwise motion, where the butt end hits first and the tip hits immediately after the butt on its way down. The left-handed doubles are placed in between the right hand doubles. The left hand technique does not need to change (traditional or match grip may be used for the left hand), although it is often useful to play the left hand further back from the center of the drum in order to leave room for the right hand. This prevents the right hand stick from hitting the left hand stick.

The Hulka Helicopter, by Scott "Hulka" McCoy (also a former marching member and drum sergeant of The Cavaliers), is a variation of the Casey Claw, where both the left and right hands use the Casey Claw technique.
