= Softly, as I Leave You (album) =

Studio album by Frank Sinatra
- Released: November 1964 (LP); February 1989 (CD)
- Recorded: August 27, 1962 – October 3, 1964, Los Angeles
- Genre: Traditional pop; vocal jazz
- Length: 33:33
- Label: Reprise; FS 1013
- Producer: Jimmy Bowen; Sonny Burke

Frank Sinatra chronology
12 Songs of Christmas (1964)	Softly, as I Leave You (1964)	Sinatra '65: The Singer Today (1965)

Singles from Softly, as I Leave You
- 1. "Softly, as I Leave You" Released: 1964

Professional ratings
Review scores
Source	Rating
AllMusic	3/5 stars

Softly, as I Leave You is a 1964 studio album by American singer Frank Sinatra. Arranged by Ernie Freeman, several tracks such as "Softly, as I Leave You", "Then Suddenly Love" and "Available" departed from Sinatra's signature vocal jazz style by flirting with a more contemporary pop sound. The rest of the album is pieced together with leftovers from various early 1960s sessions, from many different arrangers and conductors.

The title track was the first of at least four attempts to mimic the chart success of Dean Martin's number 1 hit "Everybody Loves Somebody", using a driving beat, heavy strings and choral tracks. Sinatra, arranger Ernie Freeman and producer Jimmy Bowen would incorporate the same sound to songs like "When Somebody Loves You", "Tell Her You Love Her (Each Day)" and "Somewhere in Your Heart" with only minor chart success.

== Track listing ==
1. "Emily" (Johnny Mandel, Johnny Mercer) – 2:58
2. "Here's to the Losers" (Robert Wells, Jack Segal) – 3:05
3. "Dear Heart" (Jay Livingston, Ray Evans, Henry Mancini) – 2:43
4. "Come Blow Your Horn" (Sammy Cahn, Jimmy Van Heusen) – 3:07
5. "Love Isn't Just for the Young" (Bernard Knee, Herb Miller) – 2:57
6. "I Can't Believe I'm Losing You" (Don Costa, Phil Zeller) – 2:43
7. "Pass Me By" (Cy Coleman, Carolyn Leigh) – 2:25
8. "Softly, as I Leave You" (Hal Shaper, Antonio DeVita, Giorgio Calabrese) – 2:50
9. "Then Suddenly Love" (Roy Alfred, Paul Vance) – 2:15
10. "Available" (Cahn, Ned Wynn, L.B. Marks) – 2:47
11. "Talk to Me Baby" (Robert Emmett Dolan, Mercer) – 3:00
12. "The Look of Love" (Cahn, Van Heusen) – 2:43

Notes

- Tracks 1, 3 and 7 recorded on October 3, 1964
- Tracks 8, 9 and 10 recorded on July 17, 1964
- Uncredited background singers perform on tracks 1, 3 and 7–10
- The Orchestra on tracks 1, 3 and 6–7 includes 9 Violins
- Tracks 2 and 5 recorded on July 31, 1963
- The Orchestra on Tracks 2, 5 and 8–10 includes 12 Violins
- "Come Blow Your Horn" recorded on January 21, 1963
- Jimmy Van Heusen is also known as James Van Heusen
- The Orchestra on Tracks 4 and 12 includes 10 Violins
- "I Can't Believe I'm Losing You" recorded on April 8, 1964
- Tracks 8–10 recorded on July 17, 1964
- "Talk to Me Baby" recorded on December 3, 1963
- The Orchestra on "Talk to Me Baby" includes 14 Violins
- Robert Emmett Dolan is also known as Robert Dolan
- "The Look of Love" recorded on August 27, 1962

== Personnel ==
- Frank Sinatra - vocals (2, 4–6, 11–12, lead on 1, 3, 7–10)
- Don Costa - arranger (6, 11), conductor (11)
- Ernie Freeman - arranger, conductor (8–10)
- Neal Hefti - conductor (12)
- Billy May - arranger (7)
- Marty Paich - arranger, conductor (2, 5)
- Nelson Riddle - arranger (1, 3–4, 6, 12), conductor (1, 3–4, 6–7)

== Charts ==
Chart (1964)	Peak position
UK Albums (OCC)	20
US Billboard 200	19
