= The Very Best of Cilla Black (2013 album) =

Compilation album by Cilla Black
- Released: 14 October 2013
- Recorded: 1963–2003
- Genre: Pop
- Length: 77:21 (CD)
- Label: Parlophone (Warner Music Group)
- Producer: George Martin, David Mackay, Ted Carfrae

Cilla Black chronology
Completely Cilla (2012)	The Very Best of Cilla Black (2013)	Hit Singles (2015)

The Very Best of Cilla Black is a career-spanning compilation album by English singer Cilla Black, released in October 2013 by Parlophone / Warner Music Group UK to mark her golden anniversary in show business. The album reached No. 37 in 2013 on the UK Albums Chart, which was Black's first Top 40 hit in thirty years. In September 2014, after the transmission of ITV biopic Cilla starring Sheridan Smith the album re-entered the UK Albums Chart and peaked at No. 26. The album was to make its ultimate peak at No. 1 after Black's death in August 2015, becoming her first number-one album. It also reached No. 1 in New Zealand on 21 August 2015 and stayed there for five consecutive weeks, making it the first album to achieve this since Sol3 Mio's eponymous album in March 2014.

== Overview ==
The 2013 release is a two disc set—one CD and one DVD: the CD album includes all 19 of Black's UK Top 40 singles alongside fan favourites and recently commissioned dance remixes of Cilla classics; the bonus region-free PAL DVD contains the 1966 TV special Cilla at the Savoy.

The compilation was repackaged on 20 November 2015 with a special Gold foil 'Cilla' cover featuring an extended 16-page picture booklet and tribute from Cilla's son Robert Willis, who served as the executive producer of the album. A single CD edition was also released in November 2015 by Warner Music Australia.

== Track listing ==
=== Disc one (CD) ===
1. "Love of the Loved" – 2:03
2. "Anyone Who Had a Heart" – 2:49
3. "You're My World" – 2:58
4. "It's for You" – 2:22
5. "You've Lost That Lovin' Feelin'" – 3:09
6. "I've Been Wrong Before" – 2:11
7. "Love's Just a Broken Heart" – 2:29
8. "Alfie" – 2:38
9. "Sing a Rainbow" – 2:45
10. "Don't Answer Me" – 2:47
11. "A Fool Am I" – 2:50
12. "What Good Am I?" – 3:09
13. "I Only Live to Love You" – 2:47
14. "Step Inside Love" – 2:23
15. "Where Is Tomorrow?" – 2:42
16. "Liverpool Lullaby" – 3:16
17. "Surround Yourself with Sorrow" – 2:34
18. "Conversations" – 4:10
19. "If I Thought You'd Ever Change Your Mind" – 2:50
20. "Your Song" – 3:55
21. "Something Tells Me (Something's Gonna Happen Tonight)" – 2:27
22. "I Don't Know How to Love Him" – 4:08
23. "Baby We Can't Go Wrong" – 3:04
24. "When You Walk in the Room" – 2:51
25. "Imagine" (Matt Pop Remix – Radio Edit) – 4:22
26. "Faded Images" (Almighty Remix – Radio Edit) – 3:42

=== Disc two (DVD) ===
1. Overture: "Let Me Entertain You"
2. "By Myself/Tonight/Let There Be Love" (Medley)
3. Interlude: Peter Gordeno Dances to "Sweet Georgia Brown"
4. "What's a Nice Kid Like You Doing in a Place Like This?"
5. "If I Had a Hammer"
6. "Pick Up a Cane" (with Peter Gordeno)
7. "Yesterday"
8. "Anyone Who Had a Heart"
9. "September in the Rain"
10. "Sing a Rainbow"
11. "Alfie"
12. "You're My World"

== Credits ==
Personnel

- Lead vocals by Cilla Black

== Charts ==
=== Weekly charts ===
Chart (2015)	Peak position
Australian Albums (ARIA)	50
Irish Albums (IRMA)	25
New Zealand Albums (RMNZ)	1
UK Albums (OCC)	1

=== Year-end charts ===
Chart (2015)	Position
New Zealand Albums (RMNZ)	9
UK Albums (OCC)	25

== Certifications ==
Region	Certification	Certified units/sales
New Zealand (RMNZ)	Platinum	15,000^{^}
United Kingdom (BPI)	Platinum	300,000^{‡}
^{^} Shipments figures based on certification alone.^{‡} Sales+streaming figures based on certification alone.
