= The Very Best of Cilla Black (1983 album) =

Compilation album by Cilla Black
- Released: January 1983
- Recorded: 1963–1974
- Genre: Pop, adult contemporary
- Label: EMI Records; EMTV 38
- Producer: George Martin, David Mackay

Cilla Black chronology
The Best of Cilla Black (1968)	The Very Best of Cilla Black (1983)	Love, Cilla (1993)

The Very Best of Cilla Black was a TV advertised compilation album by English singer Cilla Black, originally released in 1983 by EMI Records UK on vinyl LP and Cassette to mark her 20th anniversary in show business. The album reached No. 20 on the UK Albums Chart in 1983. The album was certified Silver by the BPI on 28 January 1983. The album was later re-issued on EMI's budget label Music for Pleasure.

== Track listing ==
Side 1

1. "Love of the Loved"
2. "Anyone Who Had a Heart"
3. "You're My World"
4. "It's for You"
5. "You've Lost That Lovin' Feelin'"
6. "I've Been Wrong Before"
7. "Love's Just a Broken Heart"
8. "Alfie"
9. "Don't Answer Me"
10. "A Fool Am I"

Side 2

1. "What Good Am I?"
2. "I Only Live to Love You"
3. "Step Inside Love"
4. "Where Is Tomorrow?"
5. "Surround Yourself with Sorrow"
6. "Conversations"
7. "If I Thought You'd Ever Change Your Mind"
8. "Something Tells Me (Something's Gonna Happen Tonight)"
9. "Baby We Can't Go Wrong"
10. "Liverpool Lullaby"

== Credits ==
Personnel

- Lead vocals by Cilla Black

== Charts ==
Chart (1983)	Peak position
Australian Albums (ARIA)	51
UK Albums (OCC)	20

== Certifications ==
Region	Certification	Certified units/sales
United Kingdom (BPI)	Silver	60,000^{^}
^{^} Shipments figures based on certification alone.
