= Cilla Sings a Rainbow =

Studio album by Cilla Black
- Released: 18 April 1966
- Recorded: 1965–1966
- Studio: EMI Studios, London
- Genre: Pop, merseybeat, soul
- Label: Parlophone/EMI
- Producer: George Martin

Cilla Black chronology
Cilla (1965)	Cilla Sings a Rainbow (1966)	Sher-oo! (1968)

Singles from Cilla Sings a Rainbow
- 1. "Love's Just a Broken Heart" Released: January 1966

Professional ratings
Review scores
Source	Rating
AllMusic	3/5 stars
Record Mirror	3/5 stars

Cilla Sings a Rainbow is Cilla Black's second solo studio album, released on 18 April 1966 by Parlophone Records. The album reached No. 4 on the UK Albums Chart, surpassing the No. 5 peak of her previous album and becoming her highest charting studio album.

== Re-release ==
A mono sound edition of this album was re-issued on CD in 2002 by EMI Records with Cilla.

On 7 September 2009, EMI Records release a special edition of the album exclusively to digital download. This re-issue features all of the album's original recordings re-mastered by Abbey Road Studios from original 1/4" stereo master tapes. A digital booklet containing original album artwork, detailed track information and rare photographs will be available from iTunes with purchases of the entire album re-issue.

== Track listing ==
Side one

1. "Love's Just a Broken Heart (L’amour est ce qu’il est)" (Mort Shuman, Kenny Lynch, Michele Vendome)
2. "A Lover's Concerto" (Sandy Linzer, Denny Randell)
3. "Make it Easy on Yourself" (Burt Bacharach, Hal David)
4. "One, Two, Three" (John Madara, David White, Leonard Borisoff)
5. "(There's) No Place to Hide" (Roger Atkins, Helen Miller)
6. "When I Fall in Love" (Victor Young, Edward Heyman)
7. "Yesterday" (Lennon–McCartney)

Side two

1. "Sing a Rainbow" (Arthur Hamilton)
2. "Baby I'm Yours" (Van McCoy)
3. "The Real Thing" (Joshie Armstead, Nickolas Ashford, Valerie Simpson)
4. "Everything I Touch Turns to Tears" (Gary Geld, Peter Udell)
5. "In a Woman's Eyes" (Bobby Russell, Martha Sharp)
6. "My Love Come Home" (Gene Colonnello, Conrad, Mario Panzeri)

== Personnel ==
- Cilla Black - lead vocals
- George Martin - producer
- David Wharin - sleeve design
- Robert Whitaker - cover photography

Accompaniment

- John Scott (tracks A5, A6, B2), Johnny Pearson (track B6), Mort Shuman (track A1), Nicky Welsh (tracks A2-4, A7, B1, B3-5)

== Chart positions ==
Chart (1966)	Peak position
UK Albums Chart	4
