= Ebony Eyes (John D. Loudermilk song) =

Single by The Everly Brothers
- B-side: "Walk Right Back"
- Released: January 1961
- Recorded: November 1, 1960
- Length: 2:54
- Label: Warner Bros.
- Songwriter: John D. Loudermilk

The Everly Brothers singles chronology
"So Sad (To Watch Good Love Go Bad)" (1960)	"Ebony Eyes" (1961)	"Temptation" (1961)

"Ebony Eyes" is a song written by John D. Loudermilk, recorded in 1960 by The Everly Brothers, and released as a single in 1961 together with "Walk Right Back", which reached No. 8 on the U.S. Billboard Hot 100.

The lyrics tell a young man's tragic story of losing his beloved fiancée in an airplane crash in dark, stormy weather conditions, which remind him of his fiancée's "ebony eyes". Thematically, it was part of a wave of teenage tragedy hit songs during the late 1950s and 1960s.

The single, a double A-side in the UK, reached No.1 in the UK Singles Chart on 2 March 1961 for 3 weeks and was the ninth best-selling single of the calendar year 1961 in the U.K. "Ebony Eyes" was initially banned by the BBC from airplay in the U.K. as its lyrics were considered too upsetting to play on the radio.
