= Cilla (album) =

Studio album by Cilla Black
- Released: 25 January 1965
- Recorded: 1964
- Genres: Pop; Merseybeat; soul
- Label: Parlophone
- Producer: George Martin

Cilla Black chronology
Cilla (1965)	Cilla Sings a Rainbow (1966)

Professional ratings
Review scores
Source	Rating
AllMusic	3/5 stars

Cilla is the debut studio album by British singer Cilla Black, released on 25 January 1965 by Parlophone Records. The album was a commercial success, reaching No. 5 on the UK Albums Chart. The tracks were directed by John Scott, Johnnie Spence and George Martin. Sounds Incorporated accompany her on "Love Letters".

== Re-release ==
A mono sound edition of this album was re-issued on CD in 2002 by EMI Records with Cilla Sings a Rainbow.

On 7 September 2009, EMI released a special edition of the album exclusively to digital download. This re-issue features all of the album's original recordings and four bonus tracks, re-mastered by Abbey Road Studios from original 1/4" stereo master tapes. A digital booklet containing original album artwork, detailed track information and rare photographs will be available from iTunes with purchases of the entire album re-issue.

== Track listing ==
Side one
No.	Title	Writer(s)	Length
1.	"Goin' Out of My Head"	Teddy Randazzo, Robert Weinstein	2:14
2.	"Every Little Bit Hurts"	Ed Cobb	2:36
3.	"Baby It's You"	Burt Bacharach, Mack David, Barney Williams	2:46
4.	"Dancing in the Street"	Ivy Jo Hunter, William Stevenson, Marvin Gaye	2:26
5.	"Come to Me"	George Martin, Bobby Willis	2:35
6.	"Ol' Man River"	Jerome Kern, Oscar Hammerstein II	2:30

Side two
No.	Title	Writer(s)	Length
1.	"One Little Voice (Uno Di Voi)"	Mario Fu Luigi Coppola, Anelio Elio Isola, Hal Shaper	3:04
2.	"I'm Not Alone Anymore"	Clive Westlake, Kenny Lynch	2:22
3.	"Whatcha Gonna Do 'Bout It"	Doris Troy, Gregory Carroll	2:32
4.	"Love Letters"	Edward Heyman, Victor Young	3:15
5.	"This Empty Place"	Hal David, Burt Bacharach	2:41
6.	"You'd Be So Nice to Come Home To"	Cole Porter	2:22

2009 Digital download bonus tracks
No.	Title	Writer(s)	Length
13.	"A Shot of Rhythm and Blues" (take 2)	Terry Thompson	1:58
14.	"You're My World (Il Mio Mondo)" (alternate take)	Umberto Bindi, Gino Paoli, Carl Sigman	2:57
15.	"(Love Is Like a) Heat Wave"	Lamont Dozier, Brian Holland, Edward Holland, Jr.	2:08
16.	"Some Things You Never Get Used To"	Van McCoy	2:52

== Personnel ==
- Lead vocals by Cilla Black
- Produced by George Martin
- Album cover photograph by Roger Whitaker

== Charts ==
Chart (1965)	Peak position
UK Albums Chart	5
