= Sonny Curtis =

American singer and songwriter (1937–2025)

Background information
- Born: May 9, 1937; Meadow, Texas, U.S.
- Died: September 19, 2025 (aged 88) Nashville, Tennessee, U.S.
- Genres: Rock and roll; country; pop
- Occupation: Singer-songwriter
- Instruments: Guitar; vocals
- Years active: 1955–2025
- Label: Viva
- Formerly of: The Crickets
- Spouse: Louise Halverson (m. 1970)

Sonny Curtis (May 9, 1937 – September 19, 2025) was an American singer and songwriter. Known for his collaborations with Buddy Holly, he was a member of the Crickets and continued with the band after Holly's death in 1959. He is a member of three music Halls of Fame including the Rock and Roll Hall of Fame.

Curtis's best known compositions include "Walk Right Back", a major hit in 1961 for the Everly Brothers; "I Fought the Law", notably covered by the Bobby Fuller Four, the Clash, and Green Day; "Love is All Around", the theme song for The Mary Tyler Moore Show; "More Than I Can Say", co-written with The Crickets' drummer Jerry Allison and a hit for Leo Sayer in 1980, and "I'm No Stranger to the Rain", a No. 1 Country hit for Keith Whitley in 1989.

== Life and career ==
Curtis was born in Meadow, Texas, United States on May 9, 1937. His parents were cotton farmers, Sonny Curtis was their sixth and last child. His roots were in bluegrass music, he learned the guitar at a young age from his uncles, Smokey, Herb and Edd Mayfield, who had their own bluegrass band, The Mayfield Brothers. Curtis' own first band was drawn from his two older brothers and was bluegrass in style.

As a guitarist, he played on some of Buddy Holly's earlier 1956 Decca sessions, including the minor hit "Blue Days Black Nights" and a song he wrote, "Rock Around With Ollie Vee". In 1955 and 1956 he, along with Buddy Holly, opened concerts for rising new star Elvis Presley. Although he had gone on the road with other musicians by the time Buddy Holly put together the Crickets in 1957, Curtis joined the Crickets in late 1958, shortly before Holly's death in 1959, and soon took over the lead vocalist role in addition to lead guitar. The Crickets' post-Holly recordings were put on hold after Holly's death, and Curtis was drafted in late 1959. During basic training, he was given a three-day pass and met the Crickets' drummer, Jerry Allison, who was then playing with the Everly Brothers, in Los Angeles. Curtis played him the song "Walk Right Back", which Allison had him immediately take to the Everlys; they recorded the song that weekend and were later rewarded with a Billboard top 10 hit.

In late 1960, the Crickets' album In Style with the Crickets was finally released, including the original versions of two of Curtis's best known compositions, "I Fought the Law" and "More Than I Can Say" (co-written with Allison and a UK No. 4 hit by Bobby Vee and a US No. 2 hit by Leo Sayer). Along with Allison, he participated in Eddie Cochran's last recording sessions, including the song "Three Steps to Heaven." In 1964, he released the single "A Beatle I Want to Be" in response to Beatlemania. He continued to record and perform intermittently as part of the band over six decades, most recently in their album The Crickets and their Buddies (2004), where they reprised most of their hits with help from many noted fellow musicians. Curtis left the Crickets several times to pursue his solo career, but even during those periods made occasional guest appearances, in performance and on record, with the Crickets. His last recording with the Crickets was their 2004 penultimate album The Crickets & Their Buddies. His song "The Real Buddy Holly Story" was written in response to the inaccuracies in the 1978 movie The Buddy Holly Story.

"I Fought the Law" was later covered in the studio or in concert by many artists, including the Bobby Fuller Four, the Clash, Dead Kennedys, Bryan Adams, John Cougar Mellencamp, Bruce Springsteen, Roy Orbison, Tom Petty, Social Distortion, Mike Ness, Hank Williams Jr., Waylon Jennings, Nitty Gritty Dirt Band, Green Day, Ramones, Grateful Dead, Stray Cats, Mary's Danish, Mano Negra, Big Dirty Band, Lolita No.18, the Brian Jonestown Massacre, Attaque 77, Die Toten Hosen, Status Quo, Nanci Griffith, and the Men They Couldn't Hang. A less conventional cover version was recorded by the Irish actor Colin Farrell, used during the end credits of the 2003 film Intermission. Curtis did not greatly benefit from his own performance of "I Fought the Law" but he could at least enjoy the royalties rolling in. He said it only took him 15 minutes to write: "It's my most important copyright."

Later, Curtis wrote the theme song of The Mary Tyler Moore Show, "Love Is All Around", which he also recorded for the show. The song was covered by Hüsker Dü in 1985, and by Joan Jett in 1996. Curtis also co-wrote the 1989 Country Song of the Year, "I'm No Stranger to the Rain", recorded by Keith Whitley. Other songs Curtis wrote include "The Straight Life" (recorded by Glen Campbell, and later by Bobby Goldsboro) and "A Fool Never Learns" (recorded by Andy Williams). Anne Murray also recorded the Sonny Curtis songs "I Like Your Music" and "You Made My Life a Song" on her 1972 LP Annie.

In 1991, Sonny Curtis was inducted into the Nashville Songwriters Hall of Fame. In 2007, Curtis was inducted into the Musicians Hall of Fame and Museum in Nashville, Tennessee, as a member of the Crickets. In 2012, Curtis was inducted into the Rock and Roll Hall of Fame as a member of the Crickets (along with Allison, bassist Joe B. Mauldin, and rhythm guitarist Niki Sullivan) by a special committee, to make amends for the Crickets having been rebuffed and not included with Buddy Holly when Holly was first inducted in 1986.

On February 6, 2016, Curtis performed at the Crickets' farewell concert at the Surf Lake Ballroom in Clear Lake, Iowa, the venue of Holly's last performance before his death.

== Personal life and death ==
Curtis married Louise Halverson in 1970; the couple had a daughter, Sarah, and lived on a Tennessee cattle farm. Sarah Curtis published a memoir about the relationship with her "loving but cryptic" father, Daughter of a Song, in September 2025.

Curtis died from pneumonia at a hospital in Nashville, Tennessee, on September 19, 2025, at the age of 88.

== Discography ==
=== Albums ===
Year	Album	US Country	Label
1964	Beatle Hits Flamenco Guitar Style	—	El Records
1968	The 1st of Sonny Curtis	21	Viva
1969	The Sonny Curtis Style	—	Elektra
1979	Sonny Curtis	—	Elektra
1980	Love Is All Around	—	Elektra
1981	Rollin'	—	Elektra
1987	Spectrum	—	Nightlite
1990	No Stranger To The Rain	—	Ritz Records
2007	Sonny Curtis	—	

=== Singles ===
Year	Single	Chart Positions			Album
Year	Single	US Country	US	Canada Country	Album
1964	"A Beatle I Want to Be" b/w "A Pretty Girl"	—	—	—	
1966	"My Way of Life" b/w "Last Call"	49	134	—	The 1st of Sonny Curtis
1966	"Destiny's Child" b/w "The Collector"	—	—	—	The 1st of Sonny Curtis
1967	"I Wanna Go Bummin' Around" b/w "I'm a Gypsy Man"	50	—	—	The 1st of Sonny Curtis
1968	"Atlanta Georgia Stray" b/w "Day Drinker"	36	120	—	The Sonny Curtis Style
1968	"The Straight Life" b/w "How Little Men Care"	45	—	—	The Sonny Curtis Style
1970	"Love Is All Around" b/w "Here, There and Everywhere"	—	—	—	single only
1971	"Day Gig" b/w "Holiday for Clowns"	—	—	—	The Sonny Curtis Style
1971	"Hung Up in Your Eyes" b/w "Girl of the North"	—	—	—	The Sonny Curtis Style
1972	"Lights of L.A." b/w "Sunny Mornin'"	—	—	—	singles only
1973	"Rock'n Roll (I Gave You the Best Years of My Life)" b/w "My Momma Sure Left Me Some Good Old Days"	—	—	—	singles only
1974	"Unsaintly Judy" b/w "You Don't Belong in This Place"	—	—	—	singles only
1975	"Lovesick Blues" b/w "It's Only a Question of Time"	78	—	—	singles only
1976	"Where's Patricia Now" b/w "It's Only a Question of Time"	—	—	—	singles only
1976	"Where's Patricia Now" b/w "When It's Just You and Me"	—	—	—	singles only
1979	"The Cowboy Singer" b/w "Cheatin' Clouds"	77	—	—	Sonny Curtis
1980	"Do You Remember Roll Over Beethoven" b/w "Walk Right Back"	86	—	—	Sonny Curtis
1980	"The Real Buddy Holly Story" b/w "Ain't Nobody Honest"	38	—	20	Love Is All Around
1980	"Love Is All Around" b/w "The Clone Song"	29	—	—	Love Is All Around
1980	"You Made My Life a Song" b/w "50 Ways to Leave Your Lover"	70	—	—	Love Is All Around
1981	"Good Ol' Girls" b/w "So Used to Loving You"	15	—	—	Rollin'
1981	"Married Women" b/w "I Live Your Music"	33	—	—	Rollin'
1985	"I Think I'm in Love" b/w "There's a Whole Lot Less to Me Than Meets the Eye"	—	—	—	singles only
1986	"Now I've Got a Heart of Gold"	69	—	—	singles only
