= Passing Strangers (1957 song) =

Song recorded by Billy Eckstine and Sarah Vaughan

"Passing Strangers" is a popular song, written in 1957 by Mel Mitchell, Stanley Applebaum and Rita Mann. At times it is mis-credited to Barry Mann and Sidney Mitchell.

The song was recorded that year as a duet by Billy Eckstine and Sarah Vaughan, and gave them a minor hit in the United States, where the song reached No. 82 on the Billboard charts. However, it enjoyed greater success in the United Kingdom, where, after initially being released in 1957 and spending two weeks in the UK Singles Chart, it was re-issued in 1969. On this occasion, it spent 15 weeks in the chart and peaked at No. 20.
