= Walk Right Back =

Single by The Everly Brothers

from the album The Golden Hits of The Everly Brothers
- A-side: "Ebony Eyes"
- Released: 1961
- Genre: Rock and roll
- Length: 2:18
- Label: Warner Bros.
- Songwriter: Sonny Curtis
- Producer: Wesley Rose

The Everly Brothers singles chronology
"Ebony Eyes" (1961)	"Walk Right Back" (1961)	"Temptation" (1961)

"Walk Right Back" is a 1961 song by Sonny Curtis that was recorded by The Everly Brothers, and went to No. 7 on the U.S. Billboard Hot 100 chart, and No. 1 on the UK Singles Chart for four weeks. Originally it was the B-side, then it was changed to the A-side.

In an interview he did with Jim Liddane of the International Songwriters Association, Sonny Curtis said about the song:

Well, I wrote most of that one Sunday afternoon, while I was doing my basic training in California, just after I went in the army, although I had the guitar riff for a while, and then, Lady Luck stepped in. I never was much for guns, and still am not really into them, but out of 250 men in our unit in basic training, six of us fired expert, and I was one of the six!

Anyway, for firing expert, they gave me a three-day pass, and I went straight down to Hollywood, and the Crickets were there, and so were Don and Phil, who were doing some acting classes for movies – they had just signed for Warner Brothers. So, J.I. (Jerry Allison of the Crickets) told me to sing the song for Don – actually I had only one verse written – and Don called Phil down, and they worked out a gorgeous harmony part. So, they said, 'If you write another verse. we'll record it'.

Anyway, I went back to base, and wrote a second verse, and put it in the mail to them, and next morning, I got a letter from J.I. to tell me that the Everlys had already recorded the song before they got my letter – they had simply recorded the first verse twice! And that's the version that was released, and that's the version that was the hit!

The joke is that Perry Como and Andy Williams and a whole bunch of others including myself, recorded the song with the second verse included, but when Anne Murray did it in 1978, she just did the same as the Everlys, just the one verse – and that was a big hit all over again – so maybe the second verse was never meant to be!

(It goes:

These eyes of mine that gave you loving glances once before, change to shades of cloudy gray. I want so very much to see you, just like before. I've got to know you're coming back to stay. Please believe me when I say, 'It's great to hear from you,' but there's a lot of things a letter just can't say, oh, me. Walk right back to me this minute ...,

etc.)

== Other versions ==
- Bobby Vee and The Ventures - for the album Bobby Vee Meets The Ventures (1963)
- The Move - at a BBC session (13 November 1969)
- Harry Nilsson - on a BBC TV special The Music of Nilsson (1971), sung in counterpoint with "Cathy's Clown."
- Andy Williams - for his album Solitaire (1973)
- Perry Como - a single release which reached No. 33 on the UK charts and No. 19 on the Irish Singles Charts in 1973.
- Val Doonican - for the album Some of My Best Friends Are Songs (1977).
- Mud recorded the song for their Rock On album in 1978.
- In 1978, the song was a No. 4 US Country hit (No. 3 US AC and No. 2 Canada Country) for Anne Murray. Murray also performed a version of her song on The Muppet Show.
- Daniel O'Donnell and Mary Duff - for their album Timeless (1996)
- Brenda Holloway - for her album It's a Woman's World (1999)

== Charts ==
The Everly Brothers

Chart (1961)	Peak position
Australia	8
Canada (CHUM)	3
New Zealand (Lever Hit Parade)	1
Norway (VG-lista)	10
UK Singles (Official Charts)	1
US Billboard Hot 100	7

Anne Murray

Chart (1978)	Peak position
Canada RPM Top Singles	32
Canada RPM Adult Contemporary	3
Canada Country	2
US Billboard Hot 100	103
US Billboard Adult Contemporary	3
US Billboard Country	4
