= Softly, as I Leave You (song) =

Translated song; English version of Italian song "Piano", adapted by Hal Shaper

"Piano"

Song
- Language: Italian
- English title: Softly, as I Leave You
- Composer: Tony De Vita (music)
- Lyricists: Giorgio Calabrese (Italian lyrics); Hal Shaper (English lyrics)

"Softly, as I Leave You"

Single by Matt Monro
- B-side: "Is There Anything I Can Do"
- Released: 1962
- Genre: Traditional pop
- Length: 3:25
- Label: Parlophone
- Songwriters: Giorgio Calabrese, Hal Shaper, Tony De Vita

Matt Monro singles chronology
"Gonna Build a Mountain" (1961)	"Softly, as I Leave You" (1962)	"When Love Comes Along" (1962)

"Softly, as I Leave You"

Single by Frank Sinatra

from the album Softly, as I Leave You
- B-side: "Then Suddenly Love"
- Released: 1964
- Genre: Traditional pop
- Length: 2:50
- Label: Reprise
- Songwriters: Giorgio Calabrese, Hal Shaper, Tony De Vita

Frank Sinatra singles chronology
"My Kind of Town" (1964)	"Softly, as I Leave You" (1964)	"I Heard the Bells on Christmas Day" (1964)

"Softly, as I Leave You" is a popular Italian song, originally titled Piano, composed by Tony De Vita with Italian lyrics by Giorgio Calabrese, and English lyrics by Hal Shaper. Notable English versions were recorded by Frank Sinatra and Matt Monro

== Background ==
It was originally an Italian success by Mina, entitled "Piano" ("Softly"). Mina published a recording of the song first as a single in 1960 and later on an EP and on three LPs. English songwriter Hal Shaper noticed the song and in November 1961 wrote English lyrics to the melody, calling it "Softly, as I Leave You".

When he performed the song live in Las Vegas, Elvis Presley prefaced with a story about the origins of the song. Presley said the song originated when a man was dying and his wife was sitting by his bedside. As she began to doze off, he felt himself beginning to die and he wrote the words to the song on a notepad. However, Presley insiders claim that his explanation for the song was merely an example of Presley's flair for storytelling, so his explanation is most likely apocryphal. Presley said he heard the story "from some people in Florida." Elvis doesn't actually sing this song; he speaks the words while his backing tenor Sherrill Nielsen sings it. While several recordings were made of Presley's interpretation of the song, the most famous was one recorded at the Las Vegas Hilton on 13 December 1975. RCA would release it posthumously in March of 1978 and it appears on the boxed set Walk A Mile In My Shoes: The Essential 70's Masters.

== Cover versions ==
- Matt Monro (1962) Parlophone 45 R 4868, whose single peaked at #10 in UK Singles Chart. Also included on the 1965 album, Hits Of Yesterday.
- Andy Williams on The Wonderful World of Andy Williams (1964)
- Bobby Darin on Venice Blue (1965)
- The Boston Pops Orchestra under the direction of John Williams on their 1993 album Boston Pops: Night and Day – Celebrate Sinatra.
- Cliff Richard with the London Philharmonic Orchestra on Richard's 1983 live album Dressed for the Occasion.
- David Whitfield did a cover of the song on New Zealand TV (1973).
- Doris Day on Love Him (1963)
- Elvis Presley would cover the song in concerts several times near the end of his life, with a recording from a Las Vegas show on December 13, 1975 released posthumously as the B-Side to his version of "Unchained Melody" in 1978.
- Eydie Gormé reached No. 30 on the US Easy Listening chart in 1967 with her version.
- Frank Sinatra on his 1964 album Softly, as I Leave You. This version went to No. 27 on the Billboard Hot 100 and No. 4 on the Easy Listening chart in 1964). The Sinatra family announced Frank's death on May 14, 1998, by placing an announcement on their website that was accompanied by a recording of the singer's version of the song.
- The Fleetwoods on their 1964 album Before and After.
- The Lettermen on their 1964 album She Cried
- Robert Goulet on My Love Forgive Me (1964)
- Shirley Bassey for her 1968 album This is My Life
- Lena Horne on her 1965 album Feelin' Good
- Johnny Rivers on his 1966 album Changes, (which also features his version of "Poor Side of Town")
- Shirley Horn on her 1987 album Softly
- Patti LaBelle on her 2017 album Bel Hommage
