= A Fool Never Learns =

- Dutch release picture sleeve

Single by Andy Williams
- A-side: "Charade"
- Released: 24 December 1963
- Genre: Easy Listening
- Length: 2:01
- Label: Columbia Records 42950
- Songwriter: Sonny Curtis
- Producer: Robert Mersey

Andy Williams singles chronology
"Under Paris Skies" (1964)	"A Fool Never Learns" (1963)	"Charade" (1964)

"A Fool Never Learns" is a song written by Sonny Curtis and performed by Andy Williams. The song reached #4 on the U.S. adult contemporary chart, #13 on the Billboard chart, and #40 in the UK in 1964. The song's A-side, "Charade", reached #100 on the Billboard Hot 100.

== Chart performance ==
Chart (1963–64)	Peak position
UK Singles (The Official Charts Company)	40
US Billboard Easy Listening	4
US Billboard Hot 100	13
