= Hal Shaper =

South African musician (1931–2004)

- Born: Harold David Shaper; July 18, 1931; Muizenberg, Cape Town, South Africa
- Died: January 8, 2004 (aged 72) Cape Town, South Africa
- Genres: Pop; film music
- Occupation: Lyricist
- Years active: 1951–2004
- Labels: Sparta Music

Harold David Shaper (18 July 1931 – 8 January 2004), known as Hal Shaper, was a South African songwriter. After qualifying as a lawyer in 1955, he travelled to London to begin his five-decade-long musical career during which he worked with and wrote for well-known artists including Frank Sinatra, Elvis Presley, Barbra Streisand and David Bowie. After establishing financial stability following the release of his first hit Softly, As I Leave You, he began his own music publishing company, Sparta Florida Inc.. Aside from song titles and lyrics, Shaper also wrote for films as well as musicals.

== Biography ==
Shaper was born on 18 July 1931 in Muizenberg near Cape Town as the third and youngest child of Jewish parents. His father was from Manchester and his mother from the ghetto of Lodz in Poland. He was inspired to become a songwriter after seeing the Mickey Rooney film Words and Music (1948), saying: he was "enchanted by the quality of the songs and the freshness of them" In 1949 Hal met young pianist and budding songwriter, Charles Segal who was holidaying in Muizenberg. Charles encouraged Hal to write his first lyrics for one of Charles's songs - "I Never Loved Before", beginning a musical collaboration and friendship that spanned many decades. Young Charles introduced young Hal to one of Charles's well-established lyricists, Anton De Waal. Encouraged by his friend, Charles Segal, Hal gained confidence and other songs soon followed (I Got Troubles of My Own", "I'll Never Dream Again", "Tanganyika" and many others). Hal's initial attempts at musical theatre were performed in local theatres; his professional songwriting career did not begin until later. In 1955, Shaper was certified as a lawyer in Cape Town. However, he did not pursue a career in law but rather left immediately for London in seek of a songwriting career.

In London, he first earned a living washing dishes with the Troubadour restaurant in Earls Court. In the summer of 1955, he was employed as a song plugger by pop music publisher Dave Toff of Southern Music, who, Shaper said, discouraged him from writing lyrics, stating "there was no future in the business for writers". Shaper was then persuaded to move to Robbins Music by Alan Holmes, leaving his job as a plugger in August 1958. In Robbins Music, a higher quality acclaimed label, he began writing songs under the mentorship of Alan Holmes and Joy Connock, marking the beginning of his writing career.

Shaper's English title and lyrics to the Italian melody "Softly, As I Leave You" (1962) was his first hit. It was initially released by Matt Monro and was soon recorded later in the US by Shirley Bassey. The song was repeatedly released in subsequent years, earning him enough money to start and reluctantly run his own music publishing company in 1964, Sparta Music.

Throughout his career, Shaper's work was released by well-known artists including Frank Sinatra, Bing Crosby, Elvis Presley, Barbra Streisand (for whom he wrote "Martina"), Petula Clark ("My Friend the Sea"), Jack Jones ("The Years of My Youth"), Val Doonican ("The Mysterious People"), Lena Horne, Bobby Darin and Richard Anthony. In addition, various other writers in the company brought about international successes, getting released by artists such as Moody Blues, Desmond Dekker, David Bowie and Blondie.

Shaper further created and published approximately 60 movie soundtracks for films such as The Go-Between (1971), Papillon (1973), The Boys from Brazil (1978), and First Blood (1982). For these, he won the Ivor Novello award multiple times.

He also wrote various musicals for the theatre. Along with composer Cyril Ornadel, he wrote two award-winning shows: Treasure Island, which ran for two seasons at the Mermaid Theatre; and Great Expectations, starring John Mills, Moira Lister and Lesley-Ann Down. After returning to South Africa, he wrote La Bohème Noire, a stage musical adaptation of La Bohème' set in contemporary Soweto.

Shaper married twice, first to Susan from 1972 to 1989 with whom he had a daughter, Hollie; and later to Pippa in 1990 with whom he had four children: Jack, Pia, Harry and Lucy. Hal Shaper died in Cape Town on 8 January 2004 at the age of 72.

== Songs ==
- I Still See You (from the film "The Go-Between", music by Michel Legrand.)
- My Friend, My Friend ("Stasera", music by Domenico Modugno)
- Softly, as I Leave You (as John Harris) ("Piano", music by Antonio De Vita.)
- The Mysterious People ("Det Gatfulla Folket", music by Beppe Wolgers and Olle Adolphson)
- Interlude (from the film "Interlude", music by Georges Delerue)
- It's a Long Road (end credits theme from "First Blood", music by Jerry Goldsmith, sung by Dan Hill)
- Martina ("Les Enfants Qui Pleurent", music by Michel Legrand)
- Sea and Sky (from the film "A Time for Loving", music by Michel Legrand), sung by Dusty Springfield
- My Friend the Sea ("Au Bord De L'eau", music by George Petilas)
