= If I Thought You'd Ever Change Your Mind =

Song written by John Cameron

"(I Will Bring You) Flowers in the Morning"
- UK single label

Single by Blond

from the album The Lilac Years
- A-side: "I Wake Up And Call"
- Released: 20 June 1969
- Recorded: 12 March 1969
- Studio: Advision, London
- Genre: Baroque pop
- Length: 3:11
- Label: Fontana
- Songwriter: John Cameron
- Producer: Anders Henriksson

Blond UK singles chronology
| "Halcyon Days" (1968) | "(I Will Bring You) Flowers in the Morning" (1969) |

Audio
- "(I Will Bring You) Flowers In The Morning" on YouTube

"If I Thought You'd Ever Change Your Mind" is a song written by British arranger John Cameron and initially recorded by Swedish pop band Blond (Tages) under the title "(I Will Bring You) Flowers in the Morning" for their album The Lilac Years (1969). Cameron initially wrote the song in 1966 after signing with KPM Music and was inspired by a female friend he was feeling unreqruited love for. After unsuccessfully trying to get the song recorded for three years, producer Anders Henriksson was introduced to him and decided to record it with Blond at Advision Studios in London. It was initially released as the B-side for their single "I Wake Up and Call" on 20 June 1969.

British producer George Martin heard the song when Henriksson played Blond's album The Lilac Years for him and decided that Cilla Black would record it. With an arrangement written by Mike Vickers and George Martin, Black's version of "If I Thought You'd Ever Change Your Mind" was released in November 1969 and reached the top-20 on the UK's Record Retailer chart and received positive reviews in the music press for the arrangement. In 2004, Agnetha Fältskog of Swedish pop group ABBA recorded the song as her comeback single after a 17-year long hiatus. It is one of Fältskog's most commercially successful singles but received primarily lukewarm reviews.

== Background and recording ==
British musician John Cameron started out his career as a member of various jazz ensembles, an inspiration that eventually led him to start arranging string quartets for other artists; one of his earliest prolific sessions was writing arrangements for Donovan's US number-one single "Sunshine Superman" in December 1965. This success brought some attention to Cameron, and in 1966 he signed a contract with publishers KPM Music, after which he was tasked to compose a song, which ended up being "If I Thought You'd Ever Change Your Mind". In a 2023 interview, Cameron revealed that the song's "words and music" were inspired by a female friend of his who he was experiencing unrequited love for. Author Nigel Rees instead believes that a verse in the song, "feed you winter fruits and summer wine", was a reference to Mary Renault's 1956 novel The Last of the Wine.

John Cameron was a really great pianist, he sat down and performed his song "Flowers in the Morning" for me. After that, we wrote the arrangement.

— Anders Henriksson (2008)

Meanwhile, vocalist Tommy Blom of Swedish pop band Tages quit for a solo career at the end of August 1968, prompting the remaining members to initially try finding a replacement for him before settling on continuing performing as a quartet. Following a single release that failed to chart in November 1968, Tages' contract with Parlophone expired, leaving them and new manager Richard Reese-Edwards to negotiate a new contract with another label;. Edwards then signed the band to Fontana Records, negotiating an advance of $50,000 (equal to ($438,975 in 2025), an amount previously unheard of for a Swedish pop group, in exchange for recording two albums and singles worth of original material. In late February 1969, Tages and producer Anders Henriksson travelled from Gothenburg to London to record an upcoming album.

Although the intention was for Tages to record original material penned by their bassist Göran Lagerberg and Henriksson together with Kathe Green or Adrian Moar, the band lacked two songs for a full-length 12-track LP. Moar introduced Henriksson to Cameron, who had unsuccessfully tried getting "If I Thought You'd Ever Change Your Mind" recorded for almost three years. Cameron performed a piano rendition of the song for Henriksson, after which the latter convinced Lagerberg to record it for the upcoming album. Cameron and Henriksson wrote string arrangements for the track overnight, and the song was the last track recorded for the album towards the end of their tenure in London on 12 March 1969 at Advision Studios. Henriksson produced with Cameron directing the string quartet. As with all other tracks on the album, Lagerberg sang lead vocals. Being a largely orchestrated baroque pop song, the involvement of Tages' guitarists Anders Töpel and Danne Larsson were minimal, with the two providing only sparse, brief staccato strums.

== Release and reception ==
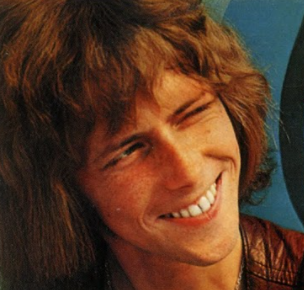
Göran Lagerberg's vocal performance on the song received mixed reviews.

Just a month before "If I Thought You'd Ever Change Your Mind" was about to be released, Tages' changed their name to the more internationally viable Blond at the suggestion of Reese-Edwards. Nonetheless, the song was initially released on 20 June 1969 as the B-side of the group's British single "I Wake Up And Call" through Fontana. (Note: Catalogue number TF 1040 / 262 023 TF.) On all releases of the song by Blond, it was retitled "(I Will Bring You) Flowers In The Morning", which was the song's opening verse; it is unclear as to why the title was changed, with Henriksson believing Fontana to have made that decision. Nonetheless, it later also appeared as the B-side of "I Wake Up And Call" in Norway and the Netherlands in August 1969, (Note: Catalogue number 262.023 TF.) as well as the B-side of Blond's debut US single "Deep Inside My Heart" in October 1969. (Note: Catalogue number H 1F-1673.) The song was finally issued as the penultimate track on side two of their album The Lilac Years, released in Sweden on 17 October 1969. (Note: Catalogue number TY 881 015.)

The single was not heavily promoted and thus failed to chart in the United Kingdom upon release, leading to the song's belated reviews primarily coming from Swedish newspapers and their assessments of The Lilac Years LP in October 1969. The staff reviewer for Svenska Dagbladet singles out "Flowers In The Morning" as one of the album's highlights, stating that it "holds itself against the high quality" of the otherwise self-penned numbers, finding the organ to sound "almost a bit ethereal". Dagens Nyheter's reviewer was also enthusiastic over the album's release but had mixed opinions regarding Lagerberg's vocal performance, particularly on the songs "Deep Inside my Heart" and "Flowers in the Morning", where he had to "strain his voice" to achieve the high notes required. Henriksson and Cameron's string arrangement was however praised as being somewhat intricate. Göteborgs-Posten's reviewer believed the song had the proportions of an "epic turned into music" due to the string arrangements.

In a retrospective review for AllMusic, music critic Richie Unterberger writes that "(I Will Bring You) Flowers In The Morning" brings melancholy to the otherwise "good-timey vibe" of the rest of The Lilac Years, comparing the organ to that of contemporary bands Procol Harum and the Zombies.

== Cilla Black version ==
"If I Thought You'd Ever Change Your Mind"
- UK single label

Single by Cilla Black
- B-side: "It Feels So Good"
- Released: 21 November 1969
- Recorded: 28 September 1969
- Studio: EMI, London
- Genre: Baroque pop; folk rock
- Length: 2:50
- Label: Parlophone
- Songwriter: John Cameron
- Producer: George Martin

Cilla Black singles chronology
| "Conversations" (1969) | "If I Thought You'd Ever Change Your Mind" (1969) | "Child of Mine" (1970) |

Audio
- "(If I Thought You'd Ever Change Your Mind" on YouTube

=== Background and recording ===
Throughout the first months of 1969, British singer Cilla Black was experiencing commercial success with the singles "Surround Yourself with Sorrow" and "Conversations", both of which managed to reach the top-10 of the Record Retailer chart. The majority of Black's material was chosen by her producer George Martin or acquaintances of his, primarily employees at his record company Associated Independent Recording (AIR). Henriksson, who produced Blond's version of the song, had signed with AIR in early 1969 and become close with Martin due to his round-trips from Sweden to London. It was during one of these trips that Henriksson played an acetate copy of The Lilac Years for Martin, who ended up enamoured with the record; in particular, Martin saw the commercial appeal of several songs, primarily "(I Will Bring You) Flowers In The Morning".

I played our [Blond's] version for George Martin, and he decided to record it with Cilla Black. But then the title changed to "If I Thought You'd Ever Change Your Mind!"

— Anders Henriksson (2008)

Martin reverted the title back to "If I Thought You'd Ever Change Your Mind" after requesting sheet music for the song by Cameron's publisher. Nonetheless, Martin felt that the baroque style would fit Black's voice and he booked a session with her at EMI Studios in London on 28 September 1969; it was the first time in over half a year that Black had entered a recording studio. Black's rendition also carries a more folk-like tone. The string quartet was conducted and arranged by former Manfred Mann-guitarist Mike Vickers and Martin, in addition to producing, also acted as a session musician playing harpsichord. The session also produced the song, "It Feels So Good", which was co-written by Gus Backus.

=== Release and reception ===
"If I Thought You'd Ever Change Your Mind" was released as a single in the UK on 21 November 1969 through Parlophone Records, backed by "It Feels So Good". (Note: Catalogue number R 5820.) A release in the United States followed in December 1969 through DJM Records; for this release, the song was re-titled "If You Should Ever Change Your Mind". In the UK, the single was caught up in the record-buying rush right before Christmas, taking over a month to chart before it entered the Record Retailer chart on 13 December 1969 at a position of 34. It would achieve a peak position of number 20 on 10 January 1970, becoming Black's 13th and penultimate top-20 hit in England. The song dropped out of the chart on 7 February 1970 at a position of 42, having spent 9 weeks on the charts. It also reached number 29 in the chart compiled by New Musical Express on 27 December 1969.

Despite becoming a top-20 hit in the UK, "If I Thought You'd Ever Change Your Mind" was considered somewhat of a chart failure, as Black's previous two domestic singles had reached the top-ten. Elsewhere in Europe, the song only charted in Ireland, where it reached number 19. In Oceania, the single managed to reach number 53 in Australia and entered the New Zealand top-10, peaking at number 7. The year 1969 started the decline of Black's chart success which she never managed to recover from. She had a final top-ten single with "Something Tells Me (Something's Gonna Happen Tonight)" in 1971, but never charted in the top-40 after that.

In a blind date for Melody Maker, soul singer Madeline Bell wrote that "If I Thought You'd Ever Change Your Mind" was a "nice, gentle record that only she [Black] could get away with now". Although Bell thought the single sounded "nice", she believed that the record didn't "kill me". Writing for New Musical Express, journalist Derek Johnson states that the song has an "unobtrusive beat" which benefits from Vicker's "attractive scoring". He believes the arrangement to "capture the mood" of the song to perfection. He praises Black's contrasting vocal performances during the verses, which she "whispers tenderly and sympathetically", and the chorus when the "beat intensifies" and sings more forcefully. However, he is critical that Black did not use her "characteristic belt". Peter Jones at Record Mirror writes that the single has an almost "classical start" to it, while offering a "quiet, gradual buildup" before ending up in a "hot-footed, wide ranged chorus". He ends his review on the positive note that "it's not a routine single".

After Black's death in August 2015, Bob Stanley wrote in The Guardian that "If I Thought You'd Ever Change Your Mind" was perhaps the "saddest" song she recorded in her career.

=== Charts ===
Weekly chart performance for "If I Thought You'd Ever Change Your Mind"
| Chart (1969–70) | Peak position |
|---|---|
| Australia (Kent Music Report) | 53 |
| Ireland (IRMA) | 19 |
| New Zealand (Listener) | 7 |
| UK (New Musical Express) | 29 |
| UK (Record Retailer) | 20 |

== Agnetha Fältskog version ==
"If I Thought You'd Ever Change Your Mind"

Single by Agnetha Fältskog

from the album My Colouring Book
- Released: 9 April 2004
- Studio: Atlantis, Stockholm
- Genre: Orchestral pop
- Length: 3:15
- Label: WEA
- Songwriter: John Cameron
- Producers: Agnetha Fältskog; Anders Neglin; Dan Strömkvist

Agnetha Fältskog singles chronology
| "The Queen of Hearts" (1998) | "If I Thought You'd Ever Change Your Mind" (2004) | "When You Walk in the Room" (2004) |

Music video
- "If I Thought You'd Ever Change Your Mind" on YouTube

=== Background and recording ===
Shortly after completing her third English-language studio album I Stand Alone in 1987, Swedish pop musician Agnetha Fältskog (formerly of pop group ABBA) went on an unofficial hiatus for almost 15 years, primarily because she felt that music was no longer a challenge for her. Instead, Fältskog pursued other interests, such as astrology, horse riding and yoga. In April 1999, ABBA musical Mamma Mia! premiered in London's West End theatre to critical acclaim from both audiences and critics alike. The production was so commercially successful that Fältskog was drawn back into recording music; she commenced in February 2003 at Atlantis Studios in Stockholm, Sweden to record an upcoming album.

Fältskog envisioned the album as a cover album, in that every song recorded is a cover from her teenage and childhood years during the 1950s and 1960s. In preparation for it, Fältskog spend roughly 4 years procuring a collection of primarily obscure vinyl records in order to assist in the creation of the album, according to The Guardian. Although Fältskog and Blond (during their time as Tages) had shared the same bill at concerts during the late 1960s, she instead based her version of "If I Thought You'd Ever Change Your Mind" on the cover by Black. Journalist Michael Osborn stated that the production of the song represented an "old-fashioned sense of song recording". It was recorded as a modernized orchestral pop song.

As with the rest of the album, "If I Thought You'd Ever Change Your Mind" was produced by Fältskog together with musicians Anders Neglin and Dan Strömkvist, who also conducted the string arrangement and performed drums, respectively. Musicians that perform on the track include ABBA guitarist Lasse Wellander.

=== Release and reception ===
"If I Thought You'd Ever Change Your Mind" was announced as the first single released from Fältskog's upcoming comeback album, which would be titled My Colouring Book. It had a radio debut on Swedish commercial radio station Rix FM on 8 March 2004. The song was released worldwide as a CD single on 9 April 2004, predating the release of My Colouring Book by two weeks. The B-sides on the single were various radio remixes of "If I Thought You'd Ever Change Your Mind" and varied in the different regions they were released in. With the exception of the archival release of "The Queen of Hearts" in 1998, "If I Thought You'd Ever Change Your Mind" was the first single release by Fältskog since "Let It Shine" in 1987.

"If I Thought You'd Ever Change Your Mind" debuted on Swedish record chart Hitlistan on 23 April 2004 at a position of number 2, before leaving the chart on 23 July at a position of 60, having spent 15 weeks on the chart. On the UK singles chart, the single debuted at number 11 on 24 April 2004, before leaving the chart on 22 May at a position of 55, having spent five weeks on the chart. The song remains Fältskog's highest charting solo single in the UK. Elsewhere in Europe, the single also reached the top-20 in Denmark and Scotland.

In his review for the single, Dan Backman of Svenska Dagbladet writes that "If I Thought You'd Ever Change Your Mind" remained "faithful to the Cilla Black version" and the Strömkvist's drum performance was inspired by Ringo Starr. Backman does note that Fältskog's voice is slightly weaker during the verses than during the choruses. Osborn writes that her rendition is "dramatic" and "delicately-wrought". Anders Larsson, writing for Aftonbladet, finds traces of Lennon–McCartney in the track but believes that Fältskog never puts personal emphasis on the song, instead performing it as an "experienced Schlager number".

=== Charts ===
==== Weekly charts ====
| Chart (2004) | Peak position |
|---|---|
| Belgium (Ultratop 50 Flanders) | 45 |
| Denmark (Tracklisten) | 12 |
| Hungary (Rádiós Top 40) | 24 |
| Netherlands (Dutch Top 40) | 31 |
| Netherlands (Single Top 100) | 76 |
| Scotland (OCC) | 13 |
| Sweden (Hitlistan) | 2 |
| Switzerland (Schweizer Hitparade) | 75 |
| UK Singles (OCC) | 11 |

==== Year-end charts ====
| Chart (2004) | Position |
|---|---|
| Sweden (Hitlistan) | 37 |
