= Arthur Hamilton =

American songwriter (1926–2025)

Background information
- Born: Arthur Hamilton Stern; October 22, 1926; Seattle, Washington, U.S.
- Origin: Hollywood, California, U.S.
- Died: May 20, 2025 (aged 98) Los Angeles, California, U.S.
- Genres: Popular music
- Occupation: Songwriter

Arthur Hamilton Stern (October 22, 1926 – May 20, 2025) was an American songwriter. He is best known for the song "Cry Me a River", first published in 1953 and recorded by Julie London and numerous other artists.

== Life and career ==
Arthur "Art" Stern was born in Seattle, Washington on October 22, 1926, the son of songwriter and comedian Jacob Abraham "Jack" Stern (1896–1985) and Grace Hamilton Stern née Leet (1883–1953). He moved as an infant with his family to Hollywood, California. He learned piano as a child, and also studied music theory and counterpoint.

He later began using the name Arthur Hamilton. In 1949 he wrote an early live television musical for KTTV in Los Angeles, California. He also worked for a music publishing company. In 1953, when under contract to Jack Webb, he contributed three songs to the film Pete Kelly's Blues, including "Sing A Rainbow" and "He Needs Me", sung by Peggy Lee. However, Hamilton's third song, "Cry Me a River", sung by Ella Fitzgerald, was dropped from the film, although Ella did go on to record it later in her career. The song's first release and most famous recording was by actress and singer Julie London – who had been Jack Webb's wife – in 1955. Her performance of the song in the 1956 film The Girl Can't Help It helped to make it a million-selling hit, reaching number 9 in the U.S. Billboard chart and number 22 in the UK singles chart. The song, which was also covered by Joe Cocker in 1970, contains the lyric: 'told me love was too plebeian, told me you were through with me 'n...'. In 2010, Hamilton attended a recording session at Capitol Records in Los Angeles, where the song was performed by Michael Bublé.

His compositions have been recorded by Dinah Washington, Archie Shepp, Harry Connick Jr., Barbra Streisand, Johnny Mathis, Ray Charles, Diana Krall, The Dells (whose version of "Sing a Rainbow" was an international hit in 1969), and others. On many occasions, Hamilton worked exclusively as a lyricist; his long list of collaborators includes such composers as Walter Jurmann, Armando Manzanero, Jerry Fielding, Johnny Mandel, Michel Legrand, David Raksin, Robert Ragland, Riz Ortolani, Terry Trotter, Lori Barth, Barry Mann, Dave Grusin, Walter Scharf, Joe Harnell, Leroy Holmes, Harriet Schock, Ron Anthony, and Patrick Williams. Hamilton was also nominated for an Oscar, two Emmys, and a Golden Globe.

He was a member of the board of governors of the Academy of Motion Picture Arts and Sciences (Music Branch), and a member of the board of the ASCAP Foundation.

Hamilton died at his home in Los Angeles, on May 20, 2025, at the age of 98.
