= Tony De Vita =

Italian composer

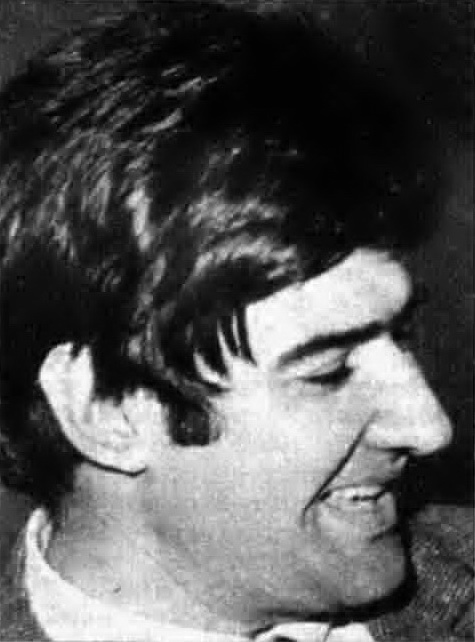
- Born: 10 February 1932; Milan, Italy
- Died: 14 January 1998 (aged 65); Ospedaletti, Italy

Antonio De Vita (10 February 1932 – 14 January 1998), best known as Tony De Vita, was an Italian composer, conductor, arranger and pianist.

Born in Milan, De Vita graduated at the Giuseppe Verdi Conservatory in his hometown. He started his career as a pianist, accompanying artists such as Johnny Dorelli and Betty Curtis. In 1963 he debuted on television as the conductor in the variety show La fiera dei sogni, and from then he appeared in dozens of popular shows, including Senza Rete, Fantastico and Domenica in.

De Vita composed over five hundred songs and musical scores. He is best known for his long collaboration with the singer Mina. Among his best known compositions, the song "Piano", which was later recorded by Matt Monro (1962), Doris Day (1963) and Frank Sinatra (1964) with the title "Softly, as I Leave You".
