= I Can Sing a Rainbow =

Nursery rhyme and children's song originated in the United States

Song
- Language: English
- Genre: Children's song, Nursery rhyme
- Songwriters: Arthur Hamilton, Traditional

"I Can Sing a Rainbow", also known simply as ''Rainbow Song'', "Sing a Rainbow", or ''I Can See a Rainbow'' is an English-language popular nursery rhyme and a children's song of American origin. The song was written by Arthur Hamilton. It was featured in the 1955 film Pete Kelly's Blues, where it was sung by Peggy Lee.

== Background ==
The song has been used to teach children names of colours. Despite the name of the song, two of the seven colours mentioned ("red and yellow and pink and green, purple and orange and blue") – pink and purple – are not actually a colour of the rainbow (i.e. they are not spectral colors; pink is a variation of shade, and purple is the human brain's interpretation of mixed red/blue [see line of purples]). They are also not presented in order of the visible light spectrum.

== Lyrics ==
Red and yellow and pink and green

Purple and orange and blue,

I can sing a rainbow,

Sing a rainbow,

Sing a rainbow too.

Listen with your ears,

Listen with your eyes,

And sing everything you see!

Other versions include:

Red and yellow and pink and green

Orange and purple and blue,

I can sing a rainbow,

Sing a rainbow,

Sing a rainbow too.

Listen with your ears,

Listen with your eyes,

And sing everything you see!

I can sing a rainbow,

Sing a rainbow,

Sing along with me…

== Versions ==
- Andy Williams released a version on his 1964 album, The Wonderful World of Andy Williams.
- David and Marianne Dalmour used the song as first track of their LP Introducing David and Marianne Dalmour.
- The British pop singer Cilla Black recorded the song for her 1966 studio album, Cilla Sings a Rainbow; the album title and cover sleeve were both inspired by the song. Black's second album was a commercial success, charting at number 4 on the UK Albums Chart. Due to popular demand, Black regularly performed the song in her live concert tours of the 1960s and 1970s.
- Irish singer Jackie Lee recorded a version for her 1968 album White Horses, produced by Derek Lawrence for Philips Records.
- In 1969, a recording by the Dells of the song in a medley with "Love is Blue" reached number 22 in the US pop charts, number 5 on the R&B charts, number 9 in Canada top singles chart (RPM) number 18 in Ireland, and number 16 in the UK charts.
- In 1980 a version appeared on the children's music cassette tape '20 All Time Junior Hits', released by Music For Pleasure Limited - TC MFP 50488. This was a reissue of an older release.
- In 2004 Delta Goodrem sang the song in a TV advertisement for Tourism Australia that aired in many countries.
- This song was also used as the theme song for the Philadelphia-based children's television program Captain Noah and His Magical Ark, with Williams' version as the opening theme and sung at the close of each episode by host W. Carter Merbreier as the show's titular character.
- Children's presenter Justin Fletcher sang the song on the 2008 album, Justin Fletcher Sings Something Special, based on the TV show of the same name. It was previously featured in the Something Special episode, Colours.
