= Surround Yourself with Sorrow =

- Side A of UK single

Single by Cilla Black

from the album Surround Yourself with Cilla
- B-side: "London Bridge"
- Released: 16 Feb 1969
- Genre: Pop rock
- Length: 2:34
- Label: Parlophone
- Songwriters: Bill Martin & Phil Coulter
- Producer: George Martin

Cilla Black singles chronology
"Where Is Tomorrow?" (1968)	"Surround Yourself with Sorrow" (1969)	"Conversations" (1969)

"Surround Yourself with Sorrow" is a song recorded by the English pop singer Cilla Black, which was released as a single and on the album Surround Yourself with Cilla in 1969. The song spent 12 weeks on the UK Singles Chart, peaking at No. 3, while reaching No. 5 on the Irish Singles Chart, No. 5 on the New Zealand Listener chart, No. 5 in Poland, No. 6 in Singapore, and No. 22 on Australia's Go-Set chart.

== Chart performance ==
Chart (1969)	Peak position
Australia (Go-Set)	22
Ireland (IRMA)	5
New Zealand Listener	5
Poland (Polish Pathfinders)	5
Singapore (Radio Singapore)	6
UK Singles Chart	3
