= Faith Brown =

British entertainer (born 1944)

- Born: Eunice Irene Carroll; 28 May 1944 (age 82); Liverpool, Merseyside, England
- Occupations: Comedian; actress; singer; impressionist
- Years active: 1966–2011
- Known for: Who Do You Do?; The Faith Brown Chat Show
- Spouse: Len Wady (m. 1963)
- Children: 1
- Musical career
- Genres: Rock; Pop; Funk; Soul; Beat; Theatre
- Instrument: Vocals
- Labels: Polydor; CBS; PYE; Electrecord; Regal Zonophone; Penny Farthing; Really Useful Records
- Formerly of: The Carrolls

Faith Brown (born Eunice Irene Carroll; 28 May 1944) is an English actress, singer, comedian and impressionist. She was a star of the ITV impressions show Who Do You Do?, and was The Voice in the TV show Trapped!.

Brown was born in Liverpool and attended St Francis De Sales School, Walton. She was a singer in a vocal group (The Carrolls) with her brothers, and was then for a time a solo singer, before using her talent for mimicry to switch to comedy impressions.

Her comedy special, The Faith Brown Awards, produced by London Weekend Television for the ITV network, received an audience of 9.8 million viewers when it was broadcast in September 1978. This was followed by the six-part series, The Faith Brown Chat Show, in January 1980. She won a TV Times Award for "Funniest Woman on TV" in the same year.

She has appeared as a guest star performing songs and impressions on several TV variety shows, including The Cannon and Ball Show, Summertime Special, Live from Her Majesty's, 3–2–1, The Grumbleweeds and The Little and Large Show.

She was the subject of This Is Your Life in 1982 when she was surprised by Eamonn Andrews while appearing as a guest on the ITV entertainment show Game for a Laugh.

As an actress, her television credits include the roles of Flast in the Doctor Who serial Attack of the Cybermen (1985) and Anne Bradley in the Channel 4 soap opera Brookside (1996).

On stage, she played Norma Desmond in the 2001–2002 UK tour of Sunset Boulevard. Her musical theatre credits also include the roles of Miss Hannigan in Annie at Guildford and Portsmouth, Stella Winters in the 1996 stage adaptation of Summer Holiday at the Opera House, Blackpool, Sister Mary Regina in the 2004 UK tour of Nunsense, and Diana Diamonte in Boys in the Buff at the Edinburgh Festival (2007).

She has appeared as a guest panellist on numerous game shows, including Celebrity Squares, Give Us a Clue, Blankety Blank, Punchlines, Win, Lose or Draw, Call My Bluff, What's My Line? and Wipeout.

She was a contestant on the reality show I'm a Celebrity…Get Me out of Here! in 2006.

== Selected television credits ==
Year	Title	Role	Notes
1975–1976	For My Next Trick	Herself, resident singer	14 episodes, BBC
1976	Ken Dodd's World of Laughter	Cast member	BBC
1976	Who Do You Do?	Various impressions	8 episodes, LWT
1977–1978	Celebrity Squares	Panellist	Episodes: 2.38, 2.41 & 3.9
1978	The Faith Brown Awards	Various impressions	LWT special
1979	Blankety Blank	Panellist	Episodes: 1.7 & 1.11
1979	Give Us a Clue	Panellist	Episode 2.8
1980	The Faith Brown Chat Show	Various impressions	6 episodes, LWT
1980	Cannon and Ball for Christmas	Special guest	LWT special
1981	Summertime Special	Guest – various impressions	1 episode, BBC
1981	Give Us a Clue	Panellist	Episode 4.2
1982	3–2–1	Guest star	Episode 4.2
1983	Live from Her Majesty's	Musical guest	1 episode, LWT
1983–1984	Punchlines	Herself	8 episodes, LWT
1984	Bullseye	Guest star	Episode 4.10
1984	Give Us a Clue	Panellist	Episode 6.20
1984	The Grumbleweeds' Radio Show	Herself – musical guest	1 episode
1984–1985	Blankety Blank	Panellist	Episodes: 7.13, 8.1 & 9.13
1985	Doctor Who	Flast	Guest star, Attack of the Cybermen Part II, BBC
1985	The Sooty Show	Herself	Episode "I'm Clever Too"
1986	I Feel Fine	Various impressions	Granada TV Special
1986	Cinderella: The Shoe Must Go On	Fairy Godmother	Central Independent Television Special
1986	3–2–1	Guest star	Episode 9.4
1989	The Little and Large Show	Guest star	Episode 9.8
1989	What's My Line?	Self – panellist	Episode 8.8
1992	Surprise Surprise	Herself	1 episode
1992–1996	Win, Lose or Draw	Guest panellist	15 episodes, Scottish Television
1996	Brookside	Anne Bradley	7 episodes, Mersey Television
1997	Call My Bluff	Panellist	2 episodes
1998	Wipeout	Herself – special guest	Celebrity special
2003	Life Beyond the Box: Margot Leadbetter	Herself	
2006	I'm a Celebrity...Get Me Out of Here!	Herself	Contestant, Series 6
2008	Celebrity Juice	Amy Winehouse	Episode 1.2
2008–2010	Trapped!	The Voice	39 episodes, CBBC

== Selected theatre credits ==
Year	Title	Role	Venue	Ref
1987	Beauty is the Business	Lilla Daniels	UK national tour	
1989–1990	Cinderella		Epsom Playhouse	
1996	Summer Holiday	Stella Winters	Opera House Theatre, Blackpool	
1997	The Farndale Avenue Housing Estate Townswomen’s Guild Dramatic Society Murder Mystery	Mrs Reece	UK national tour	
2000–2001	Dick Whittington	Fairy Bow Bells	Theatre Royal, Norwich	
2001–2002	Sunset Boulevard	Norma Desmond	UK national tour	
2004	Nunsense	Sister Mary Regina	UK national tour	
2004–2005	Cinderella	Fairy Godmother	Capitol Theatre, Horsham	
2005–2006	Cinderella	Wicked Stepmother	The Lowry	
2007	Faith Brown: Up Front	Herself	UK national tour	
2007	Boys in the Buff	Diana Diamonte	Edinburgh Festival Fringe	
2009	The Best of British Variety Tour	Herself	UK national tour	
2010	The Stars are Coming Out Tonight – A Charity Gala	Herself	Fairfield Halls	

== Discography ==
=== Albums ===
With The Carrolls:

- 1967: "The Carrolls", Electrecord

=== Singles ===
With The Carrolls:

- 1966: "Surrender Your Love" / "The Folk I Love", Polydor Records
- 1968: "So Gently Falls the Rain" / "Nice to See You Darling", CBS Records
- 1968: "Ever Since" / "Come On", CBS Records
- 1968: "Lemon Balloon and a Blue Sky" / "Make Me Belong to You", CBS Records
- 1969: "We're In This Thing Together" / "We Know Better", CBS Records

Solo Recordings:

- 1970: "Lock Me In" / "The Game of Love", CBS Records
- 1971: "Any Way That You Want Me" / "City Wine", Penny Farthing Records
- 1972: "Take Me with You" / "If We Only Have Love", Regal Zonophone Records
- 1973: "Stone the Crows" / "Turn on the Light", Pye Records
- 1974: "Your Love's an Illusion" / "Right Between the Eyes", Pye Records
- 1975: "Bingo" / "Saturday Night Is the Night for a Party", Pye Records

As featured artist:

- 1985: "Doctor in Distress" (as part of Who Cares?), Record Shack Records

=== Cast recordings ===
- 2001: "Songs from Andrew Lloyd Webber's Sunset Boulevard" (with Earl Carpenter), Really Useful Records

=== Compilations ===
- 2000: "You Are Awful... But We Like You! (Showbiz Comedy Titbits Of The 60s and 70s)" (Track: "Stone the Crows"), Sequel Records
- 2009: "The Girls Are At It Again: UK Beat Girls 1964-1969" (Track: "Surrender Your Love"), Universal Music
- 2022: "...But I Like You: Celebrities in the Studio" (Track: "Bingo"), Countdown Media
- 2023: "Let's Go Disco: Britain's Dancing Years" (Track: "Your Love's an Illusion"), Countdown Media
- 2024: "Denim Disco: The World of Glam Pop Floorfillers" (Track: "Right Between the Eyes"), Countdown Media
