= Ted Rogers (comedian) =

English comedian and TV host (1935–2001)

- Born: Edward George Rodgers; 20 July 1935; Kennington, London, England
- Died: 2 May 2001 (aged 65); St Thomas' Hospital, London, England
- Occupation: Television comedian
- Years active: 1960s – 2001
- Children: 4

Edward George Rodgers (20 July 1935 – 2 May 2001) was an English comedian and light entertainment host who started his career as a Redcoat entertainer. He was best known for hosting the Yorkshire Television game show 3-2-1 from 1978 to 1988.

== Early life and career ==
Rogers was born in Kennington, South London, the son of Edward Rodgers, a soap machine operator, and Lily May Rodgers née Cobb, an office cleaner. He went to school in Lambeth. His idol as a youngster was Danny Kaye, and Rogers won a holiday camp talent contest impersonating Kaye as a youngster, but he would later put all showbusiness offers on hold whilst he did his national service in the Royal Air Force.

In the early 1960s, Rogers appeared as a stand up comedian on the radio programme Billy Cotton Band Show, alongside singers such as Tom Jones, Cliff Richard and Alma Cogan and comedians Terry Scott and Hugh Lloyd. He went on to host Sunday Night at the London Palladium in 1974. Rogers also appeared on the comedy panel game Jokers Wild. He was asked by Perry Como to join him on his tour of Britain in 1975 as a comedian after a Royal Variety Performance.

Bing Crosby later invited Rogers to join him on his concerts of 1976 and 1977, to form a double act and sing "Gone Fishin'" with Crosby as a tribute to Louis Armstrong. TV programme: Whilst on tour in 1977, Rogers was asked to film a pilot for a new television game show for Yorkshire Television.

== Gameshow host ==
=== 3-2-1 ===
Rogers became the presenter of ITV's variety gameshow 3-2-1 in 1978. It ran for just over ten years in a top-rating Saturday night slot. He earned £130,000 a year in the early 1980s from 3-2-1 alone and combined this with a career as a highly paid after-dinner speaker, also making regular cabaret and public appearances.

In March 1986, he was featured on This Is Your Life. Rogers was surprised by host Eamonn Andrews in Covent Garden, central London, with guests on the show including Jimmy Edwards and Sacha Distel.

3-2-1 was cancelled in December 1987, when it was still attracting audiences of 12 million and in the Top 20 ratings. Initially, the plan was for the show to carry on with Christmas and one-off specials. There was an Olympics special shown in September 1988, and a Christmas special that year, which was the final ever episode. In April 1996, Rogers told the Sunday Mirror that "The Oxbridge lot got control of TV and they didn't really want [the show]. It was too downmarket for them. We were still getting 12 million viewers when they took it off after 10 years. These days if a show gets nine million everyone does a lap of honour".

=== After 3-2-1 ===
In 1989, Rogers appeared on the ITV game show You Bet! In the early 1990s, Rogers fell on hard times and was declared bankrupt in February 1992, having apparently invested his fortune in a failed business venture, Wyvern Rogers Television. His three bedroom family bungalow at Chenies Avenue, Little Chalfont, Buckinghamshire, was repossessed, and Rogers' production company collapsed with debts of £50,000. He moved from Buckinghamshire to a more modest home in Haslemere, Surrey.

Rogers was a guest on Celebrity Squares in January 1993, in April 1994 he appeared on Surprise Surprise, and in August of that year he was a guest on the BBC comedy panel show Gagtag.

In 1997–98, Rogers appeared in a touring production of Danny and Me, a play about his hero, Danny Kaye, which often sold out. Towards the end of the decade, Challenge TV began repeating episodes of 3-2-1.

In 1999 and 2000, Rogers made several commercials for fast food chain McDonald's. On 10 November 2000, Rogers appeared as a guest on TFI Friday. His final television appearance, which was screened at the end of January 2001, saw him playing the host of a downmarket quiz show in the Series 13 episode Let's Get Quizzical of the BBC children's sitcom ChuckleVision. Had he lived, he would have worked with his old friend Jackie Mason on a vaudeville-type act in America which was due to start in October 2001.

== Personal life and death ==
Rogers was married twice. He married his childhood sweetheart Marge, in 1953, with whom he had two daughters. In 1979, he married Marion, with whom he had a daughter and a son.

On 2 May 2001, Rogers died after emergency open-heart surgery to repair a heart valve at St Thomas' Hospital in London, aged 65. He was buried at St Michael and All Angels Church, Sunninghill, in Berkshire.

== Discography ==
=== Singles and EPs ===
- "I Can't Stop Thinking Of You" (1965), Piccadilly
- "The Man From Cuckoo" (1966), Piccadilly
- "L'amour" / Cool Date (1967), Pye
- "Beware Of Mr. Shark" (1976), Sol-Doon
- "Dusty Bin" (1982), Patch Records (Ted Rogers with the Young 'Uns)
