= A Jubilee of Music =

- Genre: Music
- Written by: Austin Steele
- Directed by: Stewart Morris
- Presented by: Dame Vera Lynn
- Country of origin: United Kingdom
- Original language: English
- No. of episodes: 1

Production
- Producer: Stewart Morris
- Production locations: BBC Television Centre, London
- Running time: 75 minutes

Original release
- Network: BBC1
- Release: 31 December 1976

A Jubilee of Music is a one-off BBC Television entertainment show lasting 75 minutes, broadcast on 31 December 1976 at 10:30pm on BBC1. The show was produced to celebrate the British music successes of the first 25 years of Elizabeth II's reign, on the eve of 1977, the year of her Silver Jubilee. Some non-British artists (notably Val Doonican and Rolf Harris) also took part, performing their British hits. Choreography for The Young Generation was directed by Nigel Lythgoe. Alyn Ainsworth conducted the BBC Concert Orchestra for the live performances.

== Description ==
The show was produced and directed by Stewart Morris, and was recorded at BBC Television Centre in December 1976.It was shown on several European networks at the start of 1977, including Belgian, Dutch, German, Swedish and Norwegian TV, as well as several networks in Africa and the Antipodes.

The show was hosted by Dame Vera Lynn, who opened the programme with a medley of British hits by leading British songwriters, spanning from 1952 to 1976. The medley sung by Lynn included songs by Paul McCartney, John Lennon, Mick Jagger, Leslie Bricusse, Lionel Bart, Don Black and Norman Newell. The medley ended with the UK's 1976 Eurovision Song Contest winner, "Save Your Kisses for Me".

The guests on the programme either performed live in the studio, or were filmed on location, lip-synching to their songs. The majority of artists performed their biggest hit from the period covered, while Cliff Richard, opted to perform his current single release.

The programme received its first-ever repeat on BBC TV on May 29, 2022, to celebrate Queen Elizabeth's Platinum Jubilee. For this repeat, Rolf Harris's performance was not included.

== Performances ==
- Vera Lynn – various medleys & solo spots
- The Young Generation – various medleys including songs from theatrical shows
- Cliff Richard – Hey Mr. Dream Maker (Video)
- Lulu – Shout
- Helen Shapiro – Walkin' Back to Happiness
- Ken Dodd – Tears
- Norman Wisdom – Don't Laugh At Me ('Cause I'm a Fool)
- Kathy Kirby – Secret Love (Video)
- Val Doonican – Walk Tall
- Rolf Harris – Two Little Boys (Video)
- Petula Clark – Downtown (Video)
- Max Bygraves – All By Yourself in the Moonlight
- Matt Monro – A Portrait of My Love
- Kenny Ball & His Jazzmen - Midnight in Moscow
