= Especially for You (disambiguation) =

"Especially for You" is a 1988 duet between Kylie Minogue and Jason Donovan.

Especially for You may also refer to:

- Especially for You (Cilla Black album), 1980
- Especially for You (Don Williams album), 1981
- Especially for You (Duane Eddy album), 1959
- Especially for You (The Smithereens album), 1986
