= Lygo =

Lygo is a surname. Notable people with the surname include:

- Carl Lygo (born 1967), British barrister and academic
- Ian Lygo (born 1958), British civil servant
- Kevin Lygo (born 1957), British television executive
- Mark Lygo, English politician
- Raymond Lygo (1924–2012), British Royal Navy officer
