= Annie St John =

British broadcaster (1954–1990)

- Born: 8 September 1954; Blackpool, Lancashire, England
- Died: 10 December 1990 (aged 36); Bristol, Avon, England
- Occupation: Television presenter
- Known for: 3-2-1, HTV presenter
- Spouse: Michael St John (m. 1976)

Annie St John (born Ann Florence Heywood; 8 September 1954 – 10 December 1990) was a British television broadcaster.

Originally from Blackpool, Lancashire, she attended Blackpool Collegiate Grammar School for Girls and the Rose Bruford Drama School. She worked as a mahout at the Blackpool Tower Circus and in repertory theatre in Bolton, Salisbury and the Young Vic in London.

St John first made her name on television in 1978 as a hostess on the first two series of the networked YTV game show 3-2-1, before joining HTV West in 1981 as a continuity announcer and newsreader. Her popularity in the West Country was as such that viewers launched a Save Our Annie campaign when she left the station in 1983 to join Tyne Tees Television in Newcastle. During her time at Tyne Tees, St John continued to freelance for HTV West and also for London Weekend Television. She returned to HTV permanently in 1987.

As well as announcing duties, St. John presented various regional programmes including Ask Oscar, a weekly What's On programme, It's Nearly Saturday and the advice series Problems. By the late 1980s, St John had become one of the main anchors of the nightly regional news programme, HTV News, alongside Bruce Hockin and Richard Wyatt, while maintaining her continuity role. She also presented a request show for the independent local radio station Radio West.

== Death ==
On Saturday 3 November 1990, St John took a lethal overdose of champagne and drugs at her flat in Baltic Wharf, Bristol. She was found semi-conscious and naked on a bed by HTV director of programming Derek Clark and a staff rigger following concern from colleagues when St John failed to turn up for work.

On Monday 10 December 1990 – 38 days after the overdose - St John died in hospital at the age of 36. She had been married to an HTV colleague, actor Michael St John, for 14 years, though had been in a relationship for six months before the overdose with an HTV journalist, Nick Kerswell, after separating from her husband. The inquest into her death recorded a verdict of suicide.
