= Alyn Ainsworth =

British singer and conductor (1924–1990)

Alyn Ainsworth (24 August 1924 – 4 October 1990) was a British musician, singer and conductor of light entertainment music.

== Education and early career ==
Born in Bolton, Lancashire, England, he was educated at Canon Slade Grammar School on a scholarship but never completed his education there, as Ainsworth was recognized by Herman Darewski at the age of 14 and allowed to tour with his dance band as a boy soprano. When his voice broke he learned to play the guitar and played in local dance bands whilst working as a hat salesman. Ainsworth eventually worked for Bolton Parks Department and later as a golf professional. He then joined Oscar Rabin's orchestra, where he both played with the band and did musical arrangements; they also broadcast on the radio. Ainsworth also worked with Geraldo, but turned down an offer from Val Parnell to conduct the London Palladium Orchestra. Ainsworth chose in 1951 to join the BBC Northern Dance Orchestra, the BBC's then in-house big band, as its arranger-conductor.

== Later career ==
Ainsworth achieved a huge degree of success with the BBC NDO, whose reputation as one of the top bands in the UK was in no small amount due to his hard work and high standards. In 1956, he announced his engagement to Teddie Beverley of the Beverley Sisters during Sunday Night at the London Palladium. They could not marry immediately and in 1957 he announced that the engagement was cancelled.

He resigned from the BBC in 1960 and went freelance. He was signed up by Granada TV to replace Peter Knight as presenter of Spot the Tune.

In 1965, he conducted the orchestra at the Royal Command Performance at the London Palladium for the third time. He conducted the UK entry in the Eurovision Song Contest four times in 1975, 1976, 1978 and 1990 and once for Belgium in 1977. He conducted The Seekers' July 1968 farewell special on BBC. He was the musical director for the BBC's anniversary programme Fifty Years Of Music broadcast in 1972. In 1978, he provided the music for the LWT show Lena and Bonnie, and in 1979 Alyn Ainsworth and His Orchestra provided the music for the BBC show Lena Zavaroni and Music. Along with Alan Roper he provided the musical arrangements for the show.

Throughout his final years, he continued to collaborate with composers for some of LWT's biggest entertainment shows including Cilla Black's Surprise Surprise and Live From Her Majesty's.

Ainsworth died in London aged 66.
