= Trapped! (TV series) =

British children's game show

- Titlecard
- Also known as: Trapped!: Ever After (2010)
- Genre: Children's television series
- Created by: Rob Hyde
- Directed by: James Morgan
- Presented by: Simon Greenall
- Starring: Simon Greenall; Eve Karpf; Faith Brown; Olly Pike; Helen Evans
- Country of origin: United Kingdom
- Original language: English
- No. of series: 4
- No. of episodes: 52

Production
- Running time: 25 minutes per episode (approx.)
- Production company: CBBC Production

Original release
- Network: BBC One (Series 1); CBBC Channel (Series 2-4)
- Release: 28 September 2007 – 4 November 2010

Trapped! (known in its final series as Trapped!: Ever After) is a British children's dark fantasy-themed adventure game show that was first shown on BBC channels from 28 September 2007 through to 4 November 2010.

== Plot ==
The show is set in a dark, six-floor fictional tower with windows which, from the opening titles, is situated on a small island in the middle of the open sea. Every episode is introduced by "The Caretaker" (played by Simon Greenall), a male world traveller who only came there for one good night's sleep, but he was imprisoned there by "The Voice" (performed by Eve Karpf in series 1 and Faith Brown from series 2-4) after they caught him trespassing on their domain. To eventually earn his freedom, the Caretaker must trap as many children (referred to in the programme as "Unfortunates") as the Voice personally deems worthy.

Six human children compete on each episode and are brought to the tower by another captive, "Wiley Sneak" (physically portrayed by Olly Pike). Locked in a lift-like cage and winched up by The Caretaker via a simple wheel and pully system, the children begin at the top of the tower and must journey down to the bottom; one child is eliminated or "trapped" on each floor, and the last one remaining receives the "Key of Freedom" and escapes. Sequestered in the attic of the tower, Caretaker occasionally offers commentary and instructions while viewing the events through his "Watch Tank," a large and delicate globe mounted within a frame that gives a 360° overhead view of the relevant portion of the tower.

=== Trapped! (2007–2009) ===
Each contestant is given an earpiece receiver, or "Whisper Clip," that they must wear during the competition. Each floor of the tower poses a different challenge to the team, demonstrated by Wiley while the Caretaker provides instructions through both live commentary and pre-recorded voiceover. Before each challenge begins, one contestant is informed by The Voice, via their Whisper Clip that they have been chosen to act as a "Saboteur," and must try to make the team fail without being detected by the others. Throughout each task, The Voice guides the Saboteur via the Whisper Clip attached to their ear, advising them of the best way to successfully sabotage each task.

If the team passes the challenge, the Saboteur automatically becomes trapped on that floor and the others move down through the tower. If the team fails, each contestant casts one vote as to the Saboteur's identity; the one who receives the most votes becomes trapped, regardless of whether or not they were the Saboteur. A "draw straws" box is used in the event of a tie, and the one who draws the shortest straw is trapped.

The final two contestants compete in "The Fight for Freedom," a timed quiz consisting of alternating questions that tests their recall of the events of the episode. When time runs out, the high scorer wins the game and uses the Key of Freedom to leave the tower.

=== Trapped!: Ever After (2010) ===
Trapped!: Ever After title card

For 2010, changes were made to the format of the programme, particularly in areas of themes, the games and interaction with the Unfortunates. Introducing a brand new attic for the Caretaker, recaps were made of previously trapped unfortunates on higher floors of the tower and the appearance of the Voice was revised. The final round was revised to put both contestants in a best-of-seven Q&A round, represented by a four-step path toward the Key of Freedom; a correct answer allowed a contestant to advance one step, while a miss allowed the opponent to do so. The first one to reach the Key became the winner. In the cases of both contestants being one step away, one of them must answer their question correctly first. If both are wrong, it keeps on going until someone gets it right.

== Music ==
The music is written by Dobs Vye, a composer who specialises in writing for television.

== Cast and crew ==
=== Voice cast ===
- Simon Greenall as The Caretaker (all series, all episodes)
- Eve Karpf as The Voice (Series 1 only)
- Faith Brown as The Voice (Series 2–4)
- Olly Pike as Wiley Sneak (all series, all episodes)
- Helen Evans as Ethel the Witch (Series 1), Miss Mutternot (Series 2–4), Madame Deux Visage (Series 2–3), the Crowman (Series 3)
- Peter Wardell as Boris the Organist (Series 1) and The One-Eyed Watcher (Series 2–3)
- Matthew Wren as Moonhowler (Series 2–3)
- Eloise Dale as Midnight Bride and Frozen Princess (Series 4)
- Sophie-Louise Dann as Evil Granny (Series 4)
- Jolana Lee as Split Ends (Series 4)
- Dusty Limits as Marriage Man (Series 4)
- Djalenga Scott as Esmé the Creature Transformer and Scarlett the Wolf Hunter (Series 4)
- Kiran Shah as The Grimble (Series 4)
- Leisha Wickham as Millicent (Series 4)
- Brian Wheeler as The Baby Botherer (Series 4)

=== Crew ===
- Director – James Morgan
- Producer and creator – Rob Hyde
- Writers – Carl Carter and Tony Cooke
- Art director – Catherine Land
- Set design – Richard Drew
- Lighting director – James Campbell

== Production ==
On 8 May 2008, Belgian production company Studio 100 through its Munich-based German distribution division Studio 100 Media signed a deal with CBBC with the division had acquired worldwide distribution to CBBC's gameshow Trapped! outside of UK, United States and Latinoamerica, thus marked the first time that's BBC's in-house childrens television series not to be distributed by BBC's own distribution arm BBC Worldwide However, distribution to the series would later be brought back in-house when BBC Worldwide had brought back worldwide distribution to the series five years later on 16 April 2013.

== Transmissions ==
Series	Start date	End date	Episodes
1	28 September 2007	21 December 2007	13
2	10 July 2008	2 October 2008	13
3	2 January 2009	27 March 2009	13
4 ("Ever After")	18 October 2010	4 November 2010	13

== See also ==
- Legends of the Hidden Temple, the Nickelodeon game show with a similar premise
- Steam Punks!, the ABC3 game show with a similar premise
- De Mol, a Belgian reality game show franchise with a similar premise
- De Verraders, a Dutch reality game show franchise with a similar premise.
  - The Traitors - The British version of De Verraders that airs on the BBC.
