= Dougie Squires =

English choreographer (1932–2023)

- Born: 16 February 1932; Nottingham
- Died: 21 May 2023 (aged 91)
- Occupation: choreographer

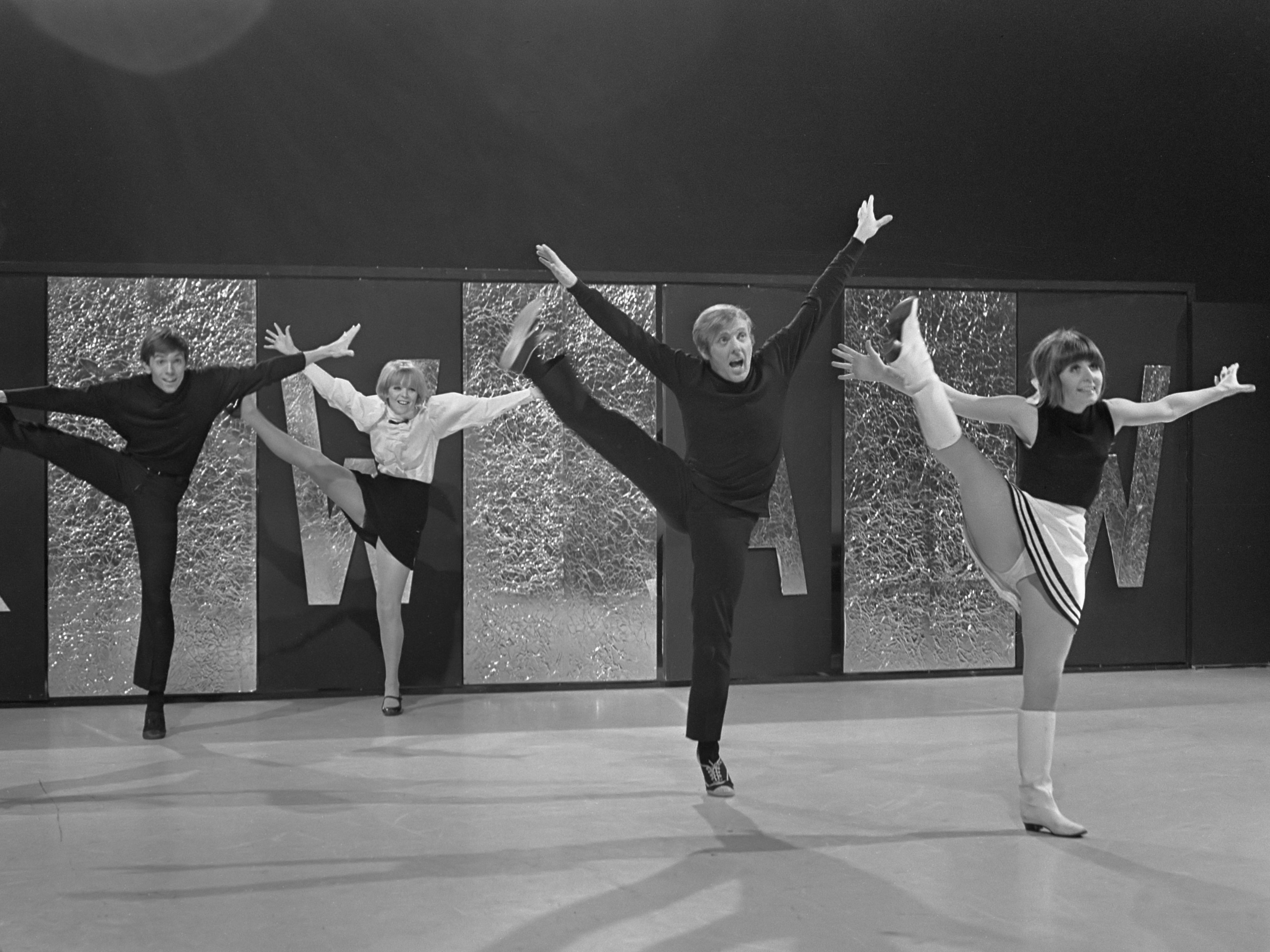
The Dougie Squires Dancers (1968)

Douglas William Squires OBE MVO (16 February 1932 – 21 May 2023) was an English choreographer, known best for his work in television from the mid-1950s. He was born in Nottingham.

Squires died on 21 May 2023, at the age of 91.

== Choreography ==
The groups he choreographed for television included:

- The Young Generation
- The Dougie Squires Dancers
- Dougie Squires' Second Generation
- The Dougie Squires Dozen

As well as television work he was involved with theatrical productions and fund-raising events. In 2009 he was appointed as an officer of the Order of the British Empire for his services to the Performing Arts and was appointed Member of the Royal Victorian Order (MVO) in the 2017 New Year Honours for services to choreography and stage direction of royal pageants.

== The Young Generation ==
The Young Generation were a dancing and singing group created specifically for BBC television in the late 1960s and thus were the first act of their kind to regularly appear on British TV. The troupe were choreographed originally by Dougie Squires who chose the founding members of the troupe. The group were mainly dancers, but also sang songs either accompanying other singers or performing stand alone numbers. Their BBC debut came on the 1967 series The Rolf Harris Show.

The line up for the Young Generation often changed, but the original teams consisted of: Sue Avory, Valerie Barrett, Bobby Bannerman, Mike Bevan, James Capehorn, Ann Chapman, Harvey Clark, Ray Cornell, Joanna Cram, Jackie Dalton, Ray Davies, Marlene Domanska, Dee Eldridge, Brian Evans, Pat Goh, Sally Graham, Johnny Greenland, Roger Hannah, David Hepburn, Jane Herbert, Linda Herbert, Harry Higham, Bob Howe, Roger Howlett, Terry Jones, Lesley Judd, Janie Kells, Linda Laurence, Scott Mackee, Judy Monks, Jenny Morgan, Rhys Nelsen, John Parsons, Terry Roberts, Brian Rogers, Margie Rumney, Joseph Saber, Cheryl St. Claire, Frederick Share, Barrie Stevens, Ricky Stratful, Donald Torr, Maggie Vieler, Michael Tye-Walker, Pauline Wall, Andy Wallace, Rae Wallace, Gerry Wedge, Miranda Willis and Wei Wei Wong. The group continued working with Rolf Harris on Show Of The Week hosted by Harris on BBC2, 19 May 1968. Later that year, they became the resident dance/singing act on BBC2's International Cabaret, appearing alongside such acts as Massiel, Georgia Brown, Gilbert Becaud and Tessie O'Shea. During this time, they also appeared with Rolf Harris on his own BBC1 TV series. During this TV run, new members joining the troupe included Heather Beckers, Marie Betts, Iain Burton, Catherine Collins. Chris Cooper, Roger Finch, Denise Fone, Danny Grover, Carolyn Heywood, Erik-Jack, Linda Joliff, Kay Korda, Patricia Lovet, Denis Morrissey, Peter Newton, Sandy Penson, Jeremy Robinson, Terry Robinson (a.k.a. Terry Calloway), Ricky Stratful and Trevor Willis. Nigel Lythgoe and Ken Warwick joined the group in 1969, before becoming two of television's most successful choreographers and producers later in their own right.

In 1970, the troupe continued to appear on BBC2's Show Of The Week and other BBC series in which they appeared included Lulu at Berns Restaurant, A Royal Television Gala Performance, The British Screen Awards, The Rod McKuen Show and Fifty Years Of Music. On Christmas Day 1969, they appeared simultaneously on BBC1 and BBC2, starring in Christmas Night With The Stars, hosted by Val Doonican on BBC1 and in their own 'special' Jesus on BBC2. In January 1970, they were given their own self-titled BBC2 TV series, while concurrently running 'specials' on BBC1 included The Young Generation meet Lulu, The Young Generation meet Esther Ofarim and The Young Generation meet Shirley Bassey, Another regular series with Rolf Harris followed in 1970 and 1971 on BBC1 and on BBC2, they starred alongside Kenneth Williams in Meanwhile on BBC2. Later in 1971, they appeared with Vera Lynn in Show Of The Week and Don Lurio temporarily replaced Squires as the troupe's choreographer. Their next BBC series came in 1972 on BBC1 in Engelbert with The Young Generation starring Engelbert Humperdinck. In 1973, they starred alongside Vince Hill in BBC2's series They Sold A Million. The same year saw another series: The Young Generation Big Top, which featured Clodagh Rodgers, The Bachelors, Danny La Rue and Sandie Shaw. A second series of They Sold A Million aired in 1974, followed the same year by Ken Dodd's World Of Laughter on BBC1. Their last BBC series was The Musical Time Machine which aired on BBC2 in 1977. They continued to appear regularly with Vera Lynn on BBC shows, including A Jubilee Of Music in 1976.

Later members of the group who had joined by 1973 included Vonnie Barnes, Walter Cartier, David Hampshire, Veronica France, Jerry Manley, Kay Frazer, John Melainey, Jackie Hall, Steven Payne, Martine Howard, ( later to become lead singer with (Guys 'n' Dolls) Georgina Keane, Karen Knight, Sue Lake, Di Palmer, Liz Robertson, Benita Shawe, Michelle Thorne, Spencer Shires, Donald Torr, Trevor Willis and Geoff Richer who also went on to be a successful choreographer, launching his own troupe Geoff Richer's First Edition who appeared on many TV shows, including Seaside Special.

Although under contract and owned by the BBC, outside of television, the troupe also made stage appearances, including the 10-week run of Meet Me In London at the Adelphi Theatre with Tommy Steele beginning in April 1971.

Lesley Judd went on to become well-known, despite walking out of the troupe in breach of contract. Soon after she joined Blue Peter and became a regular TV and radio presenter through to the early 1990s. Wei Wei Wong had other minor TV roles (including Warship and Spy!) and appeared briefly in the James Bond film The Man with the Golden Gun and was a hostess on both ITV's The Golden Shot and 3-2-1. Wong was also a member of the subsequent 'The Second Generation'. Sally Graham left the group early on to become one of the short-lived founder members of The New Seekers. Singer David Van Day was a later member of the group, as was Mary Corpe who later joined Pan's People.

BBC TV Series:

- 1967 The Rolf Harris Show (BBC1) 12 Episodes
- 1968 International Cabaret from Sweden (BBC2) 3 Episodes
- 1968 International Cabaret from The Talk of the Town (BBC2) 3 Episodes
- 1969 The Rolf Harris Show (BBC1) 13 Episodes
- 1969 Show of the Week: The Young Generation Meet... (BBC2) 4 Episodes
- 1970 The Young Generation (BBC1) 16 Episodes
- 1970 The Young Generation Meet... (BBC1) 3 Episodes
- 1970–71 The Rolf Harris Show (BBC1) 14 Episodes
- 1971 Meanwhile on BBC2 (BBC2) 10 Episodes
- 1971 Show of the Week: Vera Lynn (BBC2) 6 Episodes
- 1972 Engelbert with The Young Generation (BBC1) 13 Episodes
- 1973 They Sold A Million (BBC2) 15 Episodes
- 1973 The Young Generation Big Top (BBC2) 6 Episodes
- 1973–74 The Vera Lynn Show (BBC2) 7 Episodes
- 1974 They Sold A Million (BBC2) 13 Episodes
- 1974 Ken Dodd's World Of Laughter (BBC1) 6 Episodes
- 1975 The Vera Lynn Show (BBC2) 11 Episodes
- 1975 The Musical Time Machine (BBC2) 12 Episodes
- 1977 The Musical Time Machine (BBC2) 7 Episodes

== The Second Generation ==
Squires developed a second, similar troupe in the early 1970s which was freelance and under his management, the similar, but short-lived concept troupe named The Second Generation, which included amongst many others Wei Wei Wong (who transferred from the Young Generation) and Debbie McGee. Although this troupe appeared on BBC television, they were free to appear on rival broadcasters and independently of TV. The troupe had a short-lived series on ITV in 1972 2Gs and the Pop People, that ran for six episodes and featured Slade, Sandie Shaw, The Bee Gees and Lulu. They also appeared on a 1974 edition of Sunday Night At The London Palladium on ITV. Some of the troupe reunited with Squires in 2016.
