= Especially for You (Cilla Black album) =

Studio album by Cilla Black
- Released: 1 September 1980
- Recorded: 1980 at Abbey Road Studios, London
- Genres: Soft Rock, Pop, Vocal
- Label: K-tel
- Producer: Bruce Welch

Cilla Black chronology
Modern Priscilla (1978)	Especially for You (1980)	Surprisingly Cilla (1985)

Especially for You is Cilla Black's eleventh solo studio album, released in 1980. This was her first recording project to be undertaken after the completion of her 15-year contract with the EMI group.

== Overview ==
The venture was notably produced by Bruce Welch for Cilla Black Ltd and licensed to K-tel International. Recording sessions for the album were held at the legendary Abbey Road Studios where Black had recorded many of her earlier hit singles. The album consisted of some of Black's favourite songs from the 1970s (or as she referred to them on the album sleeve "modern standards"). The TV-advertised album was eventually certified silver by the BPI having sold over 60,000 copies.

== Re-release ==
In 1988, the album was repackaged as Love Songs and released by K-tel International on CD format but was only available for a limited time as the label shutdown. The budget-label Pickwick Group then re-issued the album on CD in 2005, this release included the original artwork and title.

On 7 September 2009, K-Tel (UK) released a special edition of the album exclusively to digital download. This re-issue features all of the album's original recordings plus two rare bonus tracks which includes a rendition of The Beatles' song "The Fool on the Hill" and Black's 1980s TV theme tune "Surprise, Surprise". A digital booklet containing original album artwork, detailed track information and rare photographs was made available from iTunes with purchases of the entire album re-issue.

== Track listing ==
Side one

1. "Baby Don't Change Your Mind" (Van McCoy) – 3:03
2. "Sometimes When We Touch" (Dan Hill, Barry Mann) – 4:04
3. "Just the Way You Are" – 3:54 (Billy Joel)
4. "Talking in Your Sleep" (Roger Cook, Bobby Wood) – 3:03
5. "You Don't Bring Me Flowers" (Alan Bergman, Marilyn Bergman, Neil Diamond) – 3:15
6. "How Deep Is Your Love" (Barry Gibb, Robin Gibb, Maurice Gibb) – 3:51
7. "Bright Eyes" (Mike Batt) – 4:00
8. "Don't Cry for Me Argentina" (Andrew Lloyd Webber, Tim Rice) – 5:53

Side two

1. "When Will I See You Again" (Kenny Gamble, Leon Huff) – 2:58
2. "You Needed Me" (Randy Goodrum) – 3:27
3. "If You Leave Me Now" (Peter Cetera) – 4:05
4. "When I Need You" (Albert Hammond, Carole Bayer Sager) – 4:21
5. "Knowing Me, Knowing You" (Benny Andersson, Björn Ulvaeus, Stig Anderson) – 4:21
6. "Still" (Lionel Richie) – 5:09
7. "When a Child is Born" (Ciro Dammicco, Fred Jay) – 3:49
8. "Do That to Me One More Time" (Toni Tennille) – 4:02

== Credits ==
Personnel

- Lead vocals by Cilla Black
- Produced by Bruce Welch
- Arranged by Mike Moran
- Engineered by Peter Vince
- Album cover photograph by Dave Magnus

== Certifications ==
Region	Certification	Certified units/sales
United Kingdom (BPI)	Silver	60,000^{^}
^{^} Shipments figures based on certification alone.
