= Lena and Bonnie =

- TV Times March 25, 1978 to March 31, 1978
- Also known as: The Lena and Bonnie Easter Special; The Lena and Bonnie Show
- Genre: Musical
- Written by: Ken Hoare
- Directed by: John Kaye Cooper
- Starring: Lena Zavaroni; Bonnie Langford
- Narrated by: Robin Houston
- Opening theme: Compatibility
- Ending theme: Compatibility (instrumental)
- Composer: Alyn Ainsworth
- Country of origin: Great Britain
- Original language: English

Production
- Executive producer: David Bell
- Producer: John Kaye Cooper
- Production location: Kent House Studio
- Production company: London Weekend Television

Original release
- Release: March 26, 1978

On Sunday March 26, 1978 LWT broadcast Lena and Bonnie. It was a one-off special starring Lena Zavaroni and Bonnie Langford. It is also known as "The Lena and Bonnie Easter Special" or as "The Lena and Bonnie Show"

== Summary of Show ==
Part 1 of the show opens with Lena and Bonnie performing the song "Compatibility". Lena then perform a song and dance medley of disco music. Bonnie then performs a medley of show tunes, Lena and Bonnie then reprise the song "Compatibility" and it then goes to an advert break.

Part 2 of the show opens with Lena and Bonnie performing a reprise of the song "Compatibility". Lena & Bonnie then perform a medley of Shirley Temple and Judy Garland songs and "Shout". Lena then performs "Speedy Gonzales", after which Bonnie performs the song "I Can Do That". A medley of the songs "Boogie Woogie Bugle Boy" and "In The Mood" is then performed by Lena and Bonnie as the Compatibility Sisters. It then goes to another advert break.

Part 3 of the show opens with Lena and Bonnie performing a reprise of the song "Compatibility". Bonnie then performs the songs "New York, New York" and "Tomorrow", Lena then performs the songs "The Air That I Breathe" and "Should've Listened To Mama". Lena and Bonnie then reprise the song "Compatibility" which leads into the final song of the show, "Razzle Dazzle" from the musical Chicago.

== Production ==
When part 1 of the show was recorded the clapperboard information display the year 1977, When it was in fact 1978 on the recording of the show you can hear somebody off screen confirm the year as 1978.

Clapperboard Information

Part	Location	Show	Prod. No.	Date Rec.	Take
1	Kent House Studio	Lena And Bonnie Special	99182	January 17, 1978	1
2	Kent House Studio	Lena And Bonnie Special	99182	January 17, 1978	1
3	Kent House Studio	Lena and Bonnie Special.	99182	January 18, 1978	1
