= Fifty Years of Music =

- Genre: Music
- Country of origin: United Kingdom
- Original language: English
- No. of episodes: 1

Production
- Producer: Stewart Morris
- Production locations: BBC Television Centre, London
- Running time: 75 minutes
- Production company: BBC

Original release
- Network: BBC2 & BBC1
- Release: 6 November 1972

Fifty Years of Music was a one-off BBC Television production, broadcast to coincide with the BBC's Fiftieth Anniversary in 1972. Originally broadcast on BBC 2 on 6 November 1972, from 8:50 – 10:05pm, it was later repeated on BBC1 on 27 December 1972, at 5:45pm. The show was recorded in October 1972 at the BBC Television Centre and featured music from each of the five decades since the BBC's inception. The show's tagline was They Don't Write 'Em Like That Anymore!

The musical direction was provided by Alyn Ainsworth and the BBC Concert Orchestra. The Young Generation troupe provided dancing and vocal support, choreographed by Nigel Lythgoe

The artists taking part were:

Lulu, who performed songs from the 1920s. The 1930s were represented by Henry Hall with Alyn Ainsworth and the Orchestra recreating the big band sounds of the era. Vera Lynn and Cliff Richard sang hits from the 1940s, 1950s and 1960s, including many of their own chart successes, as well as other hits from the era. Gilbert O'Sullivan and The New Seekers covered the 1970s, while The New Seekers also performed a medley of songs from the 1950s to the 1970s, including songs by Nat King Cole, Perry Como, Teresa Brewer and The Everly Brothers. The show ended with all the participating acts singing parts of a song specially commissioned from Gilbert O'Sullivan, called "What Have We Got?"

The programme is listed as surviving in its complete form.
