= 100% (game show) =

1997 British TV game show

- Also known as: 100% Gold; 100% Sex
- Created by: Tom Atkinson
- Voices of: Robin Houston (original); Melinda Walker (100% Gold); Alex Leam (100% ABBA)
- Country of origin: United Kingdom
- Original language: English
- No. of episodes: 1030 (100% regular) and 438 (100% Gold)

Production
- Running time: 30 minutes (inc. adverts)
- Production company: Grundy Productions

Original release
- Network: Channel 5
- Release: 31 March 1997 – 24 December 2001

100% is a British television game show that was shown in the United Kingdom every weekday at 5.30pm from 31 March 1997, the day after the inception of its host television station Channel 5, until 24 December 2001, running for over 1,000 editions. Each show ran for 30 minutes with one commercial break. A Reg Grundy production, it was often billed as "The game show without a host", as viewers only saw the contestants, although a voiceover was provided by Robin Houston, who also presented One To Win, another daily quiz show on the same channel. He read the questions off-screen throughout the show and was never seen by the viewers nor, indeed, by the contestants. To keep production costs down, the shows were pre-recorded "as live" and in batches, normally over a weekend. The maximum number of shows that were recorded in one day was twelve, although the normal recording day saw ten shows being produced. There was a weekday afternoon spinoff series called 100% Gold which featured older contestants and was presented by Melinda Walker, plus a late-night series called 100% Sex which had questions of a more adult nature. An edition broadcast on Christmas Day 1997 about ABBA was presented by Alex Leam. All editions were recorded at Pearson Television's studios in Stephen Street, London.

In its original format, three players had three seconds to push buttons on the set corresponding to the multiple-choice answers of 100 general-knowledge questions.

During its run, a number of one-off specials were produced, usually to tie-in with a themed day or evening by the broadcaster, Channel 5.

Although pulling in reasonable ratings for the channel, it was dropped as part of a station revamp just before 2002.

== Scores ==
The original twist to the show was that, throughout the whole game, the players were told the individual scores (as a percentage of the number of questions answered correctly to that point), but not the player to whom those scores belonged. The scores were given to the contestants after 10, 30, 50, 60, 80, and all 100 questions had been asked, as a percentage of the number of questions they had correctly answered. They were also told whether there had been a change in the lead.

Later on, the rules were changed so that the players now knew who had which scores for the first 50 questions. In all cases, the audience could see who had what score and during the last ten questions the scores were displayed on screen after each answer.

=== Question fields ===
Originally, the format of the show was that 100 questions would be asked without an overall subject. In its later format, the subject would change every ten questions, with 1–10 and 81–100 being general knowledge. Every fifth question was a true or false question, and question 100 took the form of a ludicrous fact that was almost always true. In the case of a tie, a 101st question, always true or false, was asked, and the fastest player to give the right answer won. All questions, answer options, and correct answers were displayed on-screen for viewers to see.

=== Winnings ===
The person with the most questions answered correctly received the nominal sum of £100 and was invited to return as champion in the next show. The players did not speak at all during each episode, other than to state their names and towns at the start of the show (with the champion stating their occupation instead); the winner only responded whether he/she would be able to return.

== Transmissions ==
=== 100% ===
Series	Start date	End date	Episodes
1	31 March 1997	29 September 1997	131
2	30 September 1997	30 March 1998	127
3	31 March 1998	15 April 1999	255
4	16 April 1999	25 January 2000	177
5	26 January 2000	22 June 2000	105
6	23 June 2000	12 October 2000	64
7	13 October 2000	15 February 2001	65
8	16 February 2001	13 July 2001	106

==== Specials ====
Date	Entitle
29 June 1997	Prisoner: Cell Block H
18 September 1997	Chelsea Football Club
31 October 1997	Hallowe'en
4 November 1997	Aston Villa
20 December 1997	James Bond
24 December 1997	Christmas
25 December 1997	ABBA
13 February 1998	Valentine's
5 April 1998	Sci-Fi
13–17 July 1998	Challenge
2 August 1998	Accidents & Disasters
1998	Diana Princess of Wales
24–28 August 1998	Summer
4 October 1998	Triplets
5 December 1998	Disasters 2 – The Sequel
3 January 1999	Seventies Music
14 February 1999	Lovers
26 March 1999	Monsters
18 April 1999	Blondes
5 July 1999	Sci-Fi 2 – The Sequel
10 October 1999	ABBA – 1999
31 October 1999	Hallowe'en – 1999
10 March 2000	Drag
12 March 2000	Queen
1 May 2000	Elvis
7 June 2000	Stripped
22 August 2000	War
1 January 2001	Proof
25 February 2001	1970s
18 March 2001	1980s
21 March 2001	Bad Girls
26 August 2001	Harry Potter
2 September 2001	Rock
24 December 2001	Magic
Unaired	Crime

=== 100% Gold ===
Series	Start date	End date	Episodes
1	2 February 1998	5 May 1998	65
2	6 May 1998	26 March 1999	206
3	29 March 1999	31 December 1999	167

==== Specials ====
Date	Entitle
30 August 1999	Teen Idol
4–8 October 1999	Champions

=== 100% Sex ===
Series	Start date	End date	Episodes
Pilot	23 December 1998		1
1	24 June 1999	26 August 1999	10
2	29 June 2000	10 January 2001	24

==== Specials ====
Date	Entitle
21 December 1999	Boys Night Out
22 December 1999	Girls Night In
23 December 1999	Dragging It Up For Christmas

== International versions ==
Producer Pearson Television (Grundy's parent) brought the show to the United States in January 1999; originally hosted in the 1998 pilot by Mark Henning, the show went to series with Casey Kasem as host. This version offered $10 per correct answer, with a $99,000 bonus to any contestant who managed a perfect score (for a total of $100,000); it was never won during the show's brief run. The show, which aired on only seven stations (in Seattle, Washington; Columbus, Ohio; Dallas and Houston, Texas; Buffalo, New York; Jacksonville and Tampa, Florida) on a limited run, did not last a full season.

In Europe, the TV format was sold in France with the local version called 100 % question and in Italy with the same name of the original format.

Country	Name	Presenter(s)	Channel	Date of transmission
France	100 % question	Pascal Hernandez; Thierry Fréret; Julien Lepers (1st April 2004 episode)	La Cinquième/France 5	19 January 1998 – 27 August 2004
Italy	100%	Gigio D'Ambrosio	La 7	25 June 2001 – 30 August 2002
USA	100%	Mark Henning; Casey Kasem	American local TV channels	1998–1999

== See also ==
- Ian Lygo, a long-running contestant on the show
- Inquizition (a similar US game show that aired on GSN from 1998 to 2001)
