= The Faith Brown Chat Show =

- Title card
- Genre: Light Entertainment
- Written by: Dennis Berson; Garry Chambers; Ken Hoare
- Directed by: John Kaye Cooper
- Starring: Faith Brown
- Voices of: Robin Houston
- Country of origin: United Kingdom
- Original language: English
- No. of seasons: 1
- No. of episodes: 6

Production
- Executive producer: David Bell
- Production locations: South Bank Television Centre; London, United Kingdom
- Camera setup: Multi-camera
- Running time: 30 Minutes
- Production company: LWT

Original release
- Network: ITV
- Release: 26 January – 1 March 1980

Related
- The Faith Brown Awards

The Faith Brown Chat Show is a short-lived comedy series featuring the British impressionist and singer, Faith Brown. Broadcast in the United Kingdom in 1980, the series was a mix of songs and celebrity impressions. Only 6 episodes were produced, by London Weekend Television (LWT).

== Background and Development ==
The series was commissioned by Michael Grade, Director of Programmes at LWT, following the success of the one-off special, The Faith Brown Awards, which had attracted an audience of 9.8 million viewers when it was broadcast in 1978 .
