= Surprisingly Cilla =

Studio album by Cilla Black
- Released: 7 October 1985
- Recorded: 1985
- Label: Towerbell
- Producer: David Mackay

Cilla Black chronology
Especially for You (1980)	Surprisingly Cilla (1985)	Cilla's World (1990)

Singles from Surprisingly Cilla
- 1. "There's a Need in Me" Released: September 1985; 2. "Surprise Surprise" Released: December 1985

Surprisingly Cilla is the title of Cilla Black's twelfth solo studio album. It was a spin-off from her television series, Surprise, Surprise, and the opening track is the show's theme tune. The album includes several re-recordings of Black's hit singles, originally recorded in the 1960s.

The album was conceived primarily as an attempt to capitalise on the success of the television series, which had drawn high ratings for ITV. Black was re-united with her former EMI producer David Mackay, but unlike their previous collaborations, neither he nor Black were given any creative control over the project.

Although Black heavily promoted the album and its two singles, they failed to chart. Some months after the album's release, Towerbell Records shut down and no further copies of the album were released.

== Re-release ==
In 2003, there were plans to re-issue the album on CD until it was discovered that the master tapes for the project had been lost. The re-issue project was therefore abandoned.

== Track listing ==
Side A

1. "Surprise Surprise" (Kate Robbins)
2. "I Know Him So Well" (Benny Andersson, Tim Rice)
3. "You're My World (Il Mio Mondo)" (Umberto Bindi, Gino Paoli, Carl Sigman) (Previously recorded in 1964)
4. "One More Night" (Phil Collins)
5. "There's a Need in Me" (Doreen Chanter)
6. "Conversations" (Roger Greenaway, Roger Cook, Jerry Lordan) (Previously recorded in 1969)

Side B

1. "Step Inside Love" (John Lennon, Paul McCartney) (Previously recorded in 1967)
2. "We're in This Love Together" (Roger Murrah, Keith Stegall)
3. "I See Forever in Your Eyes" (Bob McDill)
4. "Put Your Heart Where Your Love is" (Rick Palomibi, Denny Henson)
5. "That's Already Taken" (A.Corrie)
6. "You've Lost That Lovin' Feelin'" (Barry Mann, Cynthia Weil) (Previously recorded in 1965)

== Credits ==
Personnel

- Lead Vocals - Cilla Black
- Producer - David Mackay
- Arranged - David Mackay, Allan Rogers and David Cullen
- Keyboards - Allan Rogers, Danny Schogger and David Mackay
- Bass - Paul Townsend
- Guitars - Tim Renwick
- Drums - Graham Jarvis and Tom Nichol
- Saxophone - Andy Mackintosh
- Artwork - Ian Hooton
