= Doctor in Distress (song) =

Single by Who Cares?
- B-side: "Doctor in Distress" (Instrumental)
- Released: March 1985
- Genre: Pop, hi-NRG
- Label: Record Shack
- Songwriters: Fiachra Trench, Ian Levine
- Producers: Fiachra Trench, Ian Levine

"Doctor in Distress" is a pop song related to the BBC television programme Doctor Who. It was released as an ensemble charity single in 1985.

== Background ==
In 1985, when production of the series was suspended for 18 months and it looked as if it faced cancellation, a charity single was produced and released in March. It was written by Ian Levine and freelancer Fiachra Trench, who had previously collaborated on the theme music for the TV pilot K-9 and Company, a Doctor Who spin-off from 1981.

When the single was announced in early March, it was rumoured that the recording session would include the Village People alongside Doctor Who fans Elton John and Holly Johnson. This, however, did not occur. Instead, organisers Paul Mark Tams and Jeff Weston (managing director of Record Shack) secured 25 performers, some of whom were attached to Weston's label. The resulting supergroup recorded the single under the name Who Cares?, with the participation of four regulars from the TV series: Colin Baker (the Sixth Doctor), Nicola Bryant (companion Peri Brown), Nicholas Courtney (recurring character Brigadier Lethbridge-Stewart) and Anthony Ainley (the Master).

== Reception ==
The single, which was released on Friday 15 March 1985, was universally panned and failed to chart in the UK. The BBC refused to broadcast the song on the grounds of poor quality. Levine himself later told The Guardian, "It was an absolute balls-up fiasco. It was pathetic and bad and stupid. It tried to tell the Doctor Who history in an awful high-energy song. It almost ruined me."

An accompanying video was also released. This was directed by Keith Barnfather of Reeltime Pictures, a film production company that specialised in Doctor Who-related projects, including documentaries and spin-off video dramas. More than two decades later, the video for the single was included as a special feature on Disc Four of The Trial of a Time Lord DVD boxed set. In the documentary Trials & Tribulations included on the same disc, Levine admitted that it had been conceived by John Nathan-Turner's partner Gary Downie "in a drunken moment".

== Personnel ==
In addition to the four Doctor Who regulars mentioned above, the recording session, and the accompanying video, included the following:

- Earlene Bentley
- Faith Brown (comedienne and actress)
- Miquel Brown
- Warren Cann from Ultravox
- Hazell Dean
- Floid Pearce from Hot Gossip
- Bobby G from Bucks Fizz
- Jona Lewie
- Hans Zimmer
- Phyllis Nelson
- Richie Pitts from the cast of the stage musical Starlight Express
- John Rocca from Freeez
- Sally Thomsett (actress)
- David Van Day from Dollar
- Members of Matt Bianco (Basia Trzetrzelewska and Danny White)
- Members of the Moody Blues (Justin Hayward and John Lodge)
- Members of Tight Fit (Steven Grant and Julie Harris)
- Members of Time UK (Rick Buckler, Ronnie Ball, Fletcher Christian, Jimmy Edwards, Ray Simone and Nick Smith)
