= Robin Houston =

Voiceover artist, former announcer and television newsreader

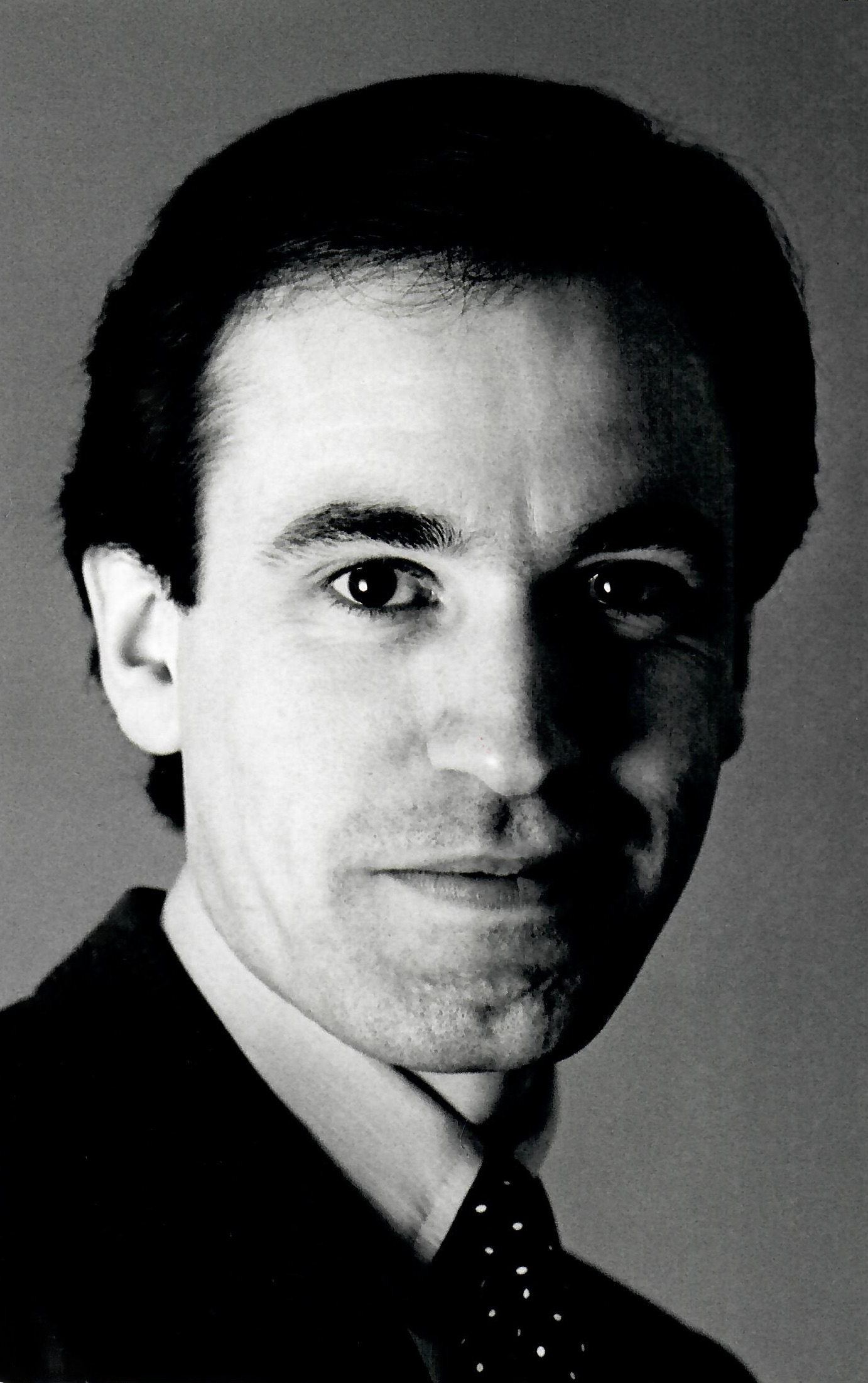
- 1982 Houston in 1982
- Born: 1947 (age 78–79); London
- Occupations: Voiceover artist, news presenter, radio personality, television presenter and game show host
- Years active: 1967–present

Robin Houston (born London, 1947) is a British voiceover artist and former announcer, radio and television newsreader and quiz show host. After starting his career as an announcer and stage manager, he became one of the pioneers of commercial radio in the United Kingdom. He went on to read the news on television for 15 years and to become one of the most well known announcers in television entertainment. For many years he was a host of television quiz shows, and is now a veteran voiceover artist with over 50 years' experience in the field.

== Early career ==
Voice work as a teenager in audio drama led him to drama school where he trained in stage management and audio production under the tutelage of Dorothy Tenham and on graduation was encouraged to become a freelance voice-over artist. He joined theatrical producers John Hewer, Mike Hall and Gervase Farjeon in the West End of London working for five years as announcer, production manager, stage manager, and audiovisual director on stage productions, variety shows, cabarets, films, international conferences and product launches in London, the rest of the UK and much of Western Europe. In that time he also worked part-time as a personal assistant to the British bandleader Henry Hall.

== Radio ==
In October 1973 he became a founding presenter and producer at Capital Radio in London, one of the first two commercial radio stations in the United Kingdom, broadcasting from their studios at Euston Tower. There he read the weekend news bulletins and served as one of the producers of the daily news magazine programme London's Day. At the beginning of 1974 Capital revamped its programming and he became Capital's senior newsreader, presenting morning bulletins in the new Kenny Everett Breakfast Show and the Tommy Vance and Michael Aspel programmes. In October 1974, with other leading Capital presenters, he joined in recording the 1st anniversary single which was freely distributed to listeners. In the same month he took over the position of News Editor in addition to his newsreading duties. November 1974 saw Capital Radio close down its newsroom for financial reasons (causing 12 journalists to be made redundant) and he moved to LBC, the UK's first commercial radio station, broadcasting from studios in Gough Square, off Fleet Street in the City of London.

There he became a newsreader for Independent Radio News and a daytime news programme presenter for LBC while acting as a relief presenter on LBC's breakfast show, AM. In the late summer of 1975 he took over the station's early evening classical music show and the late-night phone-in and arts interview duties, presenting Robin Houston's Nightline At the start of 1976 he became LBC's daily drive time presenter on Newsbreak, a combination of news, features and arts interviews. Expressing a desire to move into television, he ceased working full-time for LBC at the end of 1976.

While still presenting occasionally for LBC and making early appearances on television, from 1977 to 1979 he became a regular music presenter on the BBC World Service radio channel, broadcasting from Bush House in London, on The Robin Houston Request Show, Sounds International and Anything Goes.

== Television news ==
For over 14 years, from September 1978, he presented the lunchtime bulletins of Thames News on Thames Television, covering the ITV region of London and the home counties. From April 1980 he also presented the nightly late Thames News bulletins, broadcast immediately after News at Ten.

He continued to be seen twice-daily on Thames News until the end of Thames Television's contract in December 1992. He read over 5,500 news bulletins in that time.

In the early 1980s he also regularly voiced the nightly United Press International Television News relay from London for television stations around the world.

== Television entertainment ==
He was one of very few broadcasters to work for both the Thames Television and London Weekend Television franchises at the same time. While presenting Thames News on weekdays he was also an in-vision continuity announcer and promotions voiceover for London Weekend Television from 1977 to 1979 and for 15 years he was the voiceover announcer for the majority of the entertainment and awards shows produced by LWT between 1977 and 1992. As such he established a style and expertise appropriate for the time which has since been much copied, but seldom matched. In the same period, and until 1997, he also announced entertainment and awards programmes for Thames Television, for a number of other ITV companies and for BBC Television.

As an announcer he provided the voiceovers for over 850 ITV television shows:

- All Star Secrets
- An Audience with...
- Aspel & Company
- Bruce Forsyth's Big Night
- BAFTA Awards
- The Cannon and Ball Show
- The Children's Royal Variety Performance
- Child's Play
- The Dame Edna Experience
- Dame Edna Kisses It Better
- Des O'Connor Tonight
- Evening Standard British Film Awards
- Evening Standard Theatre Awards
- The Faith Brown Awards
- The Faith Brown Chat Show
- A Gala Evening With Victor Borge
- Game for a Laugh
- The Goodies
- The Ken Goodwin Show
- The Krankies Klub
- Lena & Bonnie
- The National Television Awards
- Newlyweds
- A Night of 100 Stars
- A Night on Mount Edna
- Play Your Cards Right
- Pot of Gold
- The Prince's Trust Galas
- Punchlines
- The Pyramid Game
- Royal Film Performance
- Royal Variety Performance
- The Russ Abbot Show
- Sale of the Century
- Search For A Star
- The Stanley Baxter Series
- Strike It Lucky
- Surprise Surprise
- Tarby & Friends
- Tell the Truth
- The Unrecorded Jasper Carrot
- We Love TV

For BBC Television he also announced Clive James' New Year specials and Dame Edna Live at the Palace.

From March 1997 as a voice-only presenter he launched the daily half-hour-long quiz show 100% on five days a week for the new television station Channel 5. He made 1100 shows over several contiguous series for a period of nearly 5 years, pulling in good ratings for the channel, but the show was finally dropped at the end of 2001 as part of a station revamp. For financial reasons no editing time was available, so shows had to be transmission-ready at the end of each recording. A normal recording day saw 10 shows being made, but on one day a record number of 12 shows was recorded.

He also recorded 35 100% specials and 38 late-night versions of the show. He asked over 117,000 questions during the show's run.

From May 2000 he also took over as in-vision host of an additional daily half-hour Channel 5 quiz show One to Win. This also had good ratings and ran to 208 shows over two series.

== Actor ==
As an actor he starred with Sir John Mills and Dame Peggy Ashcroft in the 1986 animated film When the Wind Blows in which he played the radio announcer warning of a nuclear attack. He was The Newsreader in the London debut of Angels in America at the National Theatre in the early 1990s. He also played the newsreader in Kenny Everett's science fiction radio and television serial Captain Kremmen and has performed in a number of film and television dramas, including Something Wicked This Way Comes, The Custard Boys, Kavanagh QC, Thursday the 12th, Holby City, Dempsey and Makepeace and The Gentle Touch. He has also performed in several television situation comedies, including A Fine Romance, Nobody's Perfect, No Problem! and Two's Company.

== Other work ==
As well as his broadcast work, since 1967 he has voiced and presented commercials, conferences and conventions, training and internal communication films, product launches and awards ceremonies. Major clients have included IBM, Campaign magazine, BMW, the Royal College of Nursing and Volvo Cars.

He has also narrated over 100 audiobooks for the Talking Book service of the Royal National Institute of Blind People, for Listening Books' Sound Learning educational initiative and for other publishers.

Throughout his life he has written casual articles and occasional obituaries for a wide variety of newspapers and magazines, including The Guardian, The Independent and The Oldie and five of his audio dramas—A Bark of the Fox, Essay on Betrayal, The Trumpet in the Hall, Peter in the Sky, and an adaptation of Godfrey Smith's novel The Business of Loving—have been produced by BBC Radio 4.

He is an alumnus of the Royal Academy of Dramatic Art and a Long Service member of the British actors' union Equity.
