= Olly Pike =

British author and YouTube star (born 1986)

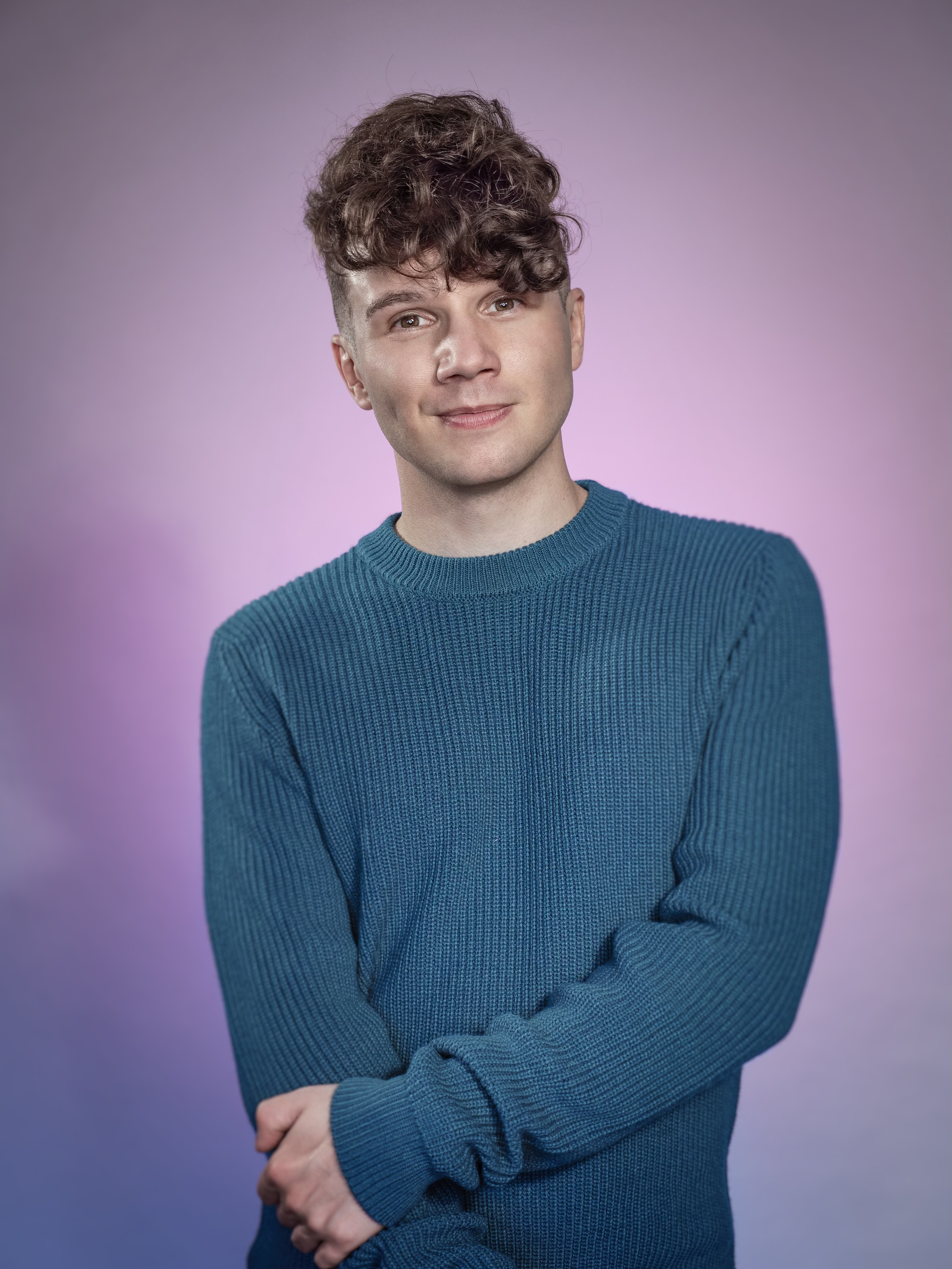
- Pike in 2021
- Born: 28 March 1986 (age 39)
- Occupations: Author, actor, YouTuber
- Years active: 2007–present

Olly Pike (born 28 March 1986) is a British author, actor, and YouTube star. He is the creator of Pop'n'Olly Ltd and the author of multiple LGBT+ children's books. Starting out by running LGBT+ workshops within schools, his content and resources are now regularly used by schools and charities as part of their diversity and inclusion practises. To date, Pike has distributed over 30,000 copies of his books to children, parents and teachers around the world, collaborating with major brands to help him reach his goals. The Pop'n'Olly YouTube channel has received over 4.5 million views.

In 2015, Pike was named as one to watch in The Independent's Rainbow List. Placing LGBT+ inclusivity at the heart of his work, he believes that it is his "responsibility to create a safe space for young readers to explore and imagine. A place for them to feel welcome and accepted."

== Career ==
Olly Pike portrayed "Wiley Sneak" in the CBBC show Trapped!.

== Awards and nominations ==
Year	Award	Category	Result
2021	Attitude Awards	Pride Award	Won

== Bibliography ==
- Olly Pike (2015). Prince Henry. Oliver Pike. ISBN 978-0-9933407-4-1.
- Olly Pike (2015). Jamie. Oliver Pike. ISBN 978-0-9933407-3-4.
- Olly Pike (2016). Princess Penny & The Pea. Oliver Pike. ISBN 978-0-9933407-5-8.
- Olly Pike (2018). The Prince and The Frog. Jessica Kingsley Publishers. ISBN 978-1-78592-382-1.
- Olly Pike (2018). Goldilocks and the Five Bear Families. Oliver Pike. ISBN 978-0-9933407-6-5.
- Olly Pike (2019). Kenny Lives With Erica and Martina. Oliver Pike. ISBN 978-0-9933407-7-2.
- Olly Pike (2021). What does LGBT+ Mean?. Oliver Pike. ISBN 978-0-9933407-8-9.
- Olly Pike (2022). Little Red Riding Dude. Oliver Pike. ISBN 978-0-9933407-9-6.
