= 3-2-1 =

British television game show (1978–1988)

- The original title card, used from 1978–83.
- Based on: Un, dos, tres... responda otra vez by Narciso Ibáñez Serrador
- Presented by: Ted Rogers
- Starring: Booby Prize Dusty Bin Comedy regulars: Debbie Arnold Felix Bowness; Duggie Brown; Bernie Clifton; Chris Emmett; David Ismay; Mike Newman; George Roper; Hostesses: Mireille Allonville; Fiona Curzon; Karan David; Annie St. John; Jenny Layland; Lynda Lee Lewis; Wei Wei Wong; Caroline Munro; Karen Palmer; Gail Playfair; Libby Roberts; Patsy Ann Scott; Alison Temple-Savage; Tula
- Announcer: Anthony Schaeffer; John Benson
- Country of origin: United Kingdom
- Original language: English
- No. of series: 10
- No. of episodes: 141 (inc. 12 specials)

Production
- Running time: 60 minutes (inc. adverts)
- Production company: Yorkshire Television

Original release
- Network: ITV
- Release: 29 July 1978 – 24 December 1988

3–2–1 is a British game show that was made by Yorkshire Television for ITV. It ran for ten years, from 29 July 1978 to 24 December 1988, with Ted Rogers as the host.

It was based on a Spanish game show called Un, dos, tres... responda otra vez and was a trio of three shows in one: a quiz, variety and a game show.

The show was a huge success, consistently pulling in large ratings. The first series, though intended as a summer filler, attracted up to 16.5 million viewers and subsequent years never peaked below 12 million. The show occupied a Saturday early evening slot for most of its run.

The final Christmas special, broadcast on 24 December 1988, attracted 12.5 million viewers, but an eleventh series was not commissioned. Ted Rogers said in an April 1996 interview that "The Oxbridge lot got control of TV and they didn't really want it. It was too downmarket for them. We were still getting 12 million viewers when they took it off after ten years. These days if a show gets nine million everyone does a lap of honour."

== The format ==
The overall objective of the game was to survive elimination through to part three of the show, and try to unravel a series of cryptic clues to win the star prize. However, one of the clues referred to "Dusty Bin", the show's booby prize; any contestants who wound up with Dusty at the end of the show received only a new dustbin. Each show had a theme, such as "Sea cruise" or the "Swinging Sixties". All of the variety acts, quiz questions, stage sets and clues subsequently followed this theme. In later series, Dusty would appear at the start of the show dressed in a costume relating to that week's theme. The changing themes were dropped for the final series where a more generic stage set was re-used each week.

=== Part 1: The 1,000-to-1 quiz ===
In part one of the show, three couples had the chance to win up to £1,000 in the "1,000 to 1 quiz". The first round consisted of a maximum of 10 questions in 30 seconds, each correct answer being worth £10 in the first round (or in the first series £1, but with three rounds available). Passes were permitted but there was no opportunity to return to the question. Each member of the couple answered in turn with the woman answering first and the first answer was given to her to avoid the possibility of a zero score. An incorrect answer, or the time limit, would immediately end the round. Each correct answer in the second round was worth the total amount scored in the first, hence the need to avoid a zero score which would have meant a couple were playing for nothing.

The questions were usually of the same 'word association' format. Ted Rogers would say, for example, an island and the contestants would have to name the country to which it belonged (e.g. Ted: "Gozo", Contestant: "Malta"). Another example would be songs and the artist or group who made it (e.g. Ted: "Never Say Die", Contestant: Cliff Richard).

In the first series, the winners of the quiz would return the following week to compete again, while the other two couples would progress to part two, but from the second series, this changed to the worst-performing couple being eliminated, taking home the money they won in the quiz and a ceramic model of Dusty Bin.

Dusty Bin was conceived as the booby prize by the show's producer Derek Burrell-Davis and created as a cartoon character by the designer and animator John Sunderland, who also designed the opening and end titles and the themed 'costumes' for Dusty Bin.

In the final series (1987–1988), the 1,000-to-1 quiz was replaced by a general-knowledge, fingers-on-buzzers quiz. As before, three couples participated, in just two rounds of questions. Each couple began with £10 and could earn another £10 for each correct answer in the first round. The first round required ten correct answers (in other words, the round would not end if ten questions had been read out and not all answered correctly). As soon as Rogers started to ask the question, the couple who hit the buzzer first, after Rogers had said their name, had three seconds to answer the question, and if they failed to answer the question in three seconds, or answered the question wrong, Rogers would say "On Offer" and the other two couples would have a chance to answer the question. Again, the couple who hit the buzzer first, after Rogers had said their name, had three seconds to answer, and if they failed to answer the question in three seconds, or answer the question wrong, that question would go into the bin.

Following the first round, Rogers would give the couples a break during which he introduced a "newcomer" to 3–2–1 (another addition to the final series). This was a chance for an act to perform, much like the later rounds as normal, though, the "newcomer" had never appeared on 3–2–1 before. Following the newcomer act, round two of the quiz would be played, with only fifteen questions been asked. As with previous series, whatever money the couples had after the first round would be the value of the question to them in the second round, and it was the same format for answering the questions. The maximum a couple could win in this round was £1,650 (as in the starting £10, ten first-round questions answered correctly plus all fifteen in the second round), however, this was never achieved. At the end of the two rounds of questions, the couple with the least money would leave with the money they had won and their ceramic Dusty Bin, before a commercial break. On the 1987 and 1988 Christmas specials, the quiz only consisted of 20 questions worth £100.

=== Part 2: The elimination ===
The elimination mechanism for reducing the remaining couples down to one changed over the course of the show. In the first two series, it was a physical game to fit in with the show's theme. This changed in 1981 to the contestants competing head to head in a computer game (such as Breakout), and was finally amended in 1982 to an elimination question which the last two couples would answer after seeing the first three variety acts in part two of the show. The commercial break followed the question, and in 1986 and 1987, a viewers' question was posed to win a colour television, with three runners up getting a ceramic Dusty Bin. The entry form for that was in that week's edition of TV Times.

=== Part 3: The acts and prize clues ===
In the early years, the third round was referred to as Take it or Leave it?. The final version of the show's format was amended in 1982 so that from the beginning of part two of the show, the two remaining couples from the quiz watched the first three variety acts together. At the end of each act, one of the performers would come over to the table and give Rogers a clue object (or MacGuffin as Rogers sometimes called them) and read a corresponding rhyme to provide clues for that particular prize.

After three acts, the couples would decide on which object they would like to reject in the hope that it was Dusty Bin, after hearing the first two rhymes again and then take part in the final elimination question. The losers would leave with the money they had won in part one, their ceramic Dusty Bin and a consolation prize (such as a twelve-piece dinner service) and the winners would go through to part three of the show.

In the first series there were six items brought to the table however this was revised down to five from the second series.

At the beginning of part three, Rogers would decode the clue and reveal the prize which the final couple rejected before the end of part two. Another act would then perform and leave another clue, leaving three on the table. Rogers would then re-read one of the earlier two clues, before the couple chose their second item to reject before that prize was then revealed to them. The final variety act would perform and leave a last clue. Rogers would then re-read one of the previous clues and the couple would reject their third item, and another prize was then revealed. Rogers would then re-read the remaining two clues and the couple would be faced with their final decision leaving them with the prize they have chosen and ultimately won, after seeing what the other prize they had rejected was, and also with the prize they had won, they had the money they won in part one of the show. Unlike the eliminated couples, the winning couple did not receive a ceramic Dusty Bin, unless they had Dusty at the end of the show, all they got was a brand new dustbin, the money they won in part one and a ceramic Dusty Bin. As well as Dusty Bin, which was always one of the five prizes, the other four prizes normally included a car and a holiday. Later series sometimes featured two cars as prizes.

The clues became notorious for being very difficult and obscure, having only a remote connection to the prizes, which contestants sometimes did not appear to grasp even after Rogers had revealed it to them. It has often been suggested that the clues had more than one possible explanation, allowing the producers to control which prize the contestants received. Indeed, in one episode, Rogers jokingly said to confused contestants, attempting to make a decision: "well, the rhymes could mean anything, as you know."

== Acts who appeared on the show ==
The early series of the programme featured a regular cast of comedy performers including Chris Emmett, Mike Newman, Felix Bowness, Debbie Arnold and Duggie Brown. This format was changed for later series when each show featured a number of variety acts of the day as well as a house dance troupe such as the Brian Rogers Connection who would perform solos for the first act. They would later often dance behind the acts who would invariably top the bill. Previous dance/hostess troupes who appeared include Lipstick (choreographed by hostess Libby Roberts) and the Gentle Secs.

Other hostesses who appeared on the show include: Mireille Allonville, Jenny Layland, Patsy Ann Scott, Annie St John, Karen Palmer, Gail Playfair, Tula, Alison Temple-Savage, Libby Roberts, Fiona Curzon, Karan David, Wei Wei Wong, Caroline Munro and Lynda Lee Lewis.

Acts who appeared included: Gloria Gaynor, George Roper, Ken Dodd, Charlie Williams, Bonnie Langford, Duncan Norvelle, Black Lace, Bernie Winters, Wall Street Crash, Kiki Dee, Michael Ball, 'Nasty Nigel' Lythgoe, Fay Presto, Pete Price, Manhattan Transfer, Shane Richie, Stan Boardman, Fascinating Aida, Showaddywaddy, Kajagoogoo, Frankie Howerd, Colm Wilkinson, Wilfrid Brambell from Steptoe and Son, Sinitta, Five Star, Cheryl Baker, Phil Cornwell, Jaki Graham, Nana Mouskouri, the Chuckle Brothers, Brian Conley, Roy Walker, the Drifters, John Sparkes, Wayne Sleep, Andrew O'Connor, Gareth Hunt, Peter Beckett, Syd Lawrence (with his orchestra), Humphrey Lyttelton, Frankie Vaughan, Jessica Martin, Mud, Keith Harris and Orville, Mick Miller, Diane Solomon, Tony Christie, Cover Girls, Lyn Paul, the Searchers, the Rockin' Berries, Stephanie Lawrence, Don Lusher (with his band), Madeline Bell, Georgie Fame, Wayne Dobson, the Real Thing, Rebecca Storm, Richard Digance, Anna Dawson, Marion Montgomery, Bill Maynard, the Krankies, Terry Scott, Carmel McSharry, Bob Carolgees, Diana Dors, Lionel Blair, Alvin Stardust, Phil Cool, Vince Eager, Mike Reid, Nicholas Parsons, Sheila Steafel, Danny La Rue, Les Dennis, The Wurzels, Joan Benham, Ken Colyer (with his jazzmen), Frazer Hines, Charlie Williams, Pan's People (as Dee Dee Wilde's Pan's People), Rita Webb, The Great Soprendo, Bernard Bresslaw, Charlie Drake, Aimi MacDonald, Mark Heap (the Two Marks), Vince Hill and Paul Da Vinci.

As was the style of the day, the show often featured speciality acts such as a female singer who sang unconvincing renditions of popular songs whilst her male partner sketched caricatures of famous people connected with the song on a flip chart (e.g. a sketch of Marilyn Monroe was drawn whilst the Elton John song Candle in the Wind was performed) who were Trevillion and (Sadie) Nine. The other songs performed were Smile (Though, Your Heart is Breaking), Eye of the Tiger accompanied by sketches of Charlie Chaplin and a boxer. The prize announcers were: Anthony Schaeffer (1984–1985) and later John Benson (1986–87), who had provided the famous voice-over for Sale of the Century.

The Christmas editions of the show sometimes featured celebrities in place of regular contestants. The first Christmas show for 1978 (but broadcast in January 1979 due to industrial action at YTV) featured three celebrity partners, paired according to their fields of work, with Pat Coombs and Julian Orchard (comedy), Terry Wogan and Clodagh Rodgers (pop music), and Mick Channon and Rachael Heyhoe-Flint (sport). Wogan and Rodgers went through to the final. The pair eliminated the five prizes available for charity, becoming the series' first contestants to end up with Dusty Bin, much to their embarrassment. However, as it was a Christmas special, Dusty Bin contained a cheque for £2,000 for their chosen charity, along with a donation of £3,000 from YTV for a Variety Club Sunshine Coach for a local special educational needs school.

The 1983 Christmas edition featured teenagers as contestants playing for local charities in England, Wales and Northern Ireland, with a representative from Scotland in the audience receiving an average total from the teams' quiz earnings for their charity. The winning team ended up with Dusty Bin, but this was revealed to be the star prize, meaning all four charities won their prizes.

In the 1984 Christmas edition, the teams were Barbara Windsor and John Inman, Anita Harris and Bernie Winters, and Suzanne Dando and Bernie Clifton. Windsor and Inman were the winners, but they too won Dusty Bin; however on this occasion, the prizes were all revealed to be booby prizes, and again Dusty Bin was the star prize. Windsor and Inman were aware of the set up and deliberately contrived to win the dustbin.

Future radio broadcaster Janice Long appeared as a contestant on the first episode with her then husband, Trevor.

== Hand gesture ==
Ted Rogers would regularly make a lightning fast 3–2–1 hand gesture. This became an important gimmick of the show – and a school playground favourite – mainly because it was quite difficult to do, and resulted in a rude hand gesture if performed incorrectly. The correct way of doing the gesture is to hold up three fingers (index, middle, and ring) on the right hand, facing inward; two (index and middle) facing outward; and then one (index) facing inward, turning the wrist while changing the fingers.

== Dusty Bin ==
Dusty Bin was both the show's mascot and its booby prize. Dusty would appear at the start of each show, dressed in the style of that week's theme (except in the 1987 series, which had no theme).

The cartoon character of Dusty Bin was created by freelance designer John Sunderland, who developed the character based on the show producers' brief for a booby prize which would work on the British version of the show. The original Spanish version had a pumpkin as a booby prize. Sunderland's concept for the shows' original titles, which were shown on the original series, included the birth of the bin. The character came to life as Yorkshire Television's chevron logo falls to earth after shooting up into the sky like a rocket above the studios, exploding in a dustbin standing by the studio's stage door. The bin contained a clown's costume, parts of which become one with the bin, bringing it to life as the character Dusty Bin; part dustbin, part clown, all enduring iconic character.

The original robotic Dusty Bin, and his Yorkshire Terrier dog Garbage, was put together by Ian Rowley, in his converted chapel workshop in Rodley, Leeds. He used over 73 microprocessors, which was cutting edge 1980s remote control robotic technology in that day, at a cost around £10,000 to manufacture – which was a small fortune in those days – to control Dusty and Garbage, and in 151 shows, some of Dusty's & Garbage's antics included dressing up as a caveman and dinosaur, bullfighting as a matador and bull, dressing up as a baby, driving into the studio in a Ford Model T, juggling balls like a clown, playing the piano like Elton John, flying round the studio with a James Bond jetpack, escaping from chains like Harry Houdini, riding a bike, spraying Ted Rogers with paint and even driving a tank into the studio, to bomb the audience with confetti. There were three Dustys made in total: one, which is fully robotic, is with the creator Ian Rowley; another is greeting people at the ITV studio entrance; and the third is owned by Ted Rogers' son Danny.

== In popular culture ==
In 1999, as part of their Christmas special entitled "The Phantom Millennium"; French and Saunders included Dusty Bin in a parody of Star Wars: Episode I – The Phantom Menace; where Dusty Bin played Droid DB-321. Dawn French makes the 3–2–1 "hand signal" whilst she commands the droid in the guise of Queen Amanana (A parody of Queen Amidala). Also, as part of Comic Relief 2007, the BBC showed a short sketch based around The Proclaimers' 1988 song "I'm Gonna be (500 Miles)". Directed by and starring Peter Kay, it featured Dusty Bin dancing with a gaggle of forgotten celebrities from the 1960s, 1970s and 1980s. The song was released as a CD single and DVD. Dusty also appeared briefly in a robot-themed chapter of the webcomic Scary Go Round.

The Class 321 trains were nicknamed 'Dusty Bins' due to the number bearing the same name as the game show, and class 153 unit number 153 321 is also affectionately known as 'Dusty Bin' by train crews because of its number. The Airbus A321 is also nicknamed 'Dusty Bin' due to the type bearing the same name as the show.

The Burkiss Way, a radio comedy show which co-starred 3-2-1 regular Chris Emmett, parodied the show with a sketch involving a final clue of "It's a dustbin and not a car.", which was revealed to be an anagram of "It's a car and not a dustbin." and thus by rejecting it, the contestants had turned down winning a new car.

Another parody was performed on Russ Abbot's Madhouse, in which the show was named 1-2-3. The host - played by Les Dennis - presents as the final clue a suitcase and the rhyme: "I pack my bags to go on one, and stay in a nice hotel, and see the sun shine through the palm trees; this a travel agent might sell." The eager contestants (Russ Abbot and Bella Emberg) pick this prize, certain it will be the holiday... It turns out to be the bin.

In the Artic text adventure game "Planet of Death" that was made for all major 8 bit computers in the early 80s, 3-2-1 was a major clue towards the end of the game. When the character got past the force field, they entered a room that contained their ship and the lift that would take them off the planet. However, the lift is unpowered so on some further exploration the character comes across another room in which, there are 3 switches and the clue reads – "3,2,1 – No Dusty, Bin Rules.".

The two time (Scottish) BAFTA award-winning jester and pro-gamer Brian “Limmy” Limond regularly analyses old episodes of the show on his Twitch stream.

== DVD game ==
An interactive DVD version of 3–2–1 was released by Universal in 2007. Hosted by Dusty Bin (though, Rogers appears in series clips used for the game), it offers both questions from original broadcasts and current ones.

== The prizes ==
3–2–1 become notorious for some unconventional, cheap, and tacky prizes it awarded to winners. For instance, couples won only a brand new metal dustbin if the final clue revealed was "Dusty Bin". A pet dog was also awarded. Episode 1 featured a St. Bernard and a year's supply of brandy. This was rejected by Janice Long and her then husband Trevor. Other less extravagant prizes have included: a sofa that turns into a pool table, gold nuggets, a share in a racehorse, a family set of folding bicycles, a year's supply of fish, and matching 'his and hers' sheepskin coats.

== Transmissions ==
=== Series ===
Series	Start date	End date	Episodes
1	29 July 1978	20 October 1978	13
2	24 October 1979	5 April 1980	14
3	3 January 1981	4 April 1981	14
4	30 January 1982	1 May 1982	14
5	29 January 1983	14 May 1983	15
6	3 December 1983	17 March 1984	15
7	1 September 1984	15 December 1984	16
8	31 August 1985	14 December 1985	16
9	30 August 1986	15 November 1986	12
10	5 September 1987	21 November 1987	12

=== Specials ===
Date	Entitle
25 December 1978	Christmas Special
25 December 1979	Christmas Special
25 December 1980	Christmas Special
2 January 1982	New Year Special
25 December 1982	Christmas Special
24 December 1983	Christmas Special
22 December 1984	Christmas Special
21 December 1985	Christmas Special
21 December 1986	Christmas Special
19 December 1987	Christmas Special
3 September 1988	Olympic Special
24 December 1988	Christmas Special
