= Ian Lygo =

British Quiz Show Winner

Ian J. Lygo is a British civil servant from Hemel Hempstead, who made 75 appearances on the UK game show 100% in late 1998, with the 75th appearance occurring on 14 December of that year. Since he won £100 for each game, his total winnings were £7,500.

Despite the popular belief that American game show contestant Ken Jennings holds the record for longest winning streak (winning 74 games on U.S. quiz show Jeopardy!), it is Lygo who actually holds the record for longest winning streak on a game show worldwide, as he won 75 games. Lygo is the first contestant to accomplish such a streak, as Jennings' appearance on Jeopardy! did not take place until 2004.
