= Surprise Surprise (British TV series) =

British light entertainment television programme

- Revival show's title card (2015)
- Also known as: Cilla's Surprise Surprise!
- Genre: Light entertainment
- Presented by: Cilla Black (1984–2001); Holly Willoughby (2012–2015)
- Starring: Christopher Biggins (1984); Bob Carolgees (1985–1995); Spit the Dog (1985–1995); Gordon Burns (1986–1991); Tessa Sanderson (1990–1992); Kian Egan (2012); Dave Berry (2012–2015); Marvin Humes (2013–2015); Mark Wright (2013–2015); Michael Underwood (2014–2015); Peter Andre (2014–2015); Matt Johnson (2015)
- Narrated by: Robin Houston (1984–2001)
- Country of origin: United Kingdom
- Original language: English
- No. of series: 14 (Original); 4 (Revival)
- No. of episodes: 128 (Original: inc. 9 specials); 23 (Revival: inc. 3 specials)

Production
- Production location: The London Studios
- Running time: 60 minutes (inc. adverts)
- Production companies: LWT (1984–2001); ITV Studios (2012–2015)

Original release
- Network: ITV
- Release: 6 May 1984 – 26 December 2001
- Release: 21 October 2012 – 26 December 2015

Related
- Jim'll Fix It; Keith Lemon's LemonAid; OMG! Jedward's Dream Factory

Surprise Surprise is a British light entertainment television programme that aired in two iterations on ITV. The series originally ran from 6 May 1984 to 26 December 2001 and was hosted by Cilla Black, while a revival of the show aired from 21 October 2012 to 26 July 2015 with Holly Willoughby as host.

== Format ==
Surprise Surprise was filmed in front of a studio audience. Its premise involved surprising members of the public with the fulfilment of long-held wishes, setting up tricks to fool members of the public, making prank calls to people, and reuniting guests with long-lost loved ones. Original host Cilla Black was initially assisted by Christopher Biggins, but more famously for eight series by Bob Carolgees, famous for his glove puppetry act Spit the Dog (who previously appeared in the first series with a puppet ferret), with Gordon Burns and Tessa Sanderson as roving reporters. Other featured acts were "Cilla-grams," where Black would perform a song in a musical sketch relevant to the surprise a person was receiving (for example, a soldier was celebrating his 21st birthday, so the featuring song Black sang was "Celebration" by Kool & The Gang).

The concept of the first series had been to film surprising and often unusual moments similar to those previously seen on Game for a Laugh. This included a phone game that used viewers numbers and answering questions to try and form a winning line. Others included dancing and sporting events, and there were surprise reunions between family members. The popularity of this element of the show led executive producer Alan Boyd to change the format slightly so that all items in subsequent series involved surprises, rather than just being surprising. Although including many pre-filmed inserts, the first series and some early episodes of the second series were televised live in their entirety, but thereafter all episodes were pre-recorded.

From 1984 to 1988, the show was broadcast on Sunday evenings. From 1989 to 1992, the show moved to Fridays, before returning to the Sunday evening timeslot from 1993 to 1996. The final series of the original run in 1997 was broadcast on Friday evenings. Between 1998 and 2001, a one-off special episode was produced per year which aired on Mother's Day from 1998 until 2000, and then at Christmas for 2001.

Over the years, the show had many special guests, some of whom appeared live, including Neil Diamond. Many variety acts were also featured on the show. The Spice Girls made their live debut on an episode in 1996.

=== Revival ===
In March 2012, it was announced that Holly Willoughby would host a revamped one-off episode of Surprise Surprise for ITV, although a full series was later announced. The series had six hour-long episodes, with episode 1 airing on 21 October 2012. A second series followed this in 2013, a third in 2014 and a fourth in 2015.

In the show, Willoughby is joined by various locations reporters, these have included Marvin Humes, Mark Wright, Dave Berry, Peter Andre and Matt Johnson.

In one 2013 episode, Cilla Black made a surprise appearance on the show, singing a bit of the original theme as the show went to commercials (after Willoughby made the comment that producers refused to let her sing the song).

==== Final episodes ====
The last series hosted by Holly Willoughby aired on ITV1 between 21 June and 26 July 2015. On 17 June 2016, ITV announced that the show had been cancelled and would not return for 2017. Willoughby called for the show to return for another series, but this did not happen.

A previously unbroadcast episode of the show, hosted by Cilla Black that featured appearances from Irish boyband Westlife and singer Gareth Gates, which was originally produced in 2003 as a one-off special to celebrate the series' 20th anniversary, was broadcast on ITV3 on 27 December 2015, four months after Black's death. It wasn't originally broadcast at the time due to Black's departure from ITV earlier that year.

== Theme songs ==
Cilla Black introduced and closed each show by singing a theme song. The theme song from series one to eight was written by Kate Robbins and was often imitated by Black impersonators, beginning "The more the world is changing, the more it stays the same...". Impressionist Jessica Martin performed a sketch on Bobby Davro's TV Weekly television show in which she, as Black, delivered the line "The unexpected hits you between the eyes" and was promptly struck on the forehead by an errant boom mike. The track was included on Black's 1985 album Surprisingly Cilla, and as a single through Towerbell Records. A new song was written from series nine in 1992, until the show's conclusion in 2001, and the 2003 birthday special: "Reaching out, holding hands, reliving memories... Life is full, full of surprises...And the nicest surprise in my life is you!"

The revived series updated its theme for 2013. This theme uses a remixed instrumental version of the chorus from Black's original song "Surprise, Surprise".

Around 2022–23, the song enjoyed a resurgence on the social media app TikTok. It then experienced another resurgence in 2025, when TikToker Dannie D used the song as part of his videos surrounding news of the administration of US president Donald Trump. His signature move, lifting his leg up in time to the sound of the song in response to news of President Trump’s failures, went viral and became widely recognized throughout the platform.

== Transmissions ==
=== Series ===
Original

Series	Start date	End date	Episodes
1	6 May 1984	10 June 1984	6
2	14 October 1984	2 December 1984	8
3	19 January 1986	9 March 1986	8
4	18 January 1987	15 March 1987	9
5	10 January 1988	6 March 1988	9
6	6 January 1989	3 March 1989	9
7	16 February 1990	20 April 1990	9
8	22 February 1991	26 April 1991	10
9	3 April 1992	29 May 1992	9
10	25 April 1993	4 July 1993	10
11	10 April 1994	19 June 1994	11
12	23 April 1995	2 July 1995	10
13	31 March 1996	2 June 1996	10
14	4 July 1997	5 September 1997	10

Revival

Series	Start date	End date	Episodes
1	21 October 2012	25 November 2012	6
2	15 September 2013	1 December 2013	10
3	22 October 2014	17 December 2014	7
4	21 June 2015	26 July 2015	6

=== Specials ===
Original

Original Air date	Special
23 December 1984	Christmas special
22 December 1985	Christmas special
28 December 1986	Christmas special
27 December 1987	Christmas special
24, 25, 26 March 1989	Searchline Specials
13 April 1990	Searchline Special
22 June 1997	Surprise Surprise...in Australia
22 March 1998	Mother's Day special
14 March 1999	Mother's Day special
2 April 2000	Mother's Day special
26 December 2001	Christmas special
27 December 2015	Anniversary Special (from 2003)

Revival

Airdate	Special
18 December 2013	Christmas special
30 March 2014	Mother's Day special
21 December 2014	Christmas special
26 December 2015	Christmas special

== Awards ==
Year	Group	Award	Result	References
2014	National Television Awards	Most Popular Entertainment Programme	Nominated	
2015	National Television Awards	Most Popular Entertainment Programme	Nominated	

== International versions ==
Country	Title	Broadcaster	Presenter	Premiere	Finale
Germany	Surprise! Die Bruce Darnell Show	ProSieben	Bruce Darnell	2 December 2021	23 December 2021
Italy	Carràmba! Che sorpresa (1995–98; 2002); Carràmba! Che fortuna (1998–2001; 2008–09)	Rai 1	Raffaella Carrà	21 December 1995	6 January 2009
Netherlands	Surpriseshow (1988–2008); Surprise, Surprise (2014–15)	Nederland 1 (1988–89); RTL 4 (1990–2001; 2008); Talpa (2006); SBS6 (2014–15)	Henny Huisman (1988–2001; 2006); Robert ten Brink (2008); Henny Huisman, Do and Airen Mylene (2014–15)	1988; 2006; 2008; 2014	2001; 2006; 2008; 2015
Poland	Surprise, Surprise	Polsat	Wojciech Błach and Stefano Terrazzino	12 March 2016 (Note: The show debuted on 12 March but due to low viewing figures it was axed after just one episode. The remaining seven episodes returned on air on 21 July.)	2 September 2016 (Note: The last episode of the series aired at around 1:30 AM.)
Romania	Surprize, Surprize	TVR 1	Andreea Marin and Gabriel Coveșanu	1999	2008
Spain	Sorpresa ¡Sorpresa!	Antena 3	Isabel Gemio (1996–98; 2007); Concha Velasco (1999)	8 May 1996	January 2007
Ukraine	Сюрприз, Сюрприз!	STB	Masha Efrosinina	1 September 2017	1 December 2017
United States	Surprise, Surprise, Surprise	CBS	Kathie Lee Gifford	14 May 1999 (Special)	
United States	Surprise with Jenny McCarthy	NBC	Jenny McCarthy	Non-broadcast pilot	
